= Gò Công Tây =

- Ward
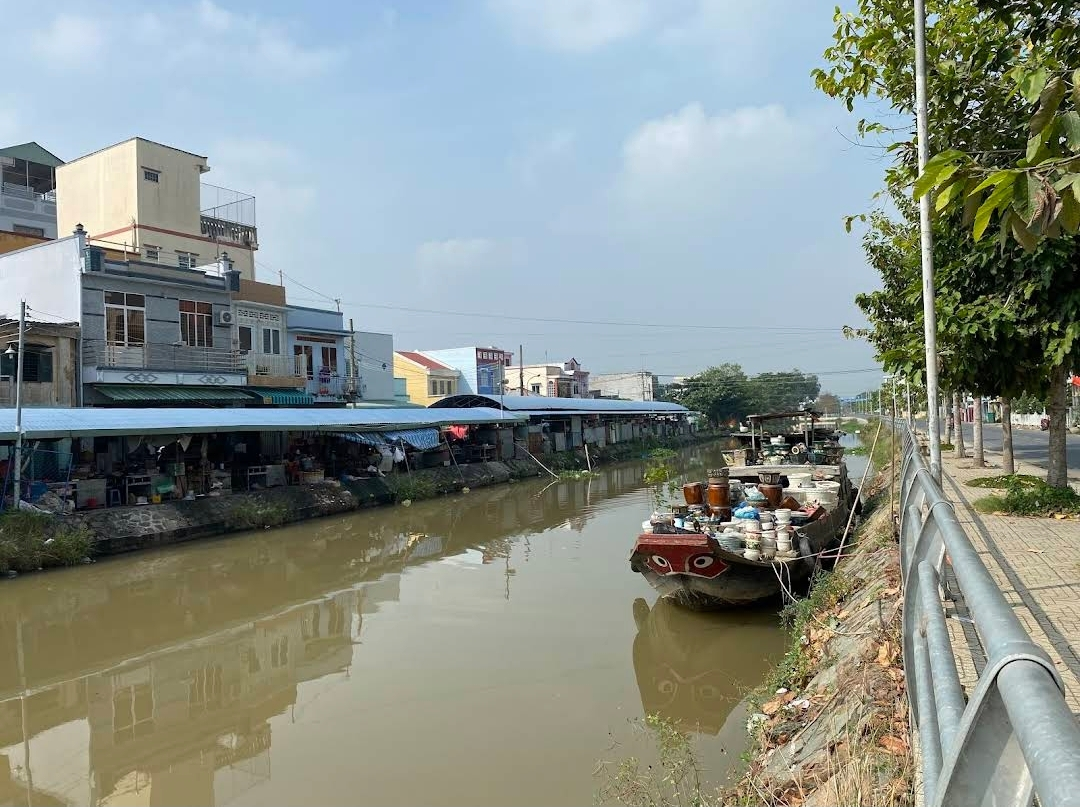
- The central area of Gò Công Tây ward
- Interactive map of Gò Công Tây
- Coordinates: 10°20′43″N 106°34′31″E
- Country: Vietnam
- Province: Đồng Tháp
- Establish: June 16, 2025
- Become a ward: May 11, 2026

Area
  - Total: 40 km^{2} (15 sq mi)

Population (2024)
  - Total: 44,540 people
  - Density: 1,100/km^{2} (2,900/sq mi)

Gò Công Tây is a ward in Đồng Tháp province, Vietnam. It is one of 102 communes and wards in the province.

== Geography ==
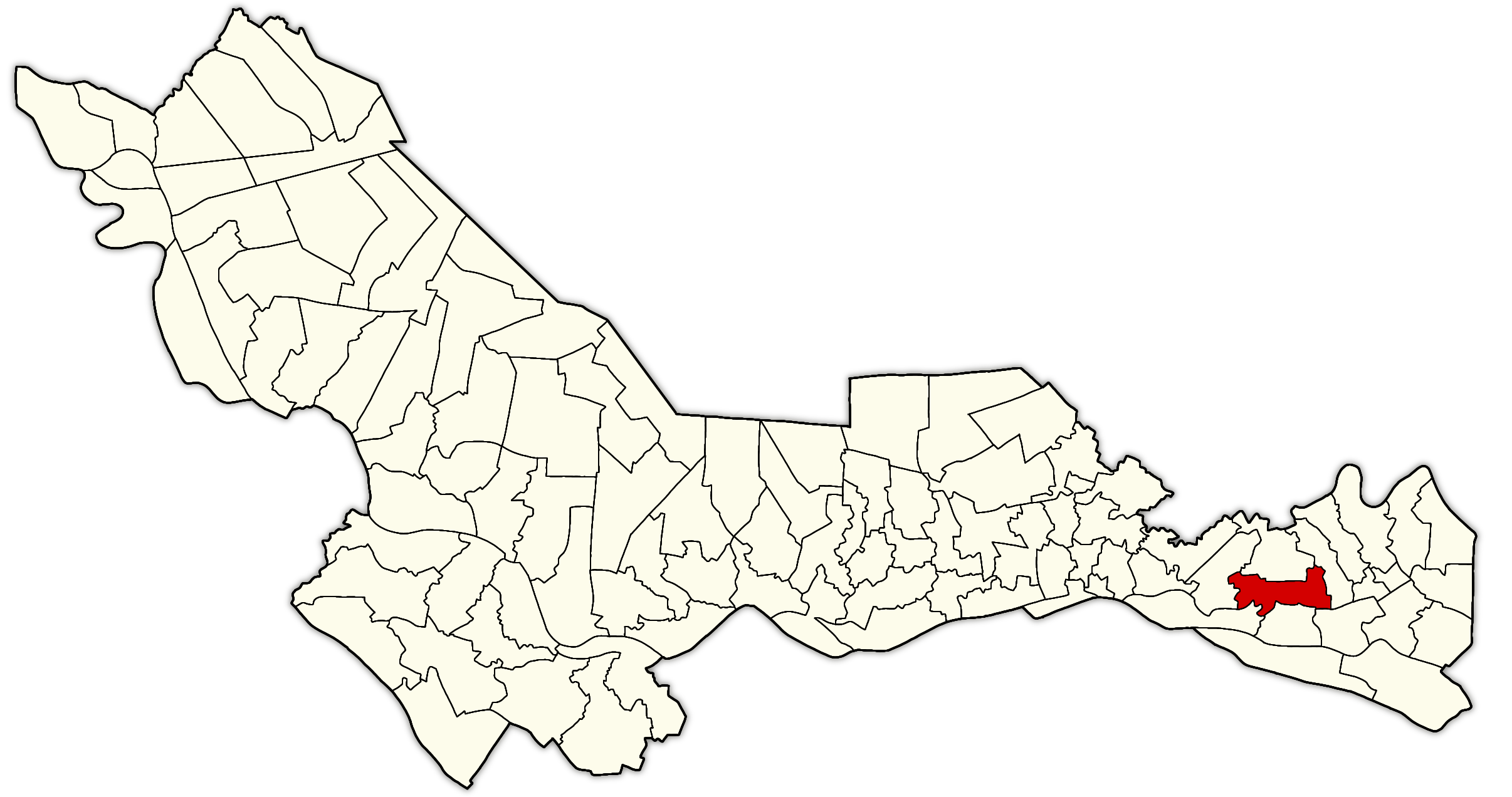
Location of Gò Công Tây on Đồng Tháp province map (highlight in red).

Gò Công Tây ward is located in the eastern part of Đồng Tháp province, approximately 125 km from Cao Lãnh ward and about 30 km east of Mỹ Tho ward and 15 km west of Gò Công ward.

- To the east, it borders Phú Thành commune.
- To the west, it borders An Thạnh Thủy commune.
- To the south, it borders Bình Ninh commune, Vĩnh Hựu commune, and Long Bình commune.
- To the north, it borders Đồng Sơn commune.

== History ==
Before 1975, the area of the present-day ward was part of Gò Công province belonging to the Saigon government.

On February 24, 1976, the Provisional Revolutionary Government of the Republic of South Vietnam issued a decree No. 3/NQ/1976 on the dissolution of zone and the merger of provinces in Southern Vietnam. Accordingly: Tiền Giang province was established by merging the entire area and population of Định Tường province, Gò Công province, and Mỹ Tho city.

At that time, current area Vĩnh Bình commune was formerly Vĩnh Bình town and the communes of Thạnh Nhựt and Thạnh Trị in Gò Công district. Vĩnh Bình town was then the district capital of Gò Công district.

On March 26, 1977, the Government Council issued Decision No. 77-CP on the conversion of Go Cong town in Tien Giang province into Go Cong township in Go Cong district of the same province. Accordingly:

- Gò Công district-level town is transformed into Gò Công town under Gò Công district, Tiền Giang province.

On April 13, 1979, the Government Council issued Decision No. 155-CP on dividing Gò Công district in Tiền Giang province into Gò Công Đông district and Gò Công Tây district. Accordingly:

- Gò Công Đông district comprises Gò Công town (district capital) and 16 communes: Bình Ân, Bình Đông, Bình Nghị, Bình Xuân, Gia Thuận, Kiểng Phước, Phú Đông, Phước Trung, Tăng Hòa, Tân Điền, Tân Đông, Tân Phước, Tân Tây, Tân Thành, Tân Trung và Vàm Láng.
- Gò Công Tây district comprises Vĩnh Bình town (district capital) and 15 communes: Bình Nhì, Bình Phú, Bình Tân, Đồng Sơn, Đồng Thạnh, Long Bình, Long Vĩnh, Phú Thạnh, Tân Phú, Tân Thới, Thành Công, Thạnh Nhựt, Thạnh Trị, Vĩnh Hựu, Yên Luông.

From then on, Vĩnh Bình town and Thạnh Nhựt and Thạnh Trị communes belonged to Gò Công Tây district. At the same time, Vĩnh Bình town became the district capital of Gò Công Tây district.

On June 12, 2025, the 15th National Assembly of Vietnam issued Resolution No. 202/2025/QH15 on the rearrangement of provincial-level administrative units. Accordingly:

- The new Đồng Tháp province was established by merging the entire area and population of Đồng Tháp province and Tiền Giang province.

On June 16, 2025, the Standing Committee of the National Assembly of Vietnam issued Resolution No. 1663/NQ-UBTVQH15 on the rearrangement of commune-level administrative units in Dong Thap province in 2025. Accordingly:

- The commune of Vĩnh Bình was established by merging the entire area and population of Vĩnh Bình town, Thạnh Trị commune, and Thạnh Nhựt commune (Excerpt from Clause 71, Article 1)

On May 11, 2026, the People's Council of Đồng Tháp province approved the plan to establish 11 new wards in the province. Accordingly:

- The Gò Công Tây ward was established based on the entire area and population of Vĩnh Bình commune.
