= National Route 50 (Vietnam) =

National Route 50
- Quốc lộ 50
- Văn Tiến Dũng Road (in Bình Hưng and Hưng Long); Hồ Biểu Chánh Road (in Gò Công, Đồng Tháp)
- National Route 50 in Mỹ Tho area

Route information
- Length: 88.8 km (55.2 mi)

Major junctions
- North end: Nhị Thiên Đường Bridge in Bình Đông, Ho Chi Minh City
- Nguyễn Văn Linh Parkway at Bình Hưng, Ho Chi Minh City; at Đa Phước interchange, Hưng Long, Ho Chi Minh City; at Cần Giuộc, Tây Ninh province; at Mỹ Lộc, Tây Ninh province
- Southwest end: in Trung An, Đồng Tháp province

Location
- Country: Vietnam
- Provinces: Tây Ninh, Đồng Tháp
- Major cities: Ho Chi Minh City

Highway system
- Transport in Vietnam
← QL 49F	→ QL 50B

National Route 50 (Vietnamese: Quốc lộ 50) is a national route linking Ho Chi Minh City with provinces of Tây Ninh and Đồng Tháp. This is also a major national highway in the Southern Vietnam, connecting the Southeast region with the Mekong Delta.

== Route ==
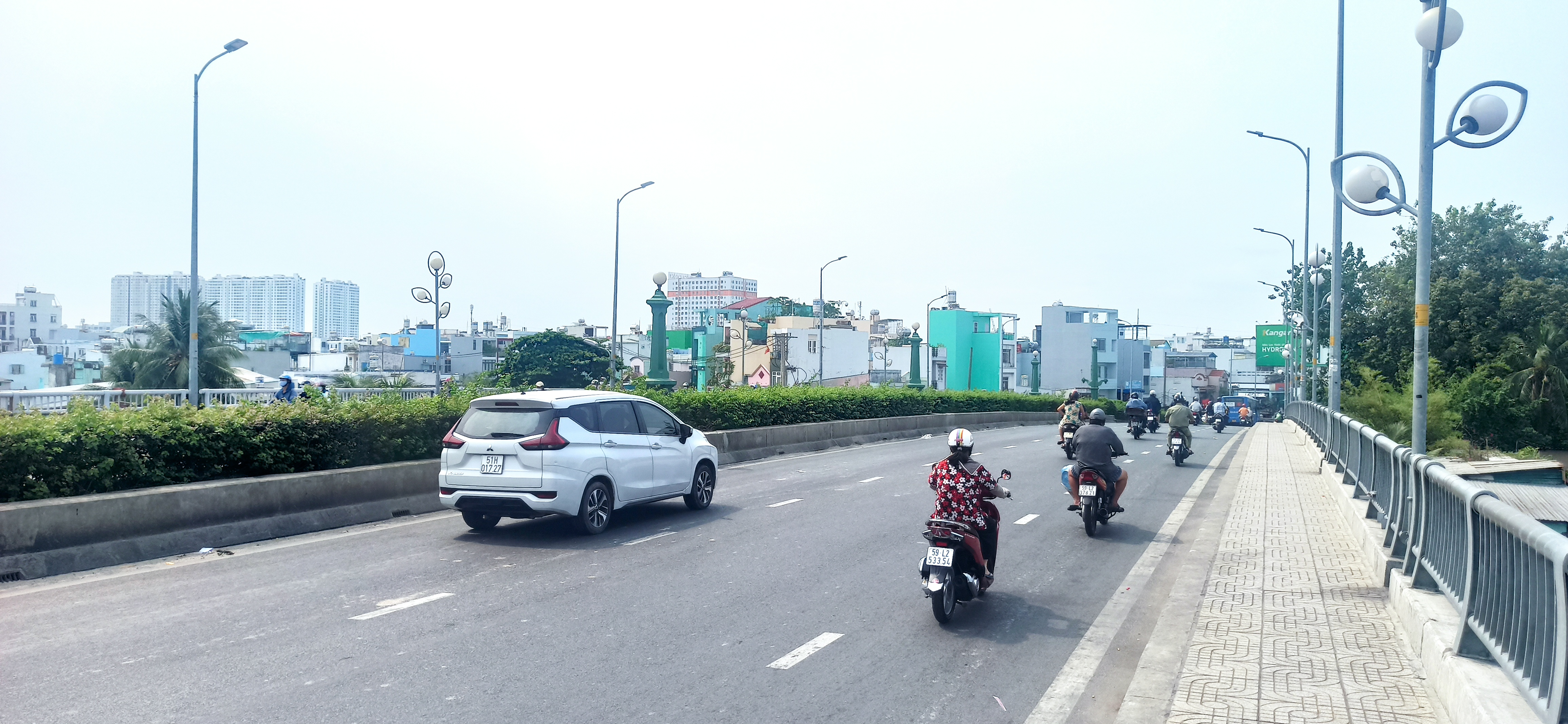
Nhị Thiên Đường Bridge, Bình Đông, the route north end

The route starts from the north at Nhị Thiên Đường Bridge in Bình Đông, Ho Chi Minh City, heading south across the communes of Bình Hưng, Hưng Long (Ho Chi Minh City). Diverges into Tây Ninh province, across the communes of Cần Giuộc, Mỹ Lộc, Mỹ Lệ, Tân Lân and Cần Đước.

Then, the route crosses Vàm Cỏ River by Mỹ Lợi Bridge (borders of Tây Ninh and Đồng Tháp) and goes into Đồng Tháp province, across wards of Sơn Qui and Gò Công.

At Gò Công, the route turn left and crosses Bình Xuân, Phú Thành, Vĩnh Bình, Đồng Sơn, An Thạnh Thủy, Chợ Gạo, Tân Thuận Bình and Mỹ Phong. Then the route follows the Mỹ Tho bypass through the ward of Đạo Thạnh and ends at intersection with National Route 1 at Trung An, Đồng Tháp.

=== Frontage road ===
The construction of the National Route 50 expansion and its frontage road in Bình Hưng and Hưng Long (former Bình Chánh district), Ho Chi Minh City, marks a crucial milestone in improving the city's southern gateway infrastructure. Initiated in December 2022, this comprehensive 7-kilometer project features a newly built 4.36-kilometer frontage road designed with six lanes and a width of 34 meters. Backed by a total investment of nearly 1.5 trillion VND, the entire route is steadily progressing toward its final completion and is officially scheduled to open to traffic in December 2026, which will effectively eliminate chronic traffic congestion and boost regional connectivity between Ho Chi Minh City and former Long An province.

The frontage road starts from Nguyễn Văn Linh Parkway and ends at junction that under 3 kilometers away to the north of Đa Phước interchange with Ben Luc – Long Thanh Expressway.

== Information ==
National Route 50 intersection with Nguyễn Văn Linh Parkway

Previously, the section between Ho Chi Minh City and former Long An province was also known as Interprovincial Road 50 (Liên tỉnh lộ 50).

Lengths of some sections on National Route 50:

- Ho Chi Minh City section: 12 km.
- Ho Chi Minh City - Gò Công: 40,9 km.
- Gò Công - Mỹ Tho: 41,3 km.

National Route 50, along with National Route 60, forms a coastal route running parallel to National Route 1, passing through the provinces of the Mekong Delta.

The route in Gò Công area is named as Hồ Biểu Chánh Road, after the Vietnamese writer who was born in this area, Hồ Biểu Chánh.

From 2025, Ho Chi Minh City's government changed the section from Nguyễn Văn Linh Parkway to the borderline with Tây Ninh Province of the route as Văn Tiến Dũng Road, named after the Vietnamese general Văn Tiến Dũng.
