= Phú Thành =

- Commune
- Country: Vietnam
- Province: Đồng Tháp
- Establish: June 16, 2025

Area
  - Total: 31.92 km^{2} (12.32 sq mi)

Population (2025)
  - Total: 25,135 people
  - Density: 787.4/km^{2} (2,039/sq mi)
- Time zone: UTC+07:00

Phú Thành is a commune in Đồng Tháp province, Vietnam. It is one of 102 communes and wards in the province following the 2025 reorganization.

== Geography ==
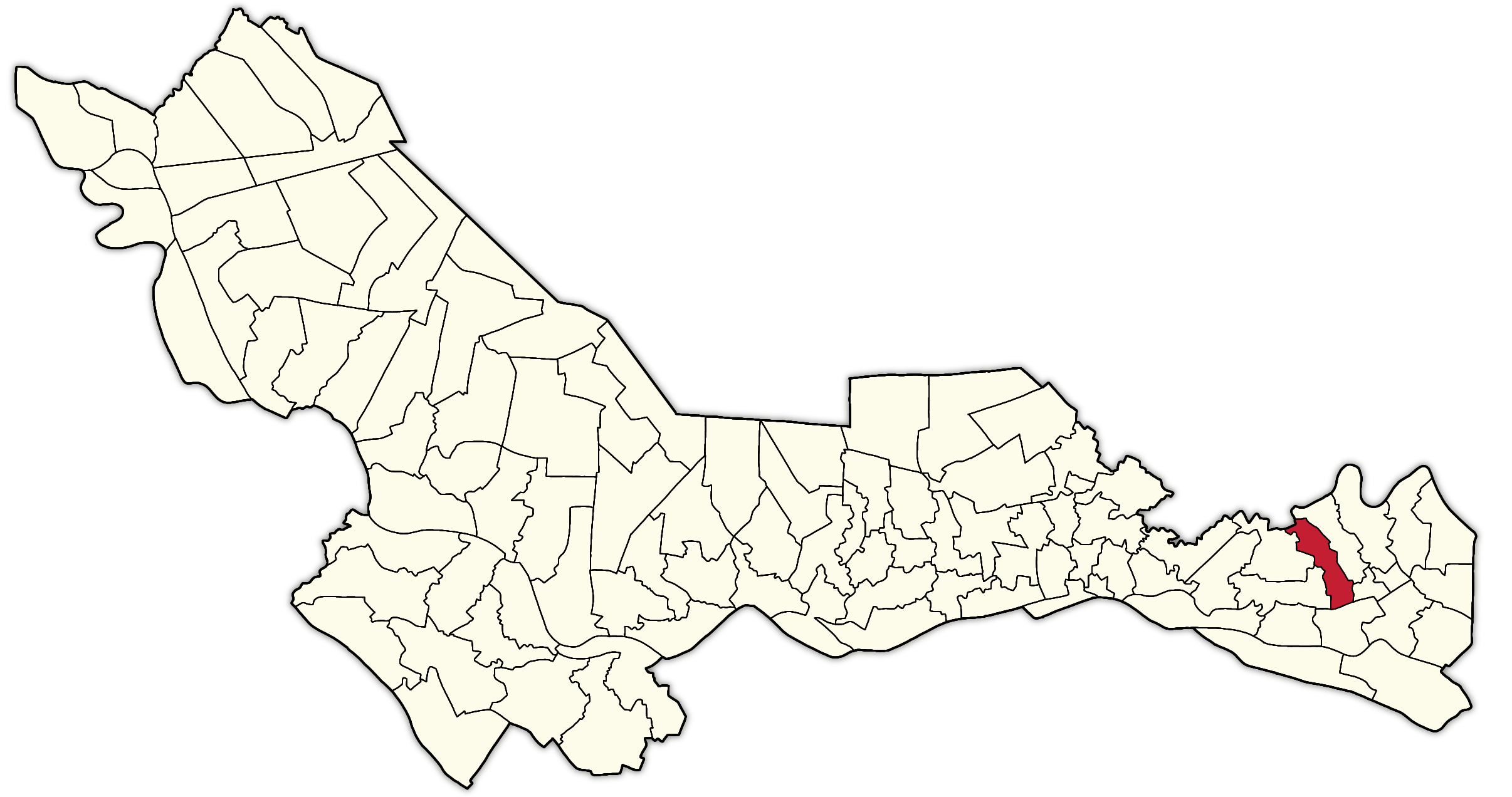
Location of Phú Thành commune on Đồng Tháp province map (highlight in red).

Phú Thành is a commune located in the eastern part of Đồng Tháp province, approximately 135 km from Cao Lãnh ward, about 40 km east of Mỹ Tho ward. The commune has the following geographical location:

- To the east, it borders Gò Công ward and Bình Xuân ward.
- To the west, it borders Đồng Sơn commune and Vĩnh Bình commune.
- To the south, it borders Long Bình commune.

== History ==
Prior to 2025, Phú Thành commune was formerly Bình Phú, Thành Công, and Yên Luông communes belonging to Gò Công Tây district, Tiền Giang province.

On June 12, 2025, the National Assembly of Vietnam issued Resolution No. 202/2025/QH15 on the reorganization of provincial-level administrative units. Accordingly:

- Đồng Tháp province was established by merging the entire area and population of Đồng Tháp province and Tiền Giang province.

On June 16, 2025, the Standing Committee of the National Assembly of Vietnam issued Resolution No. 1663/NQ-UBTVQH15 on the reorganization of commune-level administrative units in Đồng Tháp province. Accordingly:

- Phú Thành commune was established by merging the entire area and population of Bình Phú, Thành Công, and Yên Luông communes (formerly part of Gò Công Tây district).
