= Bình Ninh =

Commune in Đồng Tháp province, Vietnam

- Commune
- Location of Bình Ninh commune
- Interactive map of Bình Ninh
- Country: Vietnam
- Region: Mekong Delta
- Province: Đồng Tháp
- Established: June 16, 2025

Government
  - Type: Commune
  - Body: Bình Ninh Party Committee

Area
  - Total: 46.64 km^{2} (18.01 sq mi)

Population (2025)
  - Total: 36,131 people
  - Density: 774.7/km^{2} (2,006/sq mi)
- Time zone: UTC+07:00

Bình Ninh is a commune in Đồng Tháp province, Vietnam. It is one of 102 communes and wards in the province.

== Geography ==
Location of Bình Ninh commune on Đồng Tháp province map (highlight in red).

Bình Ninh is a riverside commune on the Tiền river located in the eastern part of Đồng Tháp province, 20 km west of Gò Công ward and 5 km east of Mỹ Tho ward. It borders with Mỹ Phong, Gò Công Tây wards and Chợ Gạo, An Thạnh Thủy communes to the north, Vĩnh Hựu commune to the east, Tân Thới commune and Vĩnh Long province to the south.

== Administrative divisions ==
Binh Ninh commune is divided into 15 hamlets: An Cư, Bình Hưng Thượng, Bình Ninh, Bình Phú, Hòa Định, Hòa Lạc, Hòa Lạc Trung, Hòa Mỹ, Hòa Thạnh, Mỹ Thạnh, Tân Hòa, Tân Ninh, Tân Thạnh, Tân Thuận and Xuân Đông.

== History ==
Prior to 2025, the area that is now Bình Ninh commune was formerly Xuân Đông, Hòa Định, and Bình Ninh communes in Chợ Gạo district, Đồng Tháp province.

Prior to 2025, the National Assembly of Vietnam issued Resolution No. 202/2025/QH15 on the reorganization of provincial-level administrative units. Đồng Tháp province was established by merging the entire area and population of Đồng Tháp province and Tiền Giang province.

On June 16, 2025, the Standing Committee of the National Assembly of Vietnam issued Resolution No. 1663/NQ-UBTVQH15 on the reorganization of commune-level administrative units in Đồng Tháp province. Bình Ninh commune was established by merging the entire area and population of Xuân Đông, Hòa Định, and Bình Ninh communes (formerly part of Chợ Gạo district).
