= Gò Công (disambiguation) =

Gò Công may refer to the following places in Vietnam:

- Gò Công ward, Đồng Tháp province
- Gò Công Tây ward, Đồng Tháp province
- Gò Công Đông commune, Đồng Tháp province

== Former places ==
- Former Gò Công provincial city of Tiền Giang province
- Gò Công district, old district of Tiền Giang province, was split into Gò Công Đông and Gò Công Tây
- Gò Công Đông district of Tiền Giang province.
- Former Gò Công province
- Former Gò Công Tây district of Tiền Giang province.
- Gò Công: former commune-level town, capital of Gò Công district.
