= Lương Hòa Lạc =

Commune in Đồng Tháp province, Vietnam

- Commune
- Location of Lương Hòa Lạc commune
- Interactive map of Lương Hòa Lạc
- Country: Vietnam
- Region: Mekong Delta
- Province: Đồng Tháp
- Established: June 16, 2025

Government
  - Type: Commune
  - Body: Lương Hòa Lạc; Party Committee

Area
  - Total: 35.28 km^{2} (13.62 sq mi)

Population (2025)
  - Total: 37,661 people
  - Density: 1,067/km^{2} (2,765/sq mi)
- Time zone: UTC+07:00

Lương Hòa Lạc is a commune in Đồng Tháp province, Vietnam. It is one of 102 communes and wards in the province.

== Geography ==
Location of Lương Hòa Lạc commune in Đồng Tháp province map (highlight in red).

Lương Hòa Lạc is a commune located in the eastern part of Đồng Tháp province, 10 km north of Mỹ Tho ward, 30 km west of Gò Công ward, and 100 km east of Cao Lãnh ward. It borders with Đạo Thạnh, Mỹ Phong wards and Chợ Gạo commune to the south, Tân Thuận Bình commune and Tây Ninh province to the east, Mỹ Tịnh An commune to the north and Châu Thành ward to the west.

== Administrative divisions ==
Lương Hòa Lạc commune is divided into 13 hamlets: An Lạc, Bình Long, Đăng Phong, Lương Phú A, Lương Phú B, Lương Phú C, Phú Khương, Phú Lợi, Phú Lợi C, Phú Thạnh, Phú Thạnh A, Thanh Đăng B, Trường Xuân.

== History ==
Prior to 2025, the area that is now Lương Hòa Lạc commune was formerly Thanh Bình, Phú Kiết and Lương Hòa Lạc communes in Chợ Gạo district, Tiền Giang province.

On June 12, 2025, the National Assembly of Vietnam issued Resolution No. 202/2025/QH15 on the reorganization of provincial-level administrative units. Đồng Tháp province was established by merging the entire area and population of Đồng Tháp and Tiền Giang provinces.

On June 12, 2025, the Standing Committee of the National Assembly of Vietnam issued Resolution No. 1663/NQ-UBTVQH15 on the reorganization of commune-level administrative units. Lương Hòa Lạc commune was established by merging the entire area and population of Thanh Bình, Phú Kiết and Lương Hòa Lạc communes (formerly part of Chợ Gạo district).
