= Mỹ Tịnh An =

Commune in Đồng Tháp province, Vietnam

- Commune
- Location of Mỹ Tịnh An commune
- Interactive map of Mỹ Tịnh An
- Country: Vietnam
- Region: Mekong Delta
- Province: Đồng Tháp
- Established: June 16, 2025

Government
  - Type: Commune
  - Body: Mỹ Tịnh An; Party Committee

Area
  - Total: 41.21 km^{2} (15.91 sq mi)

Population (2025)
  - Total: 36,958 people
  - Density: 896.8/km^{2} (2,323/sq mi)
- Time zone: UTC+07:00

Mỹ Tịnh An is a commune in Đồng Tháp province, Vietnam. It is one of 102 communes and wards in the province.

== Geography ==
Location of Mỹ Tịnh An in Đồng Tháp province map (highlight in red).

Mỹ Tịnh An is a commune located in the eastern part of Đồng Tháp province, 15km north of Mỹ Tho ward and 30km northwest of Gò Công ward. It borders with Tây Ninh province to the north and east, Lương Hòa Lạc commune to the south, Châu Thành ward and Tân Hương commune to the west.

== Administrative divisions ==
Mỹ Tịnh An divided into 13 hamlets: An Thị, Bình Cách, Hòa Bình, Hòa Quới, Mỹ An A, Mỹ An B, Mỹ Thọ, Mỹ Trường, Nhựt Tân, Phú Hòa, Song Thạnh, Trung Hòa, Trung Thạnh.

== History ==
Prior to 2025, the area that is now Mỹ Tịnh An commune was formerly Trung Hòa, Hòa Tịnh, Tân Bình Thành and Mỹ Tịnh An communes in Chợ Gạo district, Vietnam.

On June 12, 2025, the National Assembly of Vietnam issued Resolution No. 202/2025/QH15 on the reorganization of provincial-level administrative units. Đồng Tháp province was established by merging the entire area and population of Đồng Tháp and Tiền Giang provinces.

On June 12, 2025, the Standing Committee of the National Assembly of Vietnam issued Resolution No. 1663/NQ-UBTVQH15 on the reorganization of commune-level administrative units in Đồng Tháp province. Mỹ Tịnh An commune was established by merging the entire area and population of Trung Hòa, Hòa Tịnh, Tân Bình Thạnh and Mỹ Tịnh An communes (formerly part of Chợ Gạo district).
