= Tân Thuận Bình =

Commune in Đồng Tháp province, Vietnam

- Commune
- Provincial route 29
- Interactive map of Tân Thuận Bình
- Country: Vietnam
- Region: Mekong Delta
- Province: Đồng Tháp
- Established: 16 June 2025

Government
  - Type: Commune
  - Body: Tân Thuận Bình; Party Committee

Area
  - Total: 39.94 km^{2} (15.42 sq mi)

Population (2025)
  - Total: 40,031 people
  - Density: 1,002/km^{2} (2,596/sq mi)
- Time zone: UTC+07:00

Tân Thuận Bình is a commune in Đồng Tháp province, Vietnam. It is one of 102 communes and wards in the province.

== Geography ==
Location of Tân Thuận Bình commune on Đồng Tháp province map (highlight in red).

Tân Thuận Bình is a commune located in the eastern part of Đồng Tháp province, 10 km northeast of Mỹ Tho ward and 22 km west of Gò Công ward. It borders with Tây Ninh province to the north, Chợ Gạo commune to the southwest, An Thạnh Thủy commune to the southeast, Lương Hòa Lạc commune to the west and Đồng Sơn commune to the east.

== History ==
Prior to 2025, the area that is now Tân Thuận Bình commune was formerly Đăng Hưng Phước, Quơn Long, and Tân Thuận Bình communes in Chợ Gạo district, Tiền Giang province.

On June 12, 2025, the National Assembly of Vietnam issued Resolution No. 202/2025/QH15 on the reorganization of the provincial-level administrative units. Đồng Tháp province was established by merging the entire area and population of Đồng Tháp province and Tiền Giang province.

On June 16, 2025, the Standing Committee of the National Assembly of Vietnam issued Resolution No. 1663/NQ-UBTVQH15 on the reorganization of the commune-level administrative units in Đồng Tháp province. Tân Thuận Bình commune was established by merging the entire area and population of Đăng Hưng Phước, Quơn Long and Tân Thuận Bình communes (formerly part of Chợ Gạo district).
