= An Thạnh Thủy =

Commune in Đồng Tháp province, Vietnam

- Commune
- Location of An Thạnh Thủy commune
- Interactive map of An Thạnh Thủy
- Coordinates: 10°22′00″N 106°30′25″E
- Country: Vietnam
- Region: Mekong Delta
- Province: Đồng Tháp
- Established: June 16, 2025

Area
  - Total: 42.67 km^{2} (16.47 sq mi)

Population (2025)
  - Total: 41,198 people
  - Density: 965.5/km^{2} (2,501/sq mi)
- Time zone: UTC+07:00

An Thạnh Thủy is a commune in Đồng Tháp province, Vietnam. It is one of 102 communes and wards in the province.

== Geography ==
Location of An Thạnh Thủy commune in Đồng Tháp province map (highlight in red).

An Thạnh Thủy is a commune located in the eastern part of Đồng Tháp province, 15 km east of Mỹ Tho ward and 20 km west of Gò Công ward. It borders with Bình Ninh commune to the south, Gò Công Tây ward to the southeast, Đồng Sơn commune to the north — northeast and Tân Thuận Bình commune to the northwest.

== Administrative divisions ==
An Thạnh Thủy commune divided into 14 hamlets: An Khương, An Phú, An Quới, Bình Hưng, Bình Khương, Bình Phan, Bình Phú, Bình Phục Nhứt, Bình Quới, Bình Thọ, Bình Thọ Trung, Bình Thủy, Thạnh An, Thạnh Hòa.

== History ==
Prior to 2025, the area that is now An Thạnh Thủy commune was formerly Bình Phan, Bình Phục Nhứt and An Thạnh Thủy communes in Chợ Gạo district of Tiền Giang province.

On June 12, 2025, the National Assembly of Vietnam issued Resolution No. 202/2025/QH15 on the reorganization of provincial-level administrative units. Đồng Tháp province was established by merging the entire area and population of Đồng Tháp and Tiền Giang provinces.

On June 12, 2025, the Standing Committee of the National Assembly of Vietnam issued Resolution No. 202/2025/QH15 on the reorganization of provincial-level administrative units. An Thạnh Thủy commune was established by merging the entire area and population of Bình Phan, Bình Phục Nhứt and An Thạnh Thủy communes (formerly part of Chợ Gạo district).
