= Chợ Gạo =

- Commune
- Chợ Gạo bridge

- Location in Vietnam
- Coordinates: 10°20′58″N 106°27′50″E
- Country: Vietnam
- Province: Đồng Tháp

Area
  - Total: 25.2 km^{2} (9.7 sq mi)

Population (2024)
  - Total: 33,793
  - Density: 1,340/km^{2} (3,500/sq mi)
- Time zone: UTC+7 (Indochina Time)

Chợ Gạo is a commune in Đồng Tháp province, Vietnam. Established in 2025 through administrative reforms, it serves as a key agricultural hub in the Mekong Delta region, renowned for its historical rice trade and modern fruit production.

Chợ Gạo encompasses an area of 25.2 square kilometers with a population of 33,793 as of 2024, yielding a density of 1,340 inhabitants per square kilometer.

== History ==
The name "Chợ Gạo" derives from a prominent rice market established in the late 18th century during the Cảnh Hưng era. According to historical records, the market originated in Bình Phan village, where the region's first rice mill was built by a Chinese family near the Bình Phan Bridge. This facilitated rice processing and trade via waterways to the Saigon River.

Administratively, the area was part of Tiền Giang province until the 2025 merger with Đồng Tháp province, forming the current Đồng Tháp province. The commune was formally created on June 16, 2025, merging Chợ Gạo township with Long Bình Điền and Song Bình communes.

Archaeological significance is evident in sites like Gò Thành, a national historical-cultural relic associated with the Óc Eo culture, featuring ancient brick structures. Another notable site is Gò Tân Tiếp, housing a large ancient brick edifice from the Funan period.

== Geography ==
Location of Chợ Gạo commune on Đồng Tháp province map (highlight in red).

Situated in the eastern part of Đồng Tháp Province, it borders with An Thạnh Thủy commune to the east; Tân Thuận Bình and Lương Hòa Lạc commune to the north; Mỹ Phong ward to the west and Bình Ninh commune to the south. It lies approximately 110 km from Cao Lãnh, 15 km east of Mỹ Tho, and 25 km west of Gò Công ward.

The Chợ Gạo Canal, a vital 28.5 km waterway, traverses the commune, connecting the Tiền River to the Vàm Cỏ Tây River. Recent upgrades, completed in 2023 with investments exceeding 1,300 billion VND, have enhanced navigation and reduced erosion.

== Economy ==
Chợ Gạo's economy is predominantly agricultural, with rice historically central due to its namesake market. Today, it is a major producer of dragon fruit (thanh long), boasting over 5,000 hectares yielding 95,000 tons annually, much of which is exported to Europe. Coconut cultivation also thrives, with recent prices ranging from 80,000 to 110,000 VND per dozen.

Tourism is emerging, highlighted by Suối Gạo Farm Glamping, offering eco-tourism experiences. Pest management initiatives, such as releasing 2,000 earwigs into coconut groves, support sustainable farming.
