= Vĩnh Tràng Temple =

Buddhist temple in Vietnam

- Chùa Vĩnh Tràng
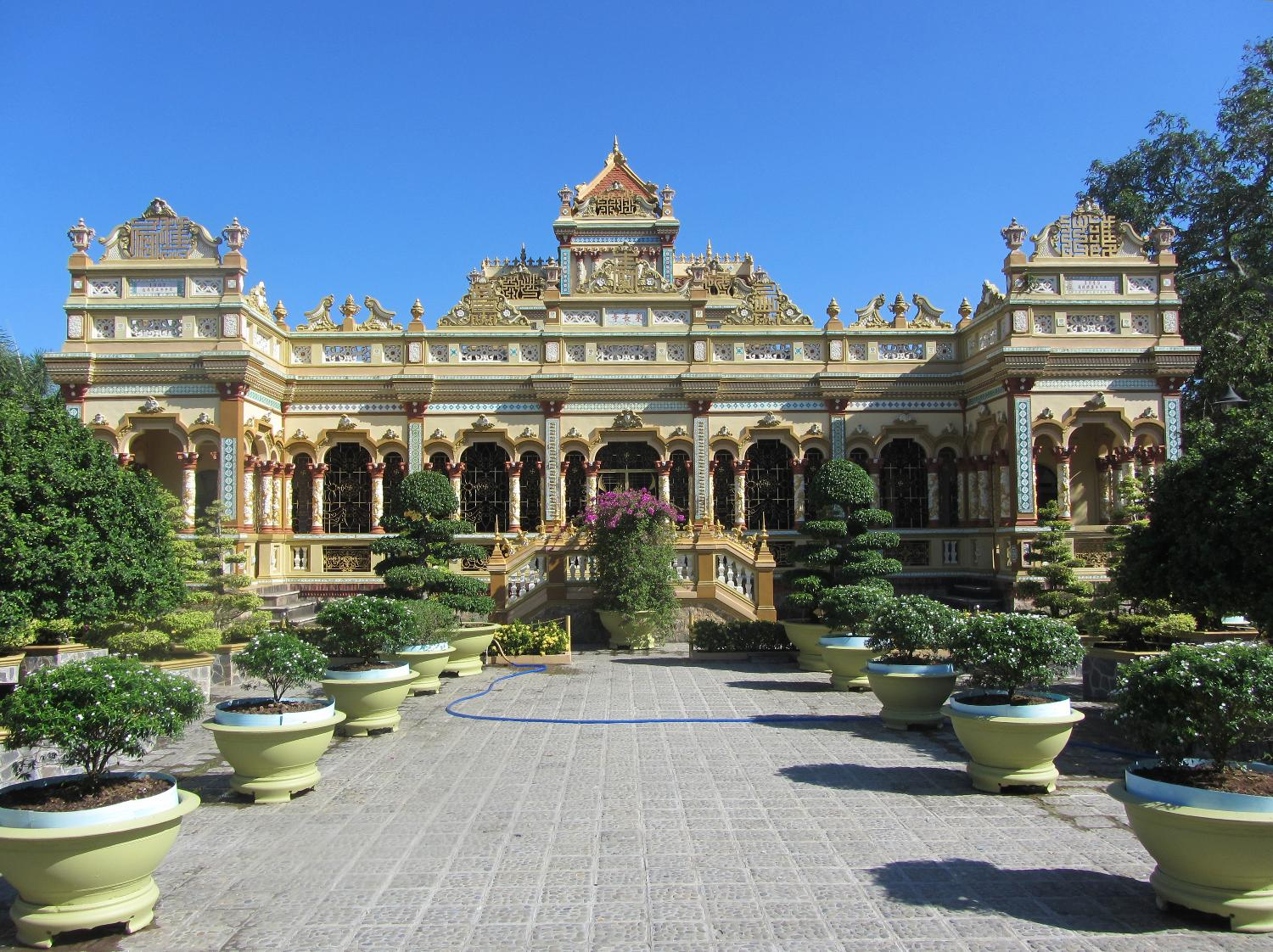
- Vĩnh Tràng Temple

Religion
- Affiliation: Buddhism
- Sect: Mahayana
- Year consecrated: 1849

Location
- Location: Nguyễn Trung Trực Street, Mỹ An, Mỹ Phong, Đồng Tháp province
- Country: Vietnam
- Interactive map of Vĩnh Tràng Temple
- Coordinates: 10°21′43.9″N 106°22′24.8″E

Architecture
- Founder: Huệ Đăng Oshō
- Completed: 1850

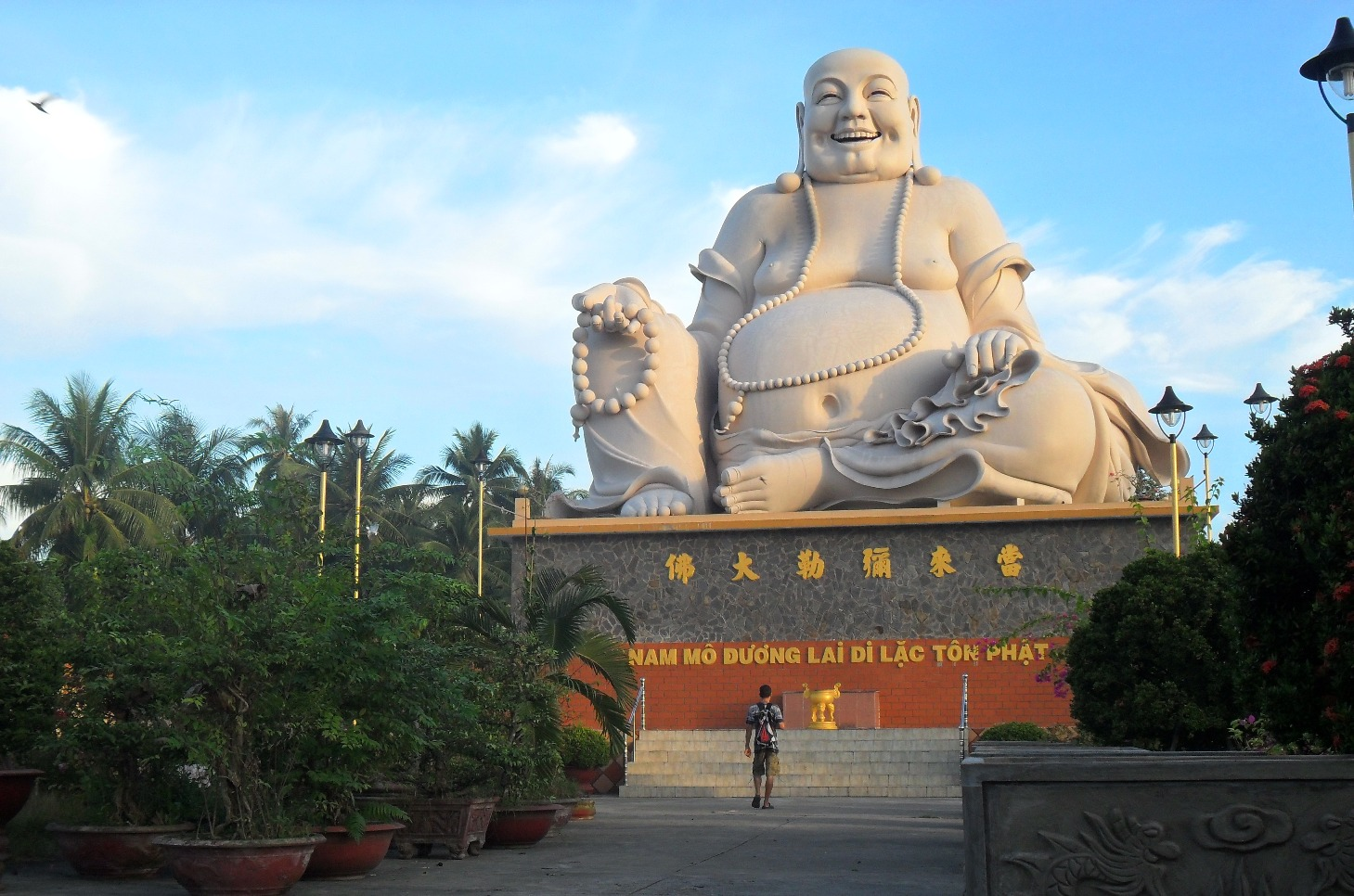
Statue of Budai (Bố Đại)

Vĩnh Tràng Temple is a Buddhist temple near Mỹ Tho, Đồng Tháp in the Mekong Delta region of Southern Vietnam. It is one of the best-known temples in the region.

The temple stands on a 2-hectare (4.9-acre) block filled with fruit trees in the village of Mỹ Hóa (now is quarter of Mỹ An) in the ward of Mỹ Phong, on Nguyễn Trung Trực Street (or Provincial Road 828) near the banks of the Gò Cát and Bảo Định canal.

== History ==
In the middle of the 19th century, the temple came into being through the endeavours of the district chief Bùi Công Đạt, who organised its erection. He recruited the monk Thích Từ Lâm from Bửu Lâm Temple to preside over Vĩnh Tràng. Following the death of Bùi Công Đạt, Thích Huệ Đăng (who was later an Oshō) presided over the remainder of the construction phase and the temple was completed in 1850.

Between 1859 and 1862, French colonial forces battled the army of the Nguyễn dynasty of Emperor Tự Đức. The French army prevailed and Tự Đức ceded three southern provinces to become the colony of Cochinchina. In the fighting, Vĩnh Tràng was seriously damaged. The successor of Thích Huệ Đăng was Thích Thiện Đề, and he oversaw the reconstruction efforts. After his death, the temple fell into disuse.

In 1890, Thích Trà Chánh was recruited from Sắc tứ Linh Thứu Temple to become the abbot of the temple. The new abbot hailed from Mỹ Tho and was a disciple of Thích Minh Phước. In 1895, Thích Chánh Hậu organised a complete renovation of the temple. In 1904, the temple was ravaged in a large tropical storm, requiring a major rebuilding in 1907. Thích Chánh Hậu presided as the abbot for 33 years until his death in 1923. His successor Thích Minh Đàn, organised further renovations including the main triple gate, main ceremonial hall and the patriarch hall.

== Architecture ==
The main Tam quan gateway was built in 1933 through the labour of craftsmen recruited from the imperial capital in Huế, central Vietnam. The central gate is made from steel, while the two side gates are made from concrete and styled akin to a historical fortress. The triple gate has an upper level with another large gate on top. On the right is the statue of Thích Chánh Hậu and on the left is a statue of Thích Minh Đàn. Both sculptures were made of statue and were made by Nguyễn Phi Hoanh. The front of the temple is designed in a style that mixes European and Asian architecture.

In the main hall of the temple, there are multiple statues of various Buddhas including Amitabha Buddha, Gautama Buddha, various arahants and bodhisattvas. There are also statues of Thích Chánh Hậu and Thích Minh Đàn. The three oldest statues in the temple are those of Amitabha, Avalokiteshvara and Đại Thế Chí bodhisattva, which are made of bronze. However, the statue of Avalokiteshvara has been lost for a long time, so a wooden replacement was made. There is also a statue of the Ngọc Hoàng, roughly the size of a real human.

The statues of 18 arahants are carved from wood and were made in 1907 by a group of southern craftsmen. Each statue is approximately 80 centimetres (31 in) tall and 58 centimetres (23 in) in width.

The garden of the temple is decorated with many pot plants and are tended to on a regular basis. Under the shade of one tree is the stupa of Thích Chánh Hậu, in which his ashes are interred.

The temple is currently the office of the board of the provincial Buddhist Association of Tiền Giang Province. It is a major provincial destination for tourists and pilgrims.
