= Tân Thới =

- Commune
- Interactive map of Tân Thới
- Country: Vietnam
- Province: Đồng Tháp
- Establish: June 16, 2025

Area
  - Total: 65.83 km^{2} (25.42 sq mi)

Population (2025)
  - Total: 32,116 people
  - Density: 487.9/km^{2} (1,264/sq mi)
- Time zone: UTC+07:00

Tân Thới is a commune in Đồng Tháp province, Vietnam. It is one of 102 communes and wards in the province following the 2025 reorganization.

This is one of the five island communes in Đồng Tháp province, along with Tân Phú Đông, Tân Long, Long Khánh, and Long Phú Thuận communes.

== Geography ==
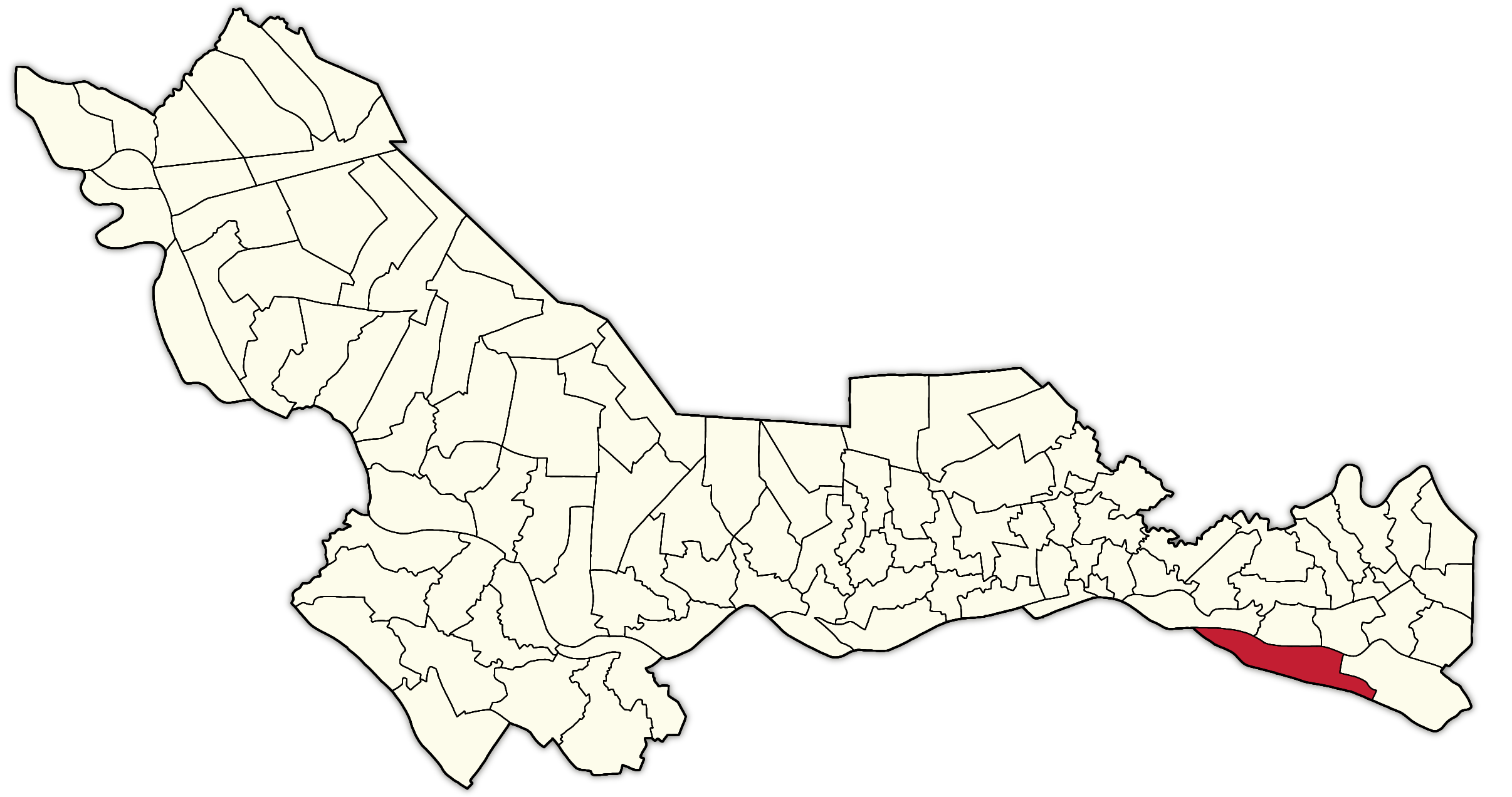
Location of Tân Thới commune on Đồng Tháp province map (highlight in red).

Tân Thới is a commune located in the eastern part of Đồng Tháp province, 135 km east of Cao Lãnh ward, 35 km east of Mỹ Tho ward, and about 20 km southwest of Gò Công ward. The commune has the following geographical location:

- To the southwest and south, it borders Vĩnh Long province.
- To the north, it borders Bình Ninh, Long Bình and Vĩnh Hựu communes.
- To the east, it borders Tân Phú Đông commune.

== History ==
Prior to 2025, Tân Thới commune was formerly Tân Thới, Tân Phú, and Tân Thạnh communes belonging to Tân Phú Đông district, Tiền Giang province.

On June 12, 2025, the National Assembly of Vietnam issued Resolution No. 202/2025/QH15 on the reorganization of provincial-level administrative units. Accordingly:

- Đồng Tháp province was established by merging the entire area and population of Đồng Tháp province and Tiền Giang province.

On June 16, 2025, the Standing Committee of the National Assembly of Vietnam issued Resolution No. 1663/NQ-UBTVQH15 on the reorganization of commune-level administrative units in Đồng Tháp province. Accordingly:

- Tân Thới commune was established by merging the entire area and population of the former Tân Thới, Tân Phú, and Tân Thạnh communes (formerly part of Tân Phú Đông district).
