= Long Bình, Đồng Tháp =

Long Bình
- Commune
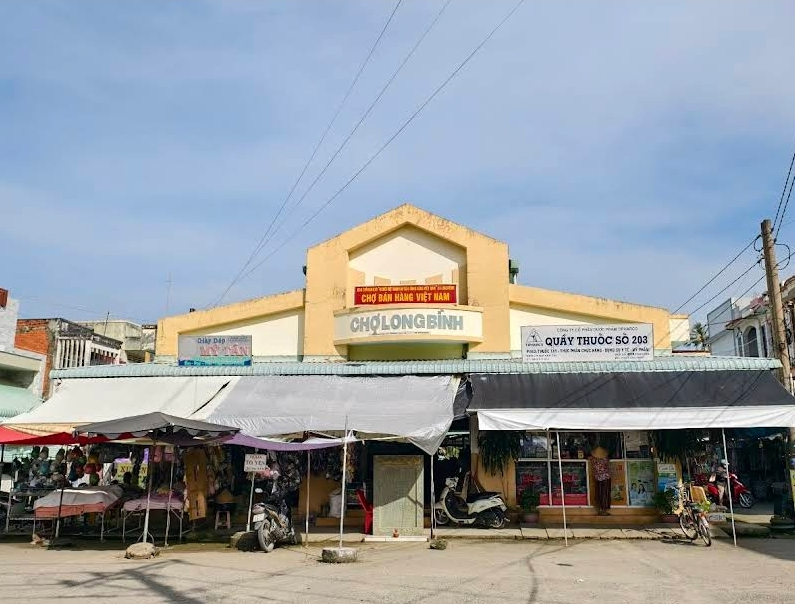
- Long Bình market
- Interactive map of Long Bình
- Country: Vietnam
- Province: Đồng Tháp
- Establish: June 16, 2025

Area
  - Total: 36.62 km^{2} (14.14 sq mi)

Population
  - Total: 30,788 people
  - Density: 840.7/km^{2} (2,178/sq mi)
- Time zone: UTC+07:00

Long Bình is a commune in Đồng Tháp province, Vietnam. It is one of 102 communes and wards in the province following the 2025 reorganization.

== Geography ==
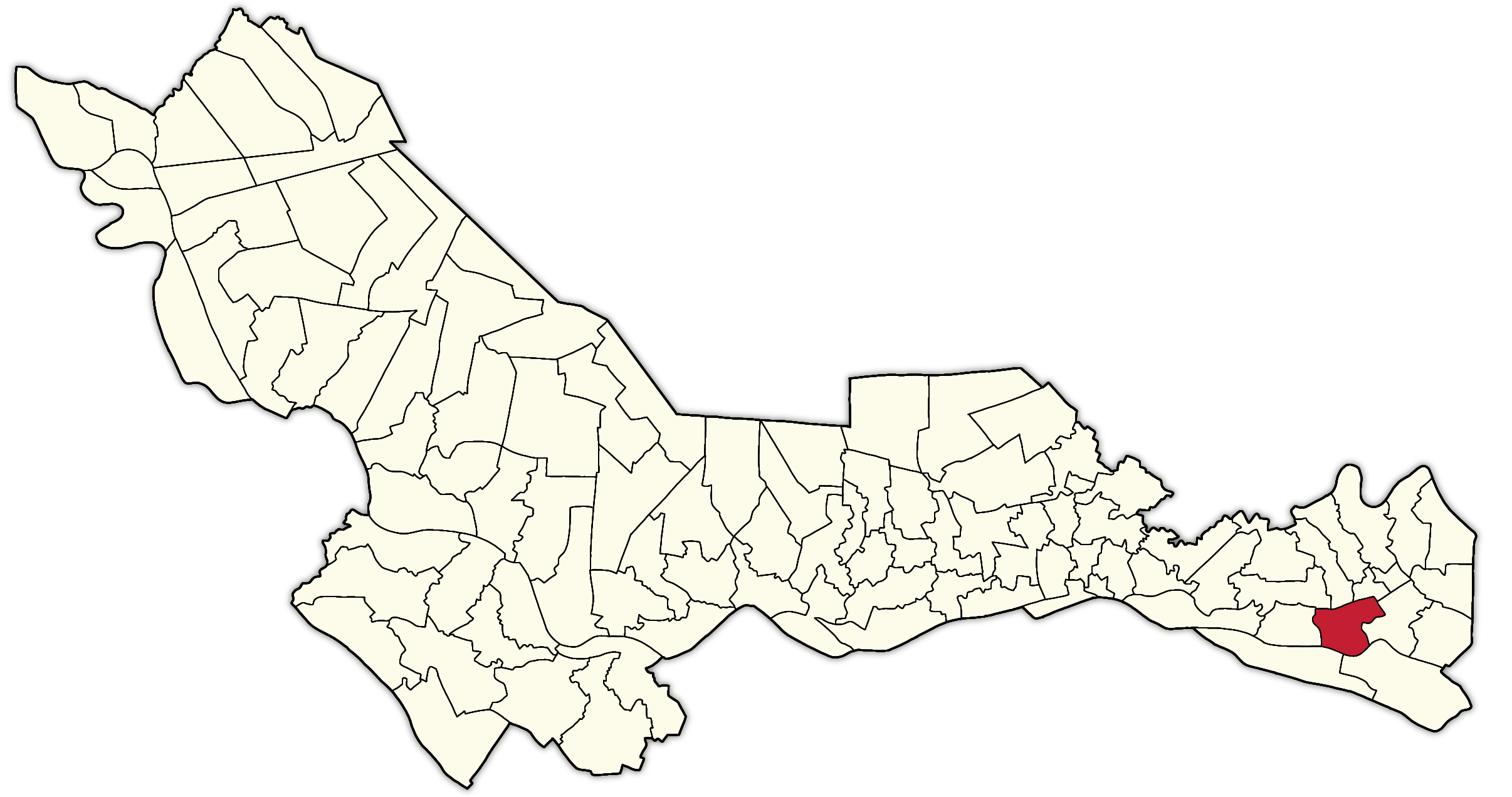
Location of Long Bình commune on Đồng Tháp province map (highlight in red).

Long Bình is a riverside commune along the Tiền river located in the eastern part of Đồng Tháp province. The commune has the following geographical location:

- To the east, it borders Tân Hòa commune.
- To the south, it borders Tân Thới and Tân Phú Đông communes.
- To the west, it borders Vĩnh Hựu commune.
- To the north, it borders Gò Công ward and Phú Thành and Vĩnh Bình communes.

== History ==
Prior to 2025, Long Bình commune was formerly Bình Tân commune and Long Bình commune of Gò Công Tây district, Tiền Giang province.

On June 12, 2025, the National Assembly of Vietnam issued Resolution No. 202/2025/QH15 on the reorganization of provincial-level administrative units. Accordingly:

- Đồng Tháp province was established by merging the entire area and population of Đồng Tháp province and Tiền Giang province.

On June 16, 2025, the Standing Committee of the National Assembly of Vietnam issued Resolution No. 1663/NQ-UBTVQH15 on the reorganization of commune-level administrative units in Đồng Tháp province. Accordingly:

- Long Bình commune was established by merging the entire area and population of Bình Tân commune and Long Bình commune (formerly part of Gò Công Tây district).
