= Mỹ Phong =

- Ward
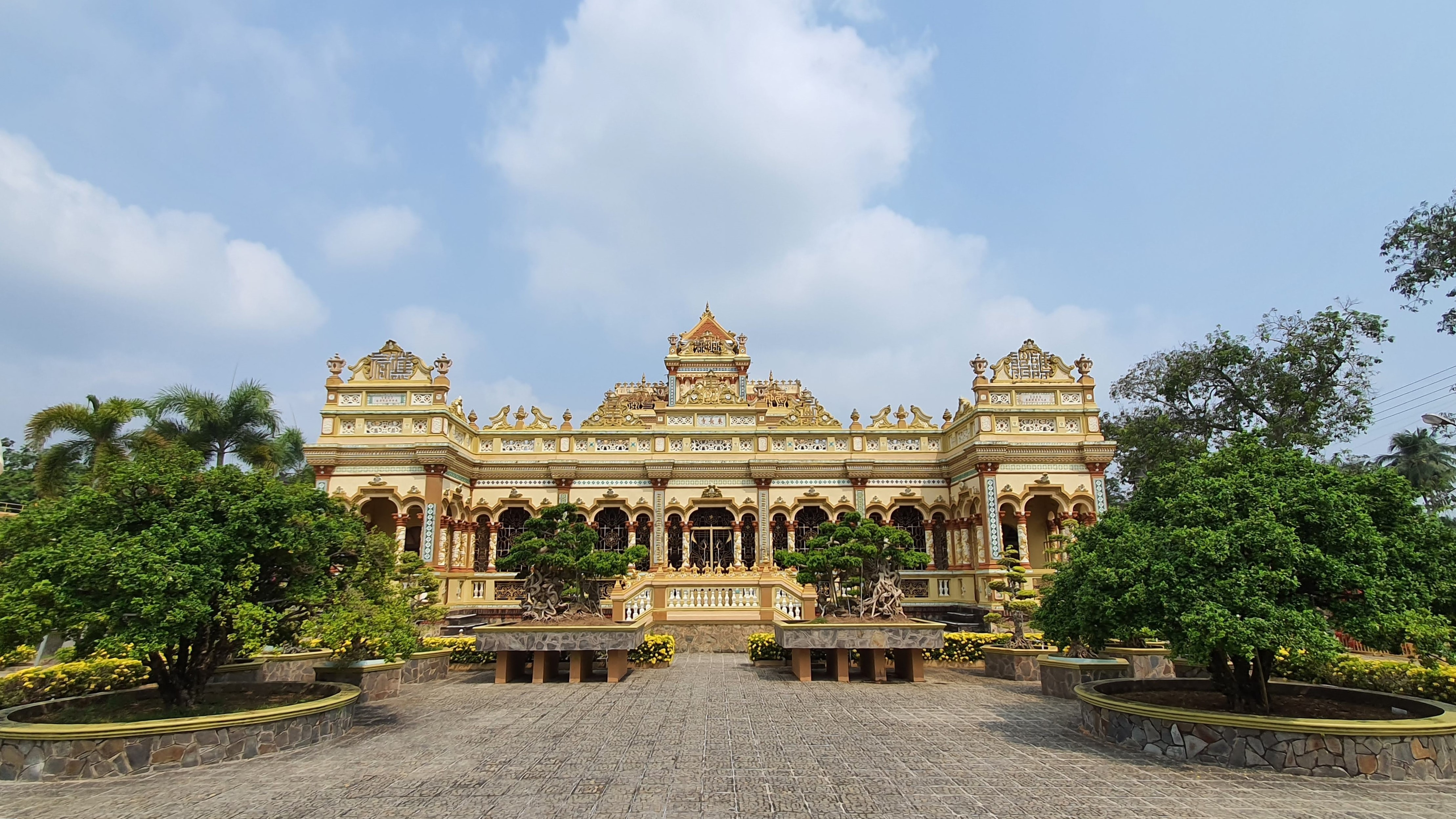
- Vĩnh Tràng Temple
- Interactive map of Mỹ Phong
- Country: Vietnam
- Province: Đồng Tháp
- Establish: June 16, 2025
- Headquarters of the People's Committee: 12, Âu Dương Lân Street, Mỹ Phong ward

Area
  - Total: 23 km^{2} (8.9 sq mi)

Population (2025)
  - Total: 50,731 people
  - Density: 2,200/km^{2} (5,700/sq mi)

Mỹ Phong is a ward in Đồng Tháp province, Vietnam. It is one of 102 communes and wards in the province following the 2025 reorganization.

== Geography ==
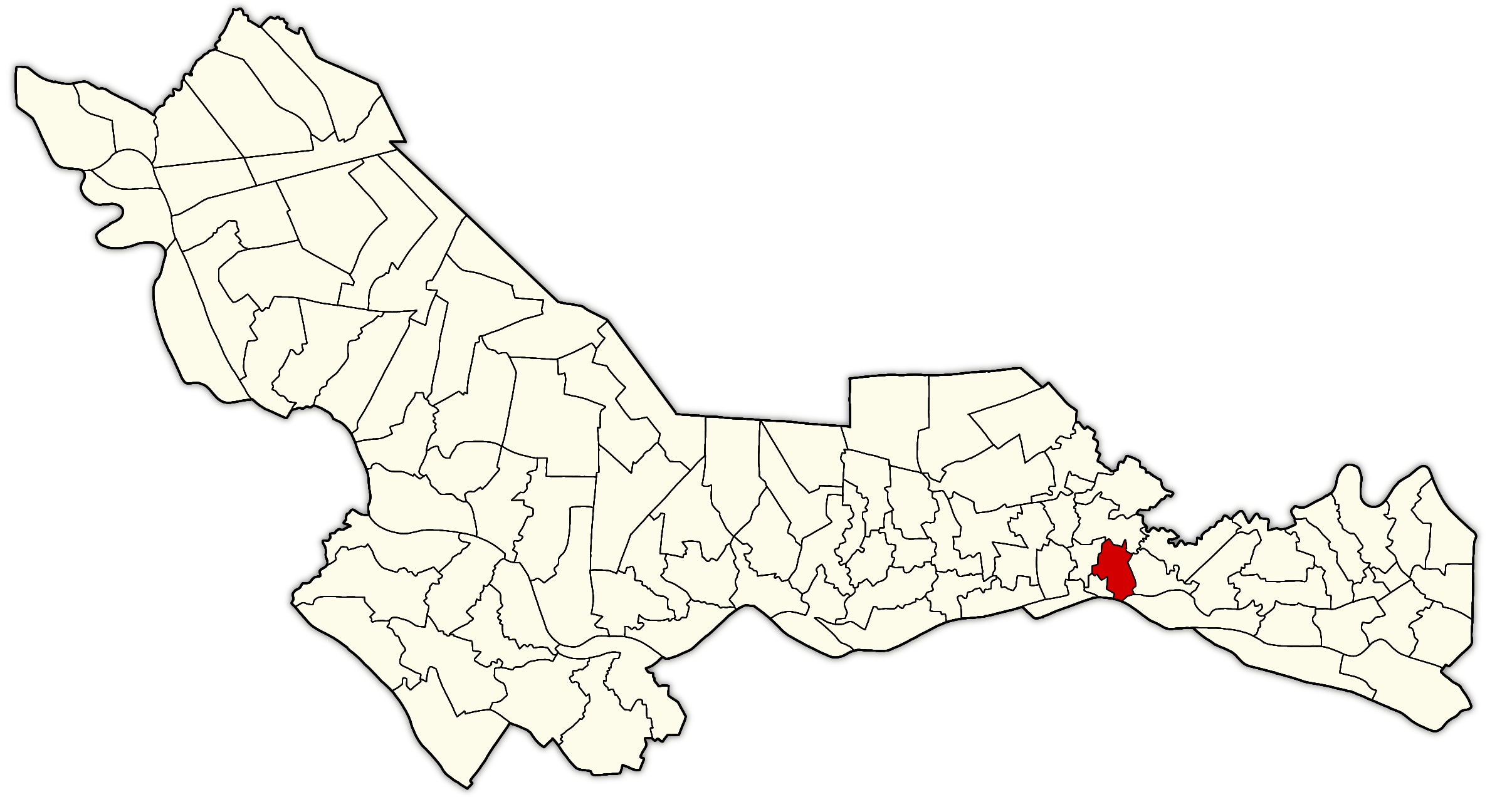
Location of Mỹ Phong ward in Đồng Tháp province map (highlight in red).

Mỹ Phong is a ward located in the eastern part of Đồng Tháp province, 110km east of Cao Lãnh ward and 35km west of Go Cong ward. The ward has a geographical location:

- To the north, it borders Lương Hòa Lạc commune.
- To the west, it borders Đạo Thạnh ward.
- To the south, it borders Mỹ Tho ward and Vĩnh Long province.
- To the east, it borders Chợ Gạo commune and Bình Ninh commune.

== History ==
Prior to 2025, the area of Mỹ Phong ward was formerly ward 9 and two communes: Mỹ Phong and Tân Mỹ Chánh, belonging to Mỹ Tho city, Tiền Giang province.

On June 12, 2025, the 15th National Assembly of Vietnam issued Resolution No. 202/2025/QH15 on the reorganization of provincial-level administrative units. Accordingly:

- The Đồng Tháp province was established by merging the entire area and population of Đồng Tháp province and Tiền Giang province.

On June 16 of the same year, the Standing Committee of the National Assembly of Vietnam issued Resolution No. 1663/NQ-UBTVQH15 on the reorganization of commune-level administrative units in Đồng Tháp province. Accordingly:

- Mỹ Phong ward was established by merging the entire area and population of Ward 9, Mỹ Phong commune, and Tân Chánh Hiệp commune (formerly part of Mỹ Tho city).
