= Vĩnh Hựu =

- Commune
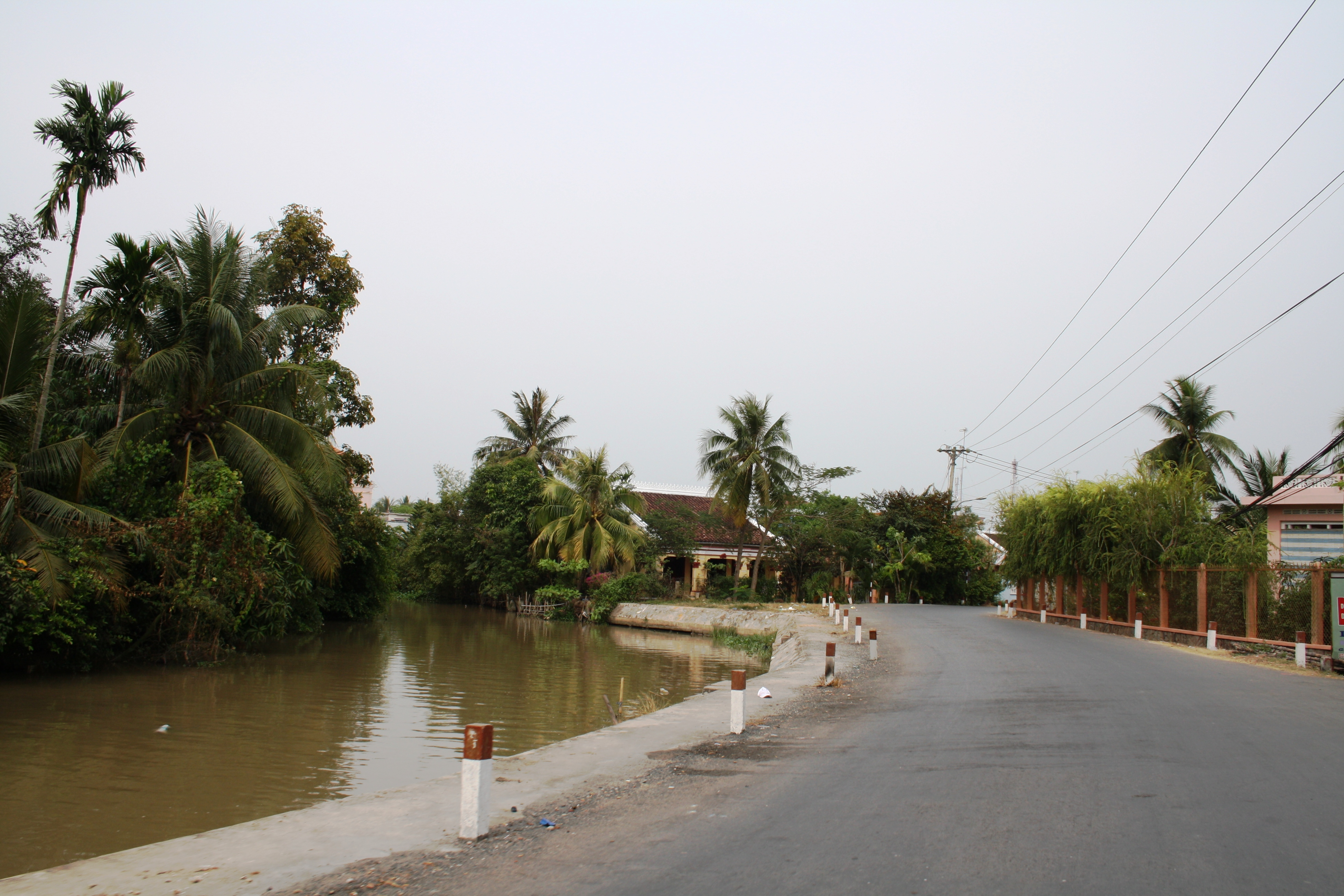
- A road in the commune
- Interactive map of Vĩnh Hựu
- Country: Vietnam
- Province: Đồng Tháp
- Establish: June 16, 2025

Area
  - Total: 31.89 km^{2} (12.31 sq mi)

Population (2025)
  - Total: 24,210 people
  - Density: 759.2/km^{2} (1,966/sq mi)
- Time zone: UTC+07:00

Vĩnh Hựu is a commune in Đồng Tháp province, Vietnam. It is one of 102 communes and wards in the province following the 2025 reorganization.

== Geography ==
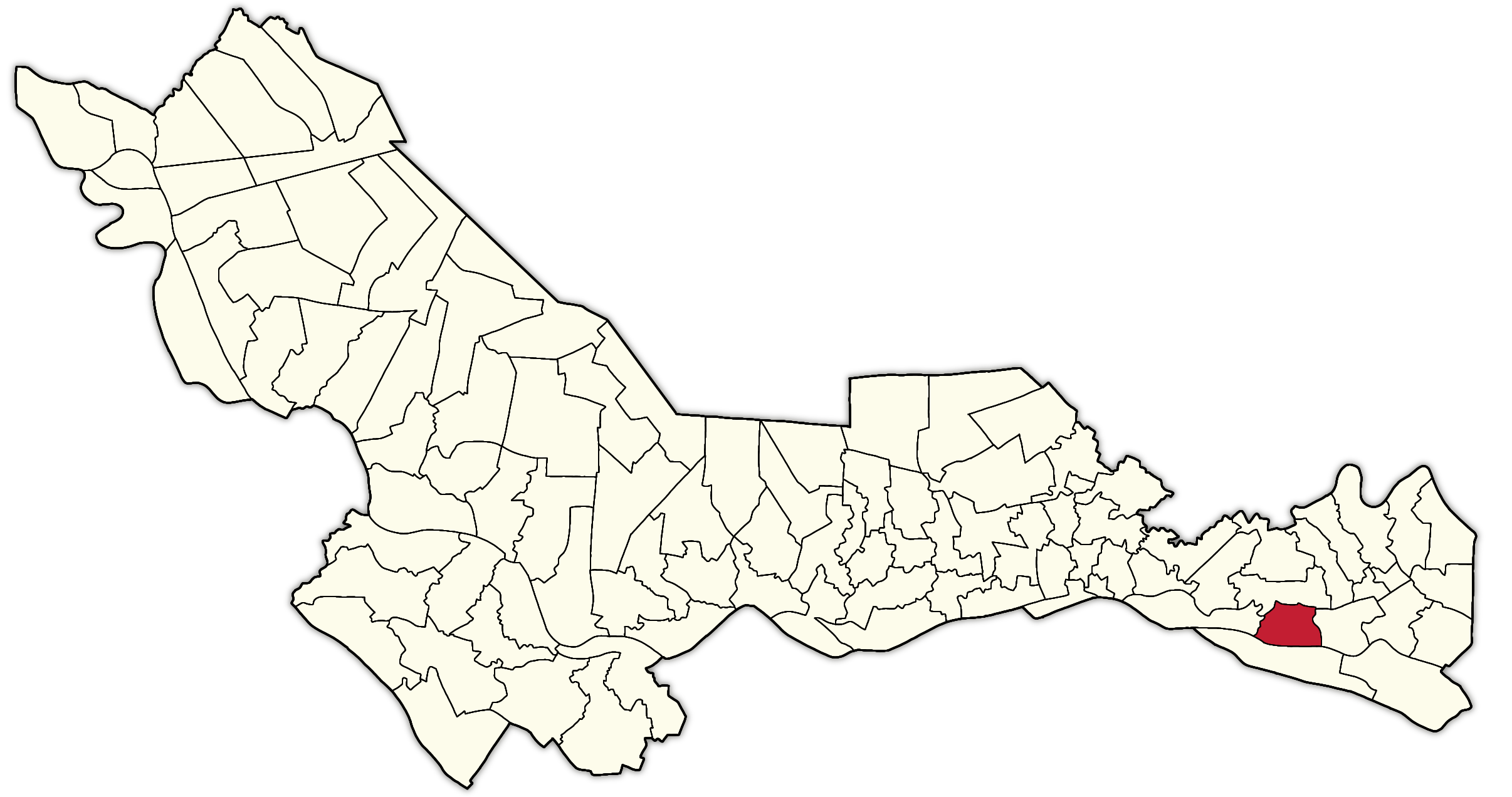
Location of Vĩnh Hựu commune on Đồng Tháp province map (highlight in red).

Vĩnh Hựu is a commune located in the eastern part of Đồng Tháp province, 130km east of Cao Lãnh ward and 15km east of Mỹ Tho ward. The commune has the following geographical location:

- To the east, it borders Long Bình commune.
- To the south, it borders Tân Thới commune.
- To the west, it borders Bình Ninh commune.
- To the north, it borders Vĩnh Bình commune.

== History ==
Prior to 2025, Vĩnh Hựu commune was formerly Long Vĩnh and Vĩnh Hựu communes in Gò Công Tây district, Tiền Giang province.

On June 12, 2025, the National Assembly of Vietnam issued Resolution No. 202/2025/QH15 on the reorganization of provincial-level administrative units. Accordingly:

- Đồng Tháp province was established by merging the entire area and population of Đồng Tháp province and Tiền Giang province.

On June 16, 2025, the Standing Committee of the National Assembly of Vietnam issued Resolution No. 1663/NQ-UBTVQH15 on the reorganization of commune-level administrative units in Đồng Tháp province. Accordingly:

- Vĩnh Hựu commune was established by merging the entire area and population of Long Vĩnh commune and Vĩnh Hựu commune (formerly part of Gò Công Tây district).
