= Bình Xuân =

- Ward
- Interactive map of Bình Xuân
- Coordinates: 10°24′07″N 106°38′16″E
- Country: Vietnam
- Province: Đồng Tháp
- Establish: June 16, 2025

Area
  - Total: 34.4 km^{2} (13.3 sq mi)

Population
  - Total: 32,574 people
  - Density: 947/km^{2} (2,450/sq mi)
- Time zone: UTC+07:00

Bình Xuân is a ward in Đồng Tháp province, Vietnam. It is one of 102 communes and wards in the province following the 2025 reorganization.

== Geography ==
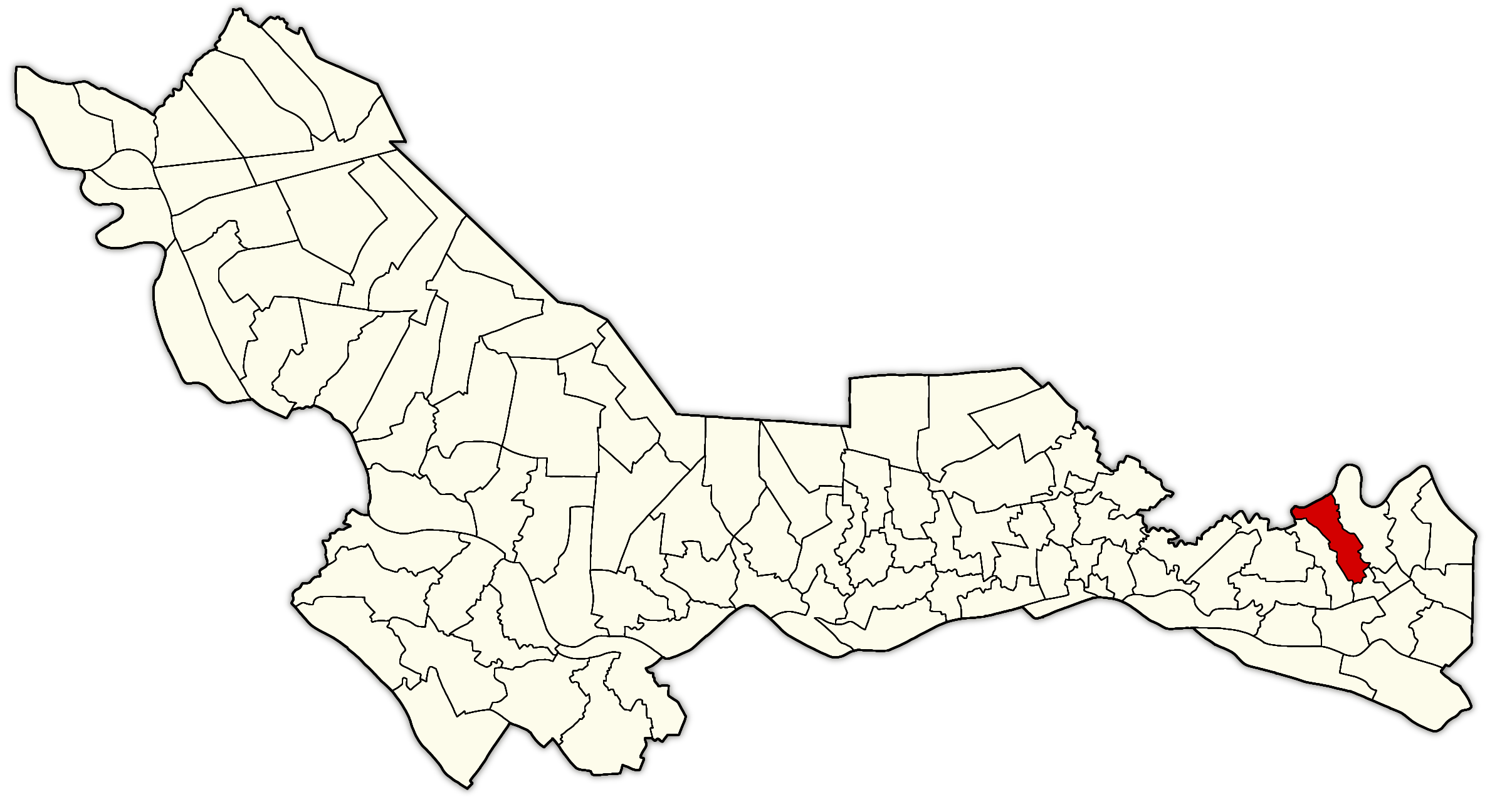
Location of Bình Xuân ward in Đồng Tháp province map (highlight in red).

Bình Xuân is a ward located in the eastern part of Đồng Tháp province, approximately 40km east of Mỹ Tho ward and 135km east of Cao Lãnh ward. The ward has the following geographical location:

- To the north, it borders Tây Ninh province.
- To the south, it borders Gò Công ward.
- To the west, it borders Phú Thành commune.
- To the east, it borders Sơn Qui ward.

== Administrative divisions ==
Bình Xuân ward is divided into 13 neighborhoods: 1, 2, 3, 4, 5, 6, 7, Long Bình, Long Hưng, Long Mỹ, Long Phước, Thành Nhì, Thành Nhứt.

== History ==
Prior to 2025, Bình Xuân ward was formerly Long Chánh ward and Bình Xuân commune, belonging to Gò Công city, Tiền Giang province.

On June 12, 2025, the National Assembly of Vietnam issued Resolution No. 202/2025/QH15 on the reorganization of provincial-level administrative units. Accordingly:

- Đồng Tháp province was established by merging the entire area and population of Đồng Tháp province and Tiền Giang province.

On June 16, 2025, the Standing Committee of the National Assembly of Vietnam issued Resolution No. 1663/NQ-UBTVQH15 on the reorganization of commune-level administrative units in Đồng Tháp province. Accordingly:

- The Bình Xuân ward was established by merging the entire area and population of Long Chánh ward and Bình Xuân commune (formerly part of Gò Công city; Excerpt from Clause 90, Article 1).
