= Đồng Sơn, Đồng Tháp =

Đồng Sơn
- Commune
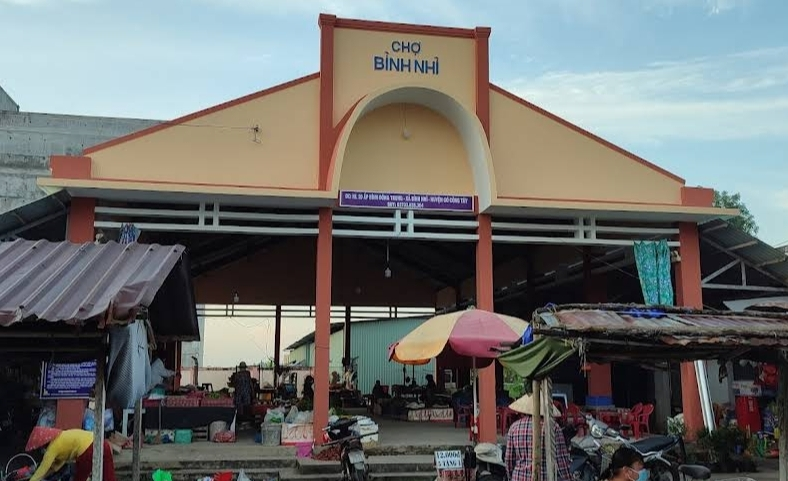
- Bình Nhì market in Đồng Sơn commune.
- Interactive map of Đồng Sơn
- Country: Vietnam
- Province: Đồng Tháp
- Establish: June 16, 2025

Area
  - Total: 44.27 km^{2} (17.09 sq mi)

Population (2025)
  - Total: 40,405 people
  - Density: 912.7/km^{2} (2,364/sq mi)
- Time zone: UTC+07:00

Đồng Sơn is a commune in Đồng Tháp province, Vietnam. It is one of 102 communes and wards in the province following the 2025 reorganization.

== Geography ==
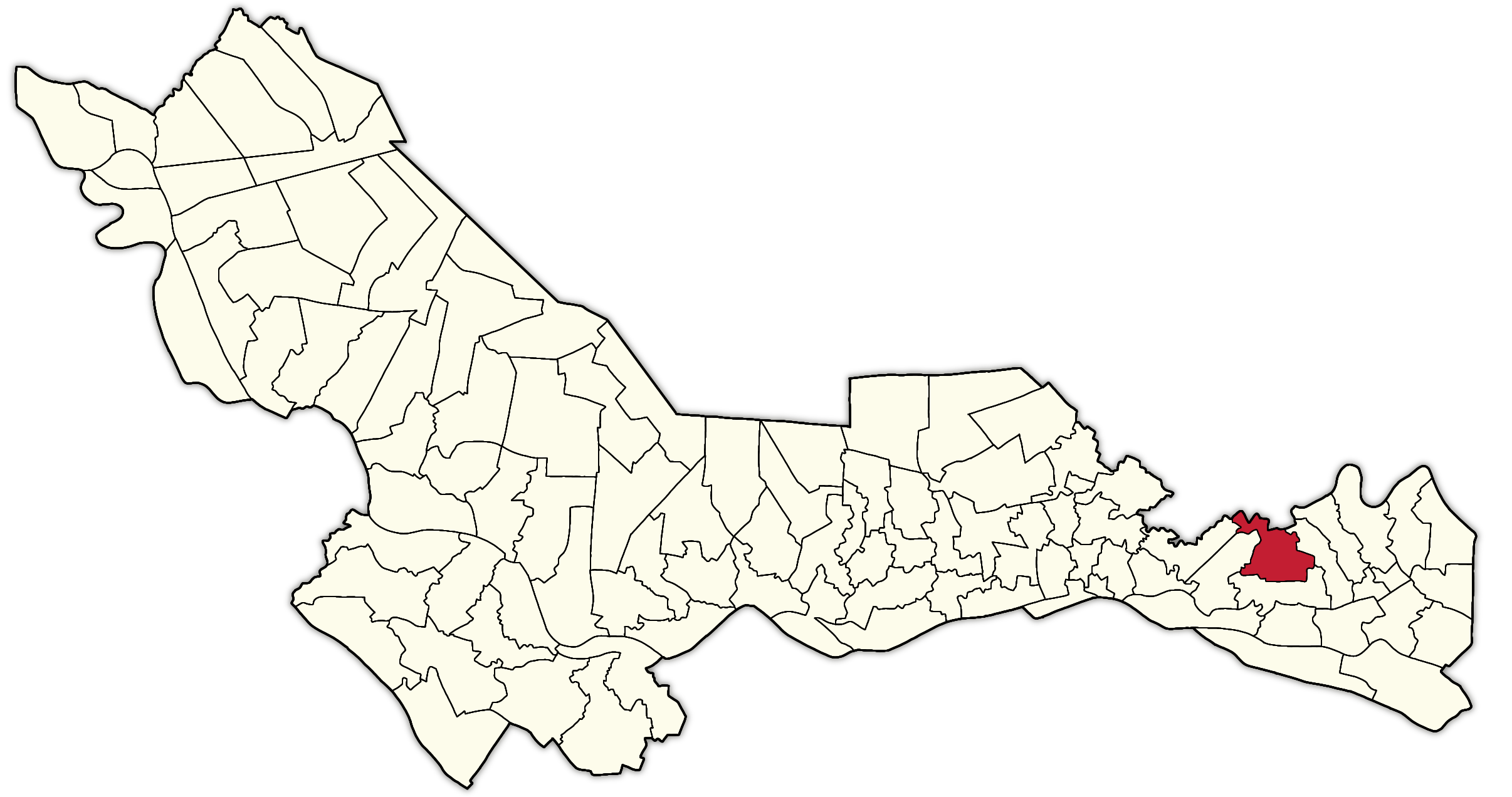
Location of Đồng Sơn commune on Đồng Tháp province map (highlight in red).

Đồng Sơn is a commune located in the eastern part of Đồng Tháp province, 130 kilometres (81 mi) east of Cao Lãnh ward, 30 kilometres (19 mi) east of Mỹ Tho ward, and 15 kilometres (9.3 mi) west of Gò Công ward. The commune has a geographical location:

- To the south, it borders Vĩnh Bình commune.
- To the west, it borders Tân Thuận Bình and An Thạnh Thủy communes.
- To the north, it borders Tây Ninh province.
- To the east, it borders Phú Thành commune.

== History ==
Before 2025, Đồng Sơn commune was formerly Bình Nhì, Đồng Thạnh, and Đồng Sơn communes in Gò Công Tây district, Tiền Giang province.

On June 12, 2025, the National Assembly of Vietnam issued Resolution No. 202/2025/QH15 on the reorganization of provincial-level administrative units. Accordingly:

- Đồng Tháp province was established by merging the entire area and population of Đồng Tháp province and Tiền Giang province.

On June 16, 2025, the Standing Committee of the National Assembly of Vietnam issued Resolution No. 1663/NQ-UBTVQH15 on the reorganization of commune-level administrative units in Đồng Tháp province. Accordingly:

- Đồng Sơn commune was established by merging the entire area and population of Bình Nhì commune, Đồng Thạnh commune, and Đồng Sơn commune (formerly part of Gò Công Tây district).
