= Chợ Gạo district =

Coordinates: 10.367°N 106.467°E

Chợ Gạo district Huyện Chợ Gạo
- District
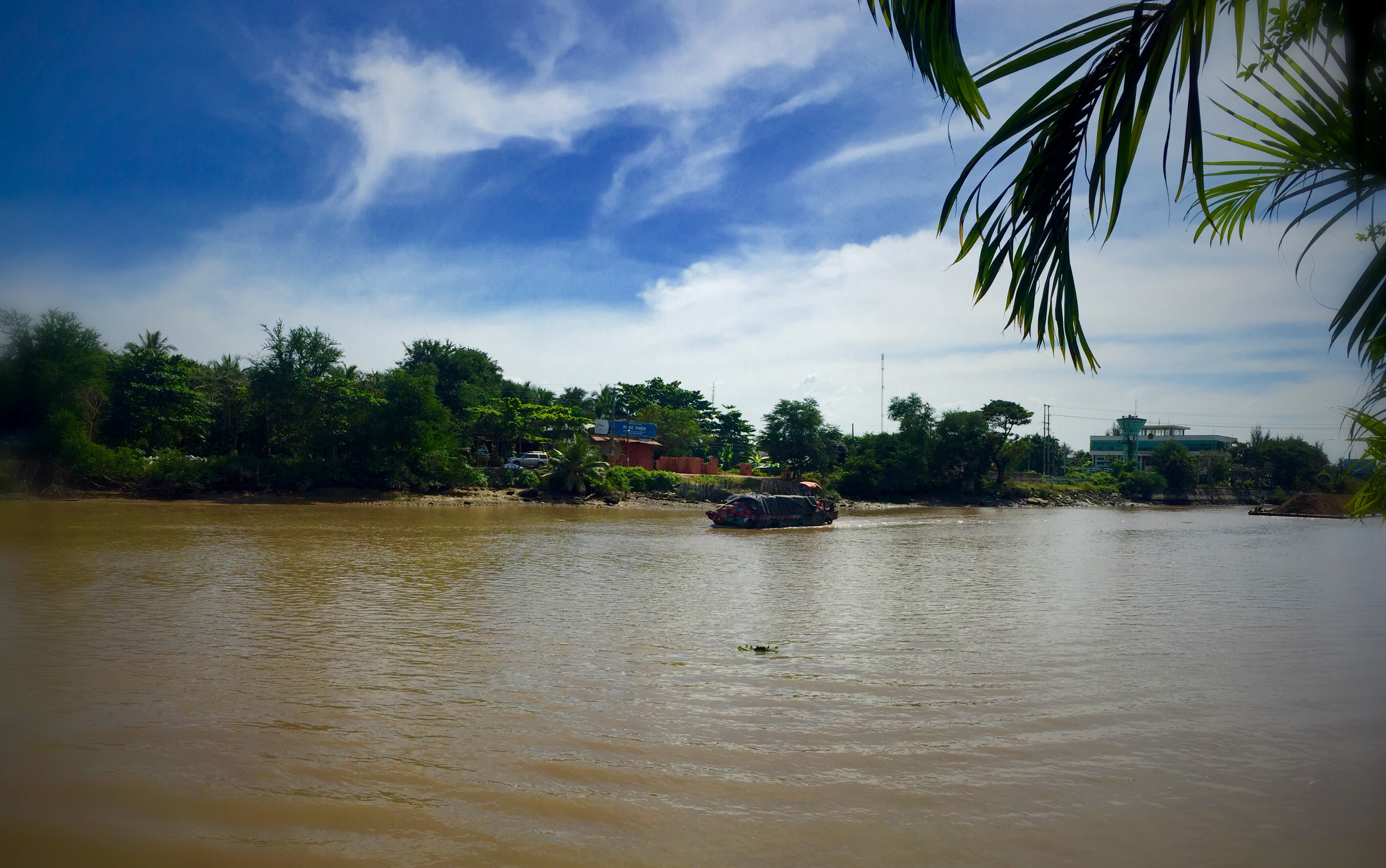
- River in Tien Giang

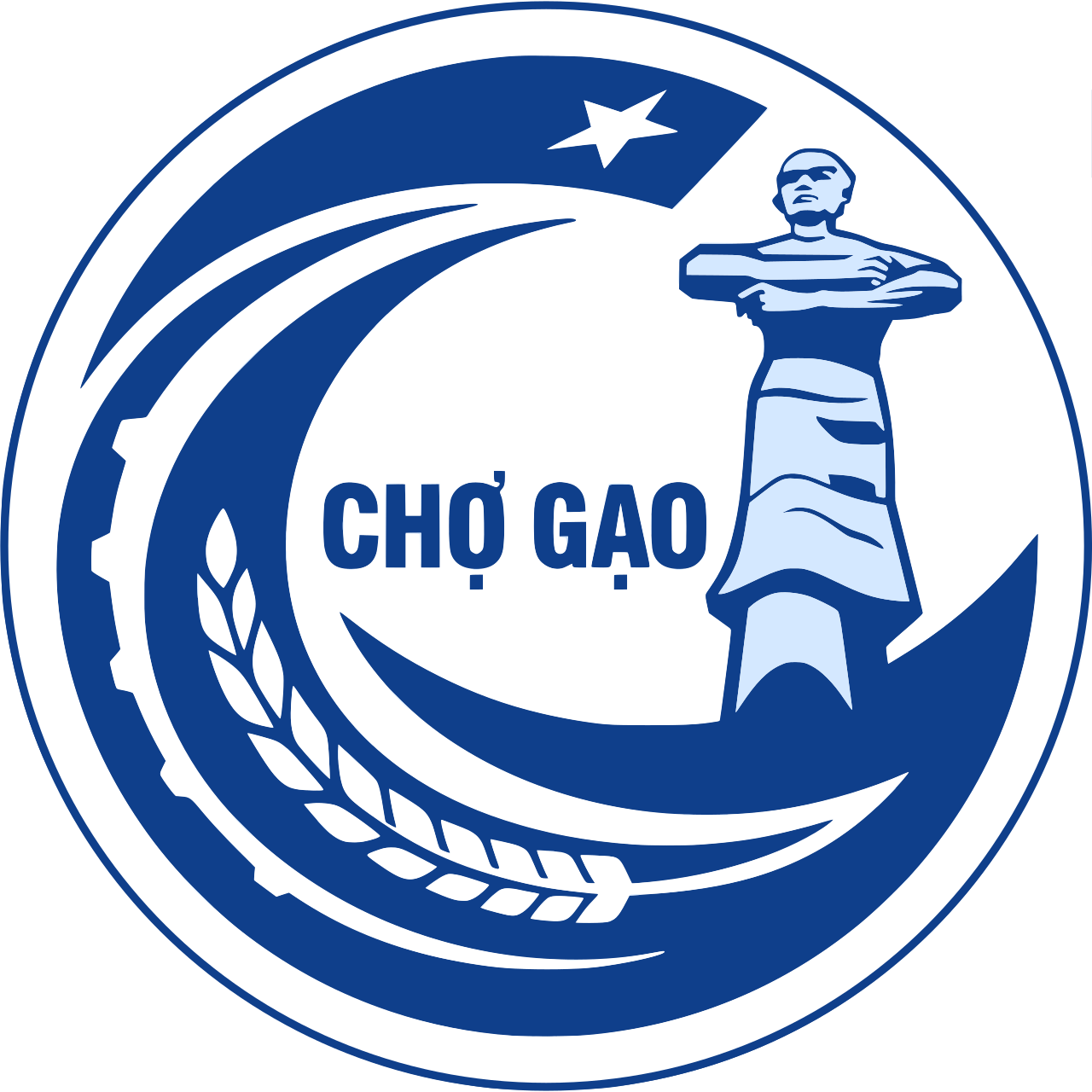
- Seal
- Interactive map of Chợ Gạo district
- Country: Vietnam
- Region: Mekong Delta
- District: Tiền Giang
- Capital: Chợ Gạo

Area
  - Total: 91 sq mi (235 km^{2})

Population (2003)
  - Total: 185,807
- Time zone: UTC+7 (UTC + 7)

Chợ Gạo (chữ Nôm: 𢄂𥺊), meaning "Rice Market", is a rural district (huyện) of Tiền Giang province in the Mekong Delta region of Vietnam. As of 2003, the district had a population of 185,807. The district covers an area of 235 km^{2} (91 sq mi). The district capital lies at Chợ Gạo.

== History ==
Cho Gao originated in a market located in Binh Phan Village (the name says camp from Binh Phuong), founded by Mr. Tran Van Nguyet in the Canh Hung period (the reign of King Le Hien Tong). According to Le Quy Don's Phu Bien Tap Luc, at the end of the 18th century.

The market was originally formed because there was the first rice factory in the area built and owned by a Chinese family. The factory is located next to the river at the foot of the Quay Bridge, now known as the Old Binh Phan Bridge. Gradually, people in the surrounding areas also followed the river branch and brought rice to the factory to build a corpse for rice. Traders also concentrated on buying and buying by waterway to the Tien River and then brought to Saigon. From there, the name Cho Gao was formed.

== Geography ==
Cho Gao district is located in the east of Tien Giang province, with the geographical location:

To the east, it borders the Go Cong Tay district

To the west, it borders My Tho City and Chau Thanh district

To the south, it borders Tan Phu Dong District and Chau Thanh District, Binh Dai District in Ben Tre province

It borders Tan An City and Chau Thanh district to the north in Long An province.

== Acreage and population ==
The district has an area of 235 km² and a population of 186,803 (in 2019). The district capital is Cho Gao town, located on National Highway 50, 10 km east of My Tho. It also has the Cho Gao River, which is an arterial river route connecting Ho Chi Minh City with the provinces of the Mekong Delta.

== Administrative ==
Cho Gao district has 19 commune-level administrative units, including Cho Gao town (district capital) and 18 communes.
