= Gò Công =

Former provincial city of the former Tiền Giang province, Vietnam

- Provincial city (Class-3)
- Gò Công City; Thành phố Gò Công
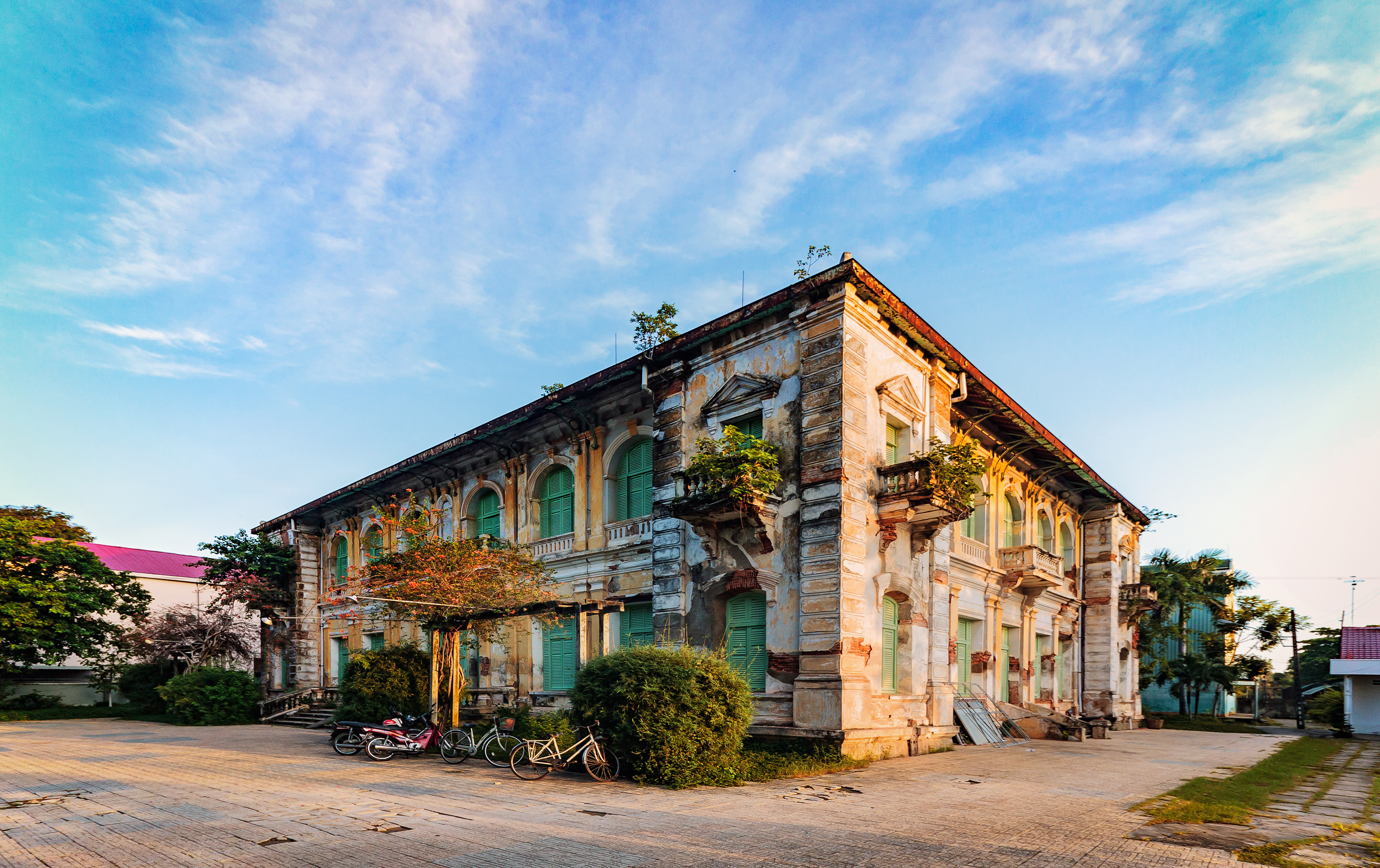
- Chánh Tham Biện Palace (Note: Administateur Palace), Gò Công city

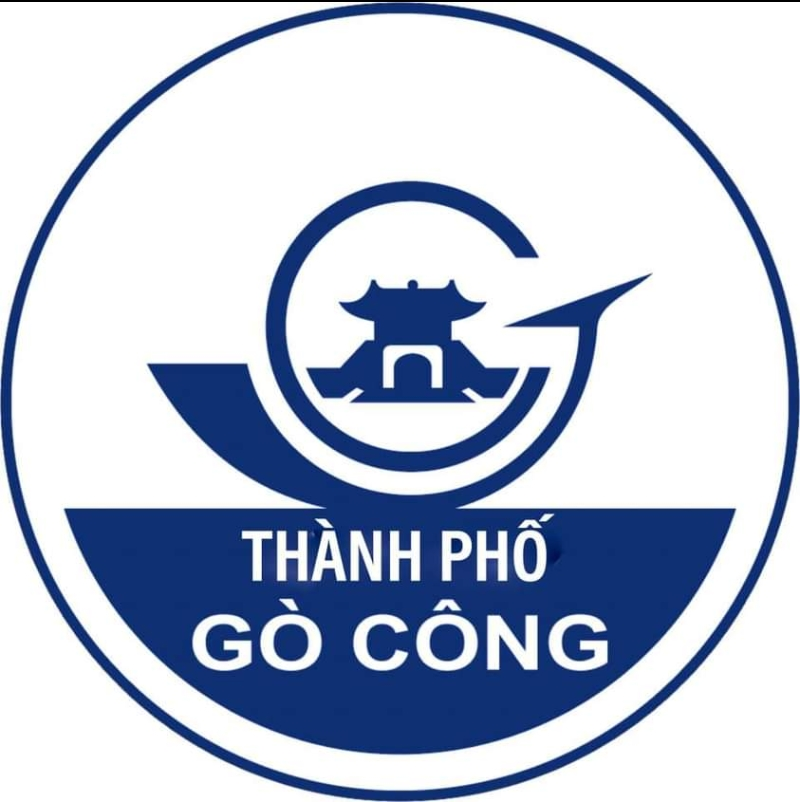
- Seal
- Interactive map of Gò Công
- Location of Gò Công in Vietnam
- Coordinates: 10°22′N 106°40′E
- Country: Vietnam
- Province: Tiền Giang
- Founded: February 16, 1987

Government
  - Chairman of the People's Committee: Giản Bá Huỳnh
  - Secretary: Nguyễn Kiên Cường

Area
  - Total: 102.3588 km^{2} (39.5210 sq mi)

Population (December 31, 2022)
  - Total: 151,937
  - Density: 1,484.36/km^{2} (3,844.47/sq mi)
- Postal code: 84300
- Website: gocong.tiengiang.gov.vn

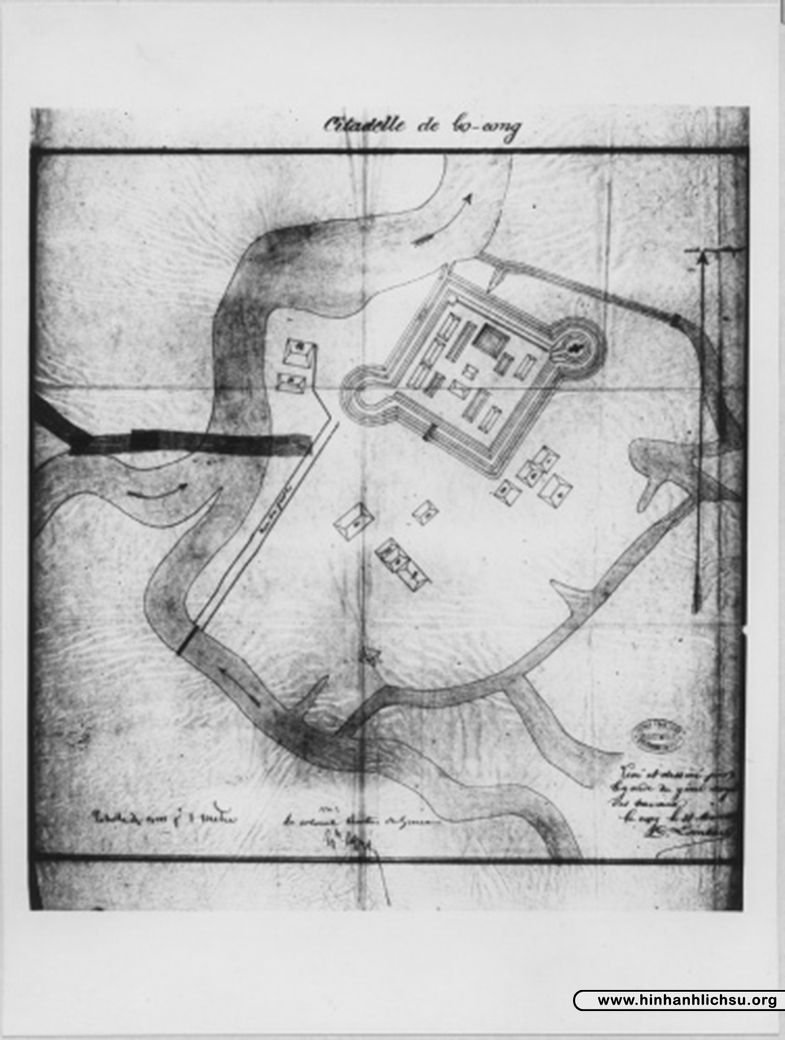
Drawing of Gò Công citadel in 1863

Gò Công is a former provincial city (thành phố thuộc tỉnh) of Tiền Giang province in the Mekong Delta region of Vietnam. The city of Gò Công is not to be confused with East Gò Công and West Gò Công Districts (Vietnamese: huyện Gò Công Đông and huyện Gò Công Tây) which also belong to the Tiền Giang Province.

== The Royal Mausoleums ==
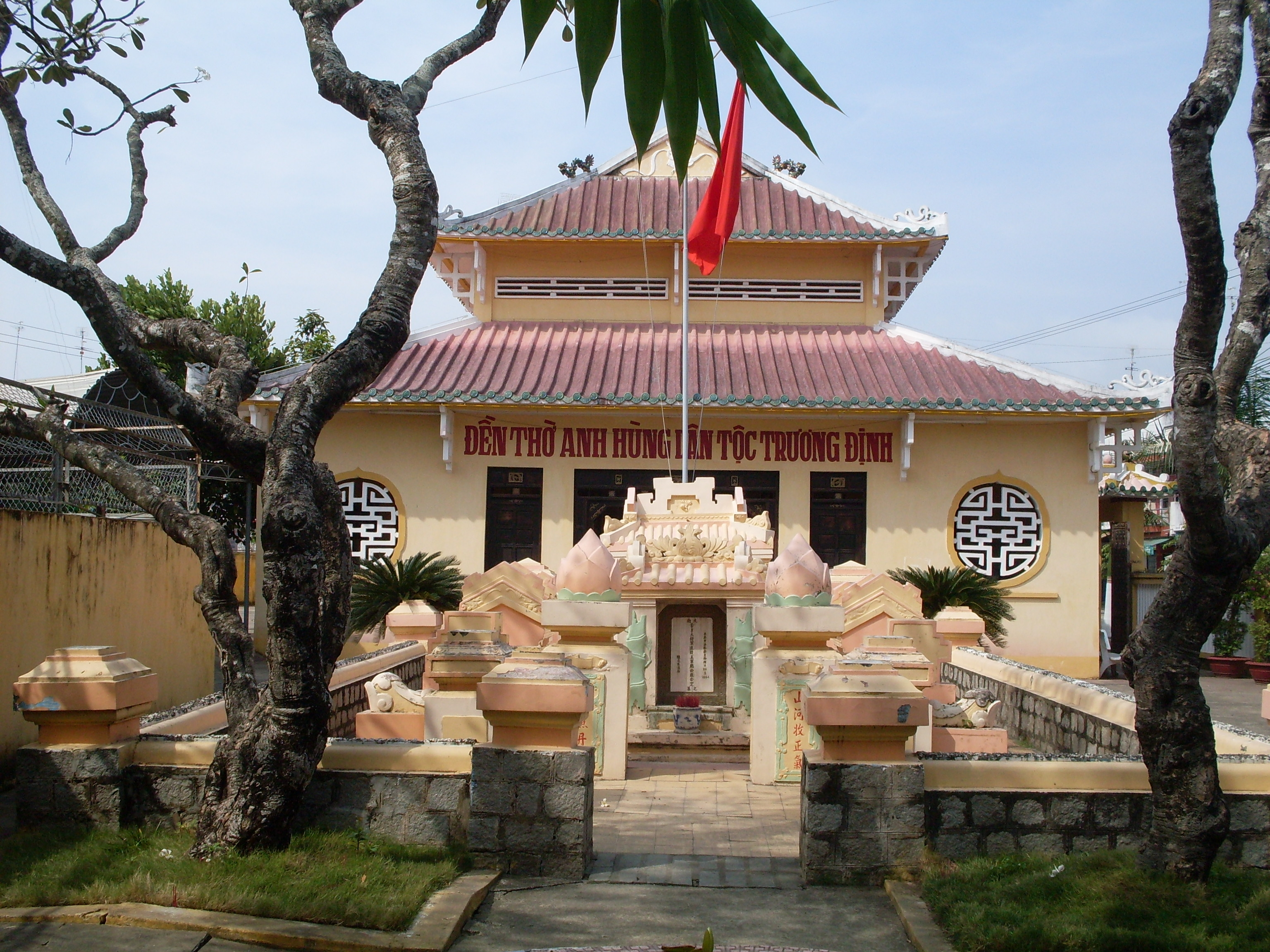
Trương Định temple

Gò Công city is characterized by its numerous canals, orchards, and fields. It is notable for the Lăng Hoàng Gia (Royal Mausoleums), an ancient architectural complex. The mausoleum complex is situated in Long Hung Commune, in Gò Công Town, near National Highway 50, approximately 30 kilometers from Mỹ Tho Town. This site serves as the burial place for members of the Pham Dang lineage, a prominent clan of mandarins and courtiers in the southern region during the 18th and 19th centuries.

=== The complex ===
The mausoleums for the deceased aristocrats are constructed facing each other on both sides of a road, covering an area of nearly 3,000 square meters. The complex is enclosed by a wall measuring 80 centimeters in thickness and 90 centimeters in height. The gate, which is now covered with moss, leads to a path lined with two rows of pines that direct visitors to the mausoleums.

=== Construction ===
The mausoleums were built by locals and carpenters from Huế in the central region. Therefore, the complex reflects a traditional Huế architectural style. Several kinds of wood were used in the construction of the mausoleum, mostly brought in from the then feudal capital of Huế. No nails were used to connect the wooden pillars, rafters or roof beams of the complex. Wooden tablets with sacred oriental animals and flowers are carved into the surface of much of the wood, creating a great solemnity inside the mausoleums, while imposing pillars add a majesty to the complex.

=== The Grand Duke ===
Among the 13 mausoleums built between 1811 and the early 20th century, the mausoleum of Grand Duke Phạm Đăng Hưng—father of Queen Consort Từ Dụ (Phạm Thị Hằng) of the Government of the Nguyễn dynasty (1802–1945) and maternal grandfather of King Tự Đức (1829–1883)—is the most impressive of all. It is located on a mound covering more than 800 square meters and according to local residents, the grand duke was buried in a sitting position inside a two-layered coffin.
