= Gò Công Tây district =

Coordinates: 10.333°N 106.583°E

Gò Công Tây district Huyện Gò Công Tây
- District
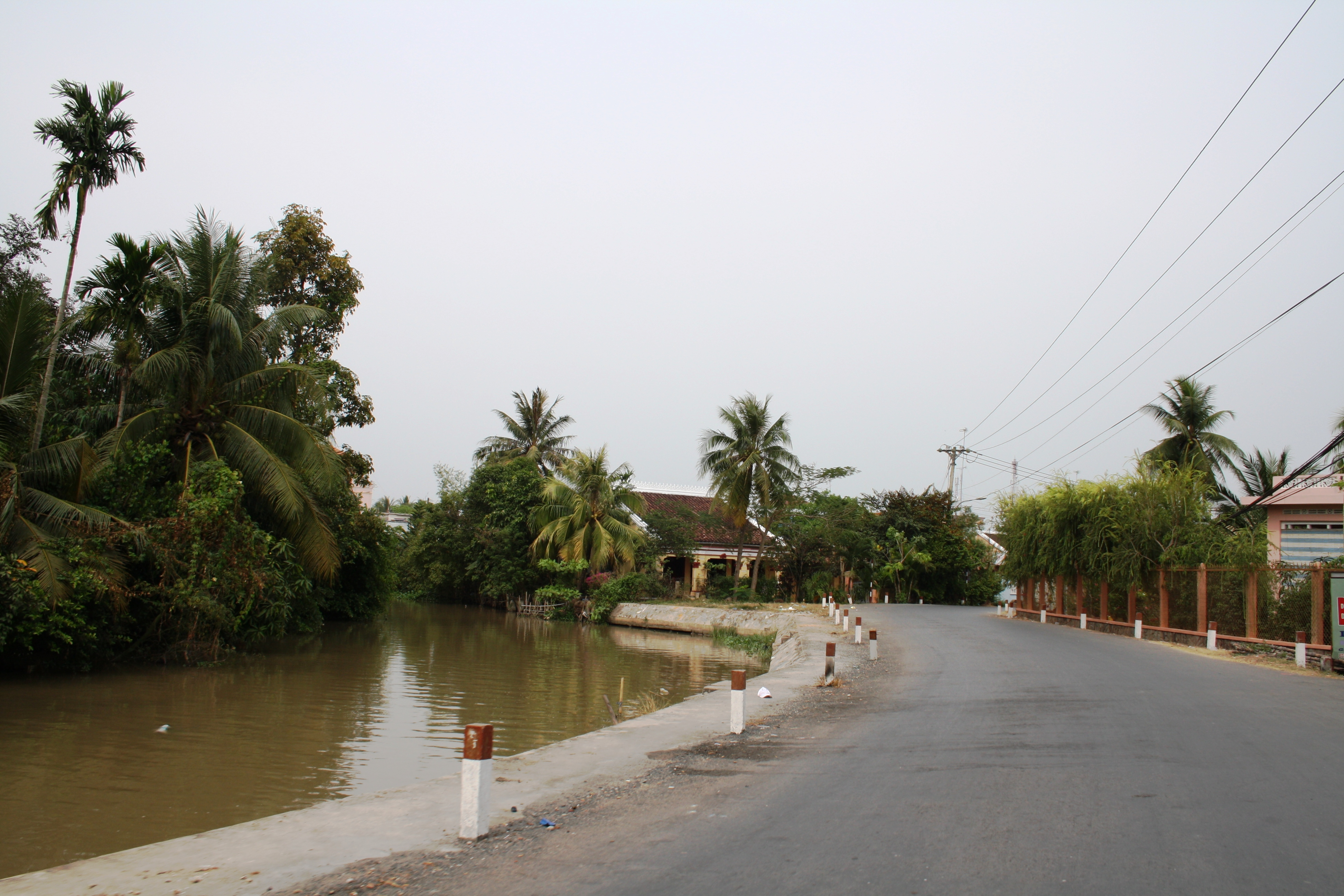
- Interactive map of Gò Công Tây district
- Country: Vietnam
- Region: Mekong Delta
- Province: Tiền Giang
- Capital: Vĩnh Bình

Area
  - Total: 105 sq mi (272 km^{2})

Population (2003)
  - Total: 166,487
- Time zone: UTC+7 (UTC + 7)

Gò Công Tây (or West Gò Công) is a rural district (huyện) of Tiền Giang province in the Mekong Delta region of Vietnam, was established in 13 April 1979. As of 2003 the district had a population of 166,487. The district covers an area of 272 km^{2} (105 sq mi). The district capital lies at Vĩnh Bình.
