= Gò Công, Đồng Tháp =

Ward in Đồng Tháp province, Vietnam

Gò Công
- Ward
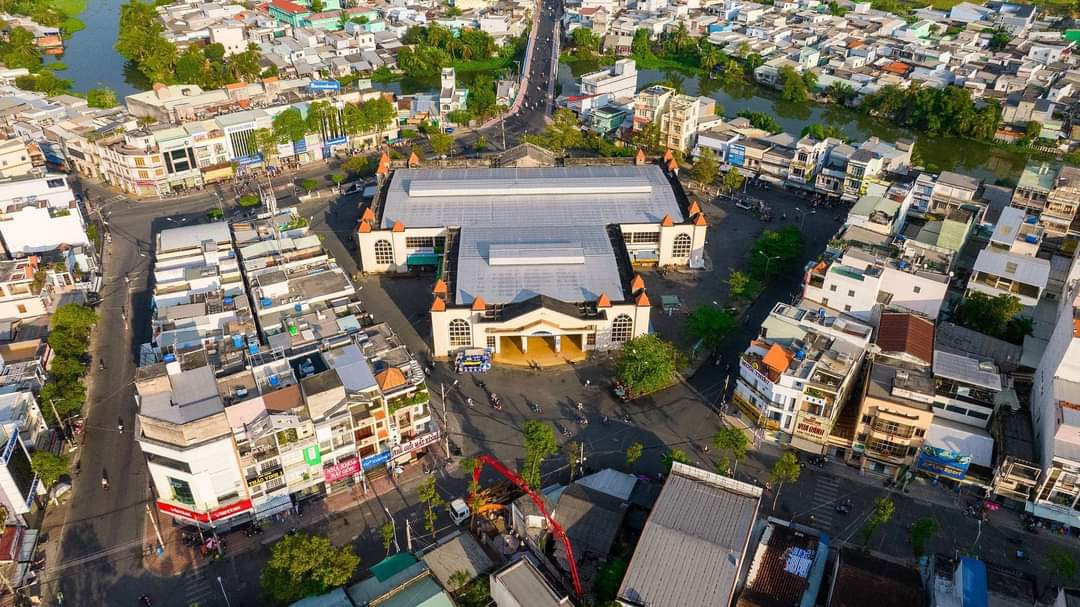
- The new Gò Công market in Gò Công ward.
- Interactive map of Gò Công
- Country: Vietnam
- Region: Mekong Delta
- Province: Đồng Tháp
- Establish: June 16, 2026

Area
  - Total: 10.1 km^{2} (3.9 sq mi)

Population (2025)
  - Total: 36,124
  - Density: 3,580/km^{2} (9,260/sq mi)
- Administrative code: 28306
- Website: http://gocong.dongthap.gov.vn/

Gò Công is a ward in Đồng Tháp province, Vietnam. This is one of the 102 communes and wards in the province.

== Geography ==
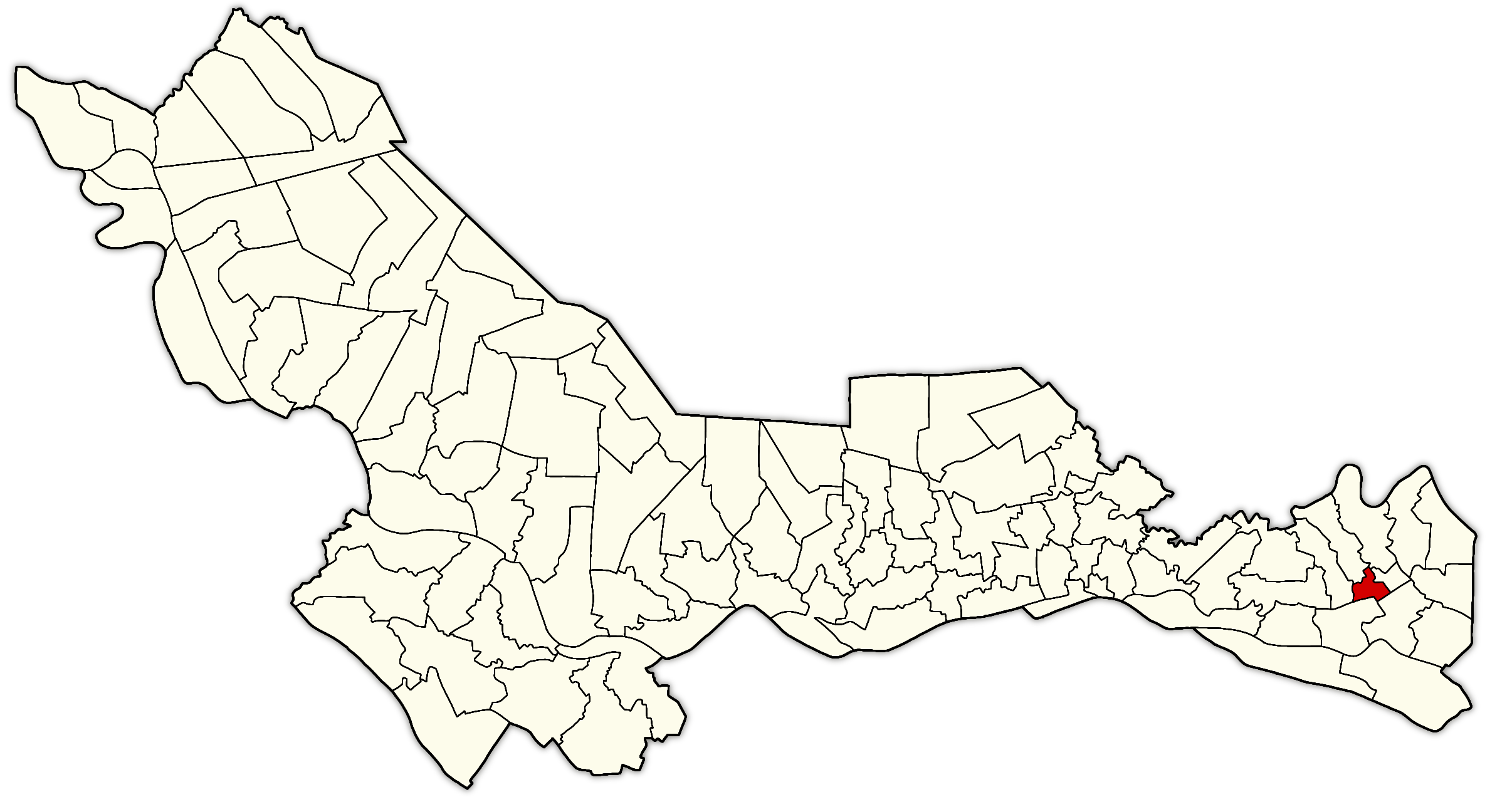
Location of Gò Công ward in Đồng Tháp province map (highlight in red).

Gò Công is a ward located in the eastern part of Đồng Tháp province. Located 135km east of Cao Lãnh ward and 40km east of Mỹ Tho ward. The ward has the following geographical location:

- To the east, it borders Long Thuận ward.
- To the north, it borders Bình Xuân ward and Sơn Qui ward.
- To the west, it borders the Phú Thành commune.
- To the south, it borders the Tân Hòa commune and the Long Bình commune.

== History ==
Before 2025, Gò Công ward consisted of wards 1, 5, and Long Hòa of Gò Công city.

June 12, 2025, the 15th National Assembly of Vietnam issued Resolution No. 202/2025/QH15 on the rearrangement of provincial-level administrative units. Accordingly, the entire natural area and population size of Tiền Giang province and Đồng Tháp province will be combined into a new province called Đồng Tháp province.

On June 16, 2025, the Standing Committee of the National Assembly of Vietnam issued Resolution No. 1663/NQ-UBTVQH15 on the rearrangement of commune-level administrative units in Đồng Tháp province in 2025. Accordingly:

- The entire natural area and population size of Ward 1, Ward 5, and Long Hòa Ward of the former Gò Công city are reorganized into a new ward named Gò Công Ward.

== Administrative division ==
Gò Công ward has 18 neighborhoods: 1, 2, 3, 4, 5, 6, 7, 8, 9, 10, 11, 12A, 12B, Chợ Mới, Kim Liên, Việt Hùng, Tân Xã, and Giồng Mới.
