= Tiền Giang province =

Former province of Vietnam (1976 – 2025)

Tiền Giang Định Tường
- Province
- Tiền Giang province
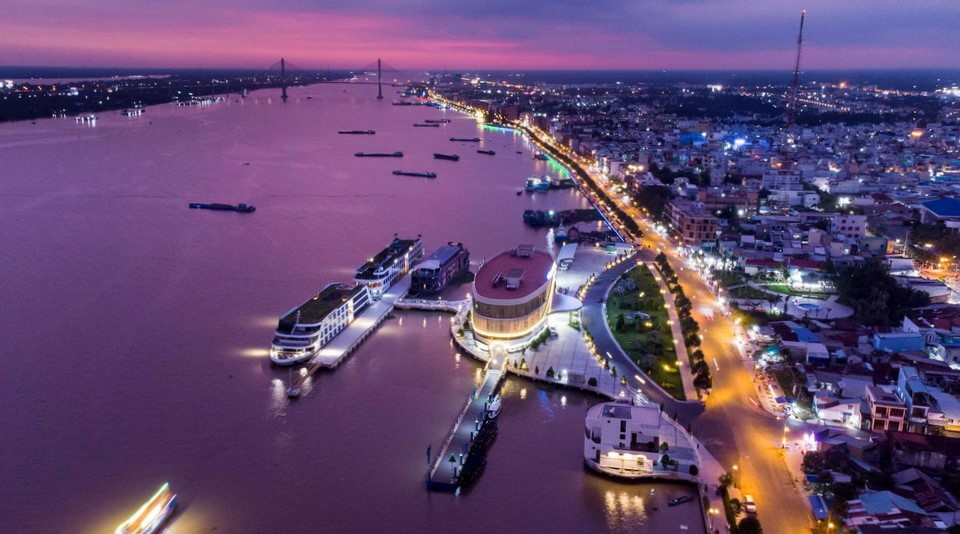
- Mỹ Tho

- Seal
- Nicknames: Anterior River; The Kingdom of Fruits
- Location of Tiền Giang within Vietnam

- Location within Vietnam Location within Asia
- Coordinates: 10°25′N 106°10′E
- Country: Vietnam
- Region: Mekong Delta
- Metropolitan area: Ho Chi Minh City metropolitan area
- Capital: Mỹ Tho

Government
  - People's Council Chair: Nguyễn Văn Danh
  - People's Committee Chair: Lê Văn Hưởng
  - Secretary of Tiền Giang Party Committee: Nguyễn Văn Danh

Area
  - Total: 2,556.36 km^{2} (987.02 sq mi)

Population (2025)
  - Total: 2,261,196
  - Density: 884.537/km^{2} (2,290.94/sq mi)

Demographics
  - Ethnicities: Vietnamese, Hoa, Khmer, Chăm

GDP
  - Total: VND 123.048 trillion US$ 5.162 billion (2023)
- Time zone: UTC+7 (ICT)
- Calling code: 0273
- ISO 3166 code: VN-46
- HDI (2020): ▲0.698 (38th)
- Website: tiengiang.gov.vn

Tiền Giang was a former province in the Mekong Delta region of southern Vietnam (this is now the eastern part of Đồng Tháp province).

The province was formed in February 1976, by the merger of Định Tường and Gò Công provinces of former Republic of Vietnam.

Tiền Giang had an advantage of being located between two important economic regions – the Southern Key Economic Zone (SKEZ) and the Mekong Delta. The province is a gateway to Ho Chi Minh City (HCMC) and other eastern provinces as well as those of the Mekong Delta through its system of 150 kilometres (93 mi) road, one expressway, four National Roads (1, 30, 50 and 60). The coastline is 32 kilometres (20 mi) long with thousands of coastal warp, which is an advantage for aquatic breeding such as crab and sea-based economic development.

Mỹ Tho City, acting the leading role of socioeconomic and politic center of Tiền Giang, is the major junction of education, culture and tourism for nearby provinces. The city is 70 kilometres (43 mi) away from Ho Chi Minh City to the south and 90 kilometres (56 mi) away from Cần Thơ City to the east.

On June 12, 2025, Tiền Giang was incorporated into Đồng Tháp province.

== Geography ==
Tiền Giang province features a tropical climate divided into distinct wet and dry seasons, with an average temperature of 27°C. Vietnamese settlers began migrating to the area from Ngu Quang in the 17th century to clear land, establish agricultural production, and develop settlements. The region encompasses diverse ecosystems—including marine, canal, mound, and the Đồng Tháp Mười depression—which support varied flora and fauna. Local specialties include My Tho noodles and regional fruit varieties such as durian, star apple, jackfruit, rambutan, and pineapple.

With a total area of 2,510.5 square kilometres (969.3 sq mi), Tiền Giang stretches along the north of Tiền River for 120 kilometres (75 mi), accounting for about 6% of SKEZ, and 0.7 of the national area. Overall, thanks to its geographic location, economic condition, road and waterway transportation, Tiền Giang province has various advantages in using natural resources, developing goods production, expanding consumption market for its products, reinforcing its ability of cooperation and exchange in terms of economics, culture and tourism with other provinces in the region, especially Ho Chi Minh City and the Southern Key Economic Zone.

Tiền Giang province has flat terrain with a slope below 1%, and the altitude varying from 0–1.6 metres (0.0–5.2 ft) in comparison with the sea level. The whole province area is in the lower section of Mekong River. Its current terrain surface and land was created by the accumulation of Mekong river silt during the development process of the modern delta in the marine regression period from the mid-Holocene (about 5,000 – 4,500 years to the present), which is also called new silt. In general, because the land surface is new silt which is rich in cat dirt and organic matters; the altitude of topography surface is relatively low. Its force-bearing ability for construction is not high. Therefore, ground leveling need to be done and construction projects need to be reinforced. Deep layers are fairly rich in sand and have better geological characteristics for construction. However, the arrangement of layers is very complex and some layers with bad geological characteristics for construction mingle with good ones. Therefore, it is necessary to carefully study them before the construction of large scale or heavy load, etc. is carried out. The whole region does not have a clear slope direction but there are several zones whose terrain is lower or higher than the general terrain.

=== Climate ===
Tiền Giang province is in the climate zone of Mekong Delta – the tropical monsoon climate zone whose temperature is high and stable all year round. It is clearly divided into two seasons: the rainy season is from May to November which is at the same time with Southwestern monsoon and the dry season is from December to April of the following year which is at the same time with Northeastern monsoon.

== Administrative divisions ==
Prior to July 2025, Tiền Giang was subdivided into 11 district-level sub-divisions:

- 8 districts:
  - Cái Bè
  - Cai Lậy
  - Châu Thành
  - Chợ Gạo
  - Gò Công Đông
  - Gò Công Tây
  - Tân Phú Đông
  - Tân Phước
- District-level towns:
  - Cai Lậy
- 1 provincial city:
  - Gò Công
  - Mỹ Tho (capital)

They are further subdivided into seven commune-level towns (or townlets), 144 communes and 22 wards.

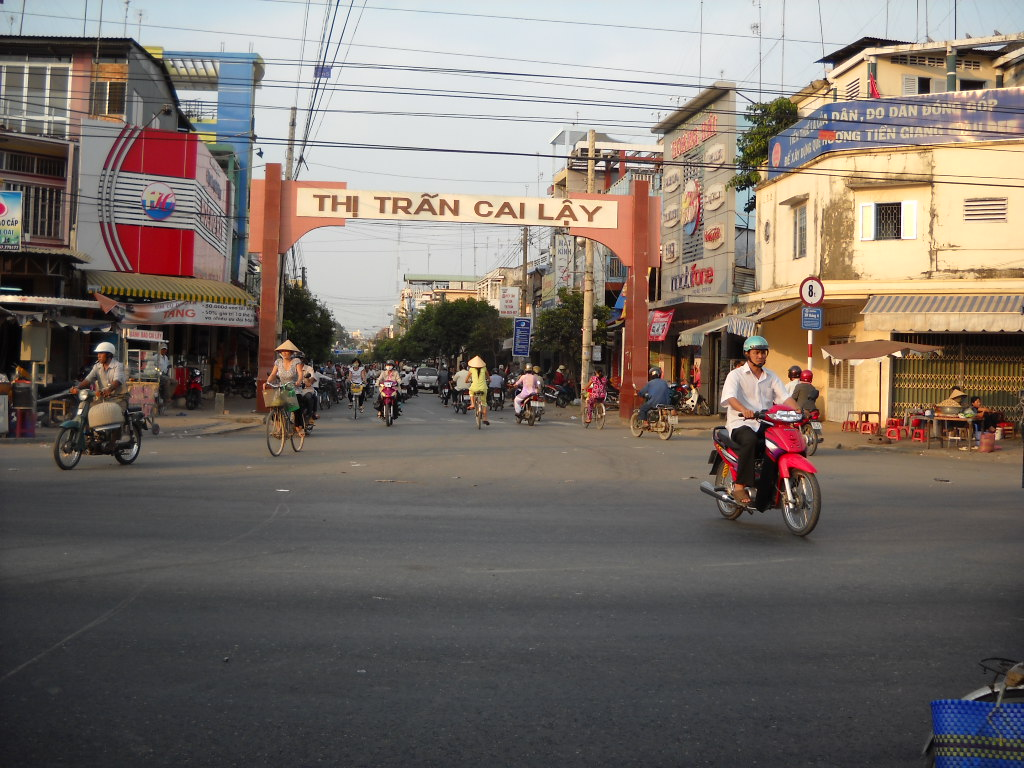
Cai Lậy Town

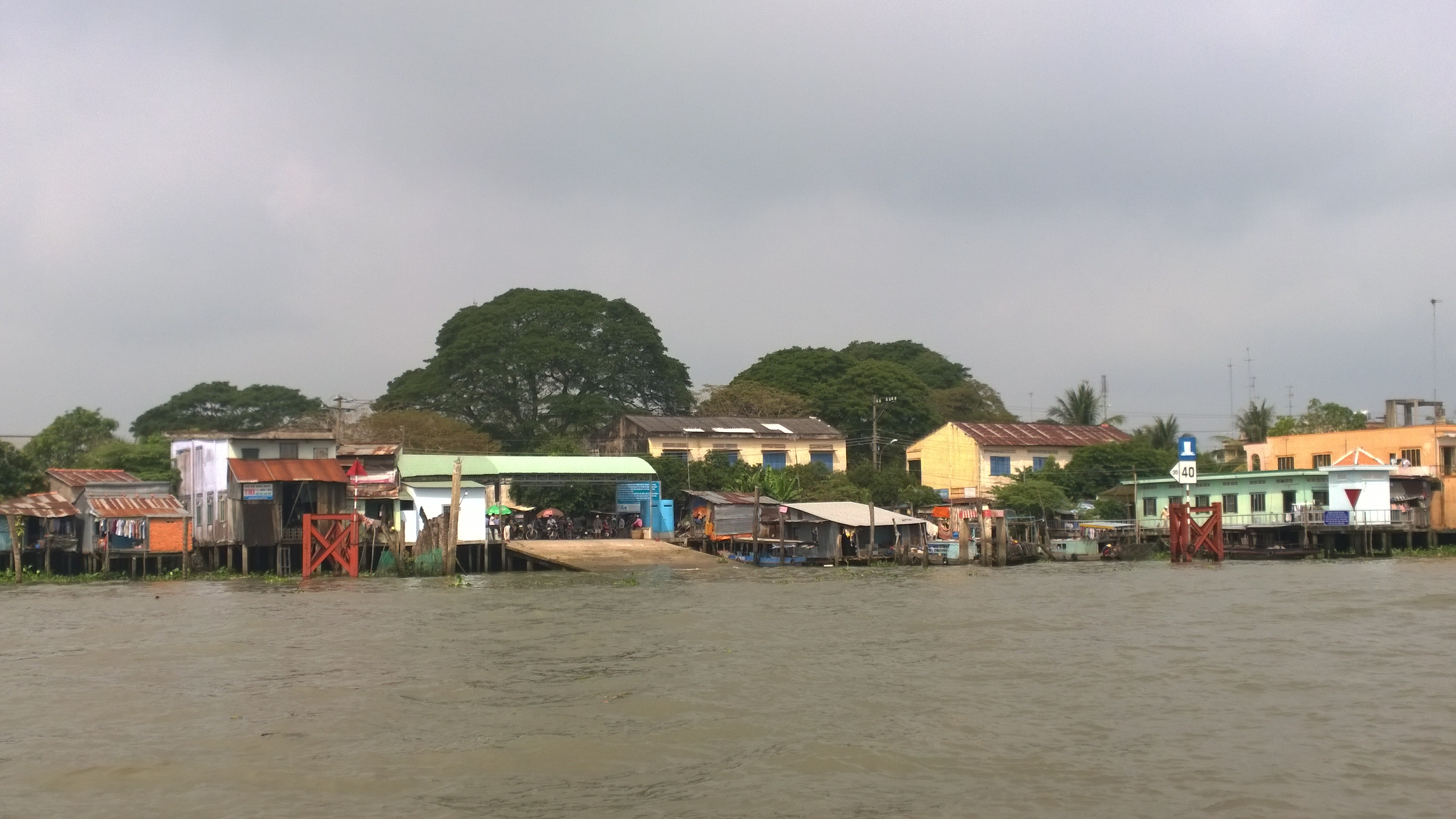
Cái Bè District

District-level sub-divisions	Mỹ Tho City	Gò Công City	Cai Lậy Town	Cái Bè District	Cai Lậy District	Châu Thành District	Chợ Gạo District	Gò Công Đông District	Gò Công Tây District	Tân Phú Đông District	Tân Phước District
Area (km^{2})	81.541	101.985	140.189	420.898	295.993	229.910	232.568	267.681	182.205	222.113	333.217
Population	282,000	107,600	123,775	291,627	242,757	234,423	186,803	142,797	131,252	42,926	57,561
Density (people/km^{2})	3,320	950	883	693	630	1,056	795	533	720	182	172
Administrative divisions	11 wards, 6 communes	5 wards, 7 communes	6 wards, 10 communes	1 townlet, 24 communes	16 communes	1 townlet, 22 communes	1 townlet, 18 communes	2 townlets, 11 communes	1 townlet, 12 communes	6 communes	1 townlet, 12 communes
Year of Establishment	1967	1987	2013	1912	1904	1912	1912	1979	1979	2008	1994
Source: Website of Tiền Giang Province

== Economy ==
If the Mekong Delta is dubbed Vietnam's fruit kingdom, Tiền Giang should be called “the kingdom of the fruits” since it has so many fruit brands such as Lò Rèn Vĩnh Kim star apple, Hòa Lộc mango and Tân Phước pineapple, Prime Minister Nguyễn Xuân Phúc said. It is up to the province's leadership and enterprises to make it possible for Tiền Giang to acquire geographical indications for fruits in the country and Southeast Asia, he said. The province has 73,000 ha of orchards, the largest in the country, which yield around 1.4 million tonnes of fruits a year. Besides hailing local authorities’ efforts to help enterprises overcome difficulties and achieve socioeconomic growth, the PM also instructed them to promptly address issues that could hinder development, such as speeding up land acquisition for businesses. The Government would always assist the province with infrastructure development to help it achieve its socioeconomic targets and guarantee that the legal rights of enterprises and investors in the province are protected, Nguyễn Xuân Phúc said.

Secretary of the provincial Party Committee Nguyễn Văn Danh said the locality will pay attention to marine economic development based on green growth and biodiversity conservation. The province will focus on restructuring the marine economy, developing science-technology and marine human resources, protecting the environment and coping with climate change and rising sea levels, Danh, who is also Chairman of the provincial People's Council said. It aims to reduce the number of inshore fishing vessels by 30 percent and establish a chain of connectivity from supplying materials to transportation of products, processing and sales. In addition, it will develop brackish water aquaculture by applying environmentally friendly technology.

According to Tiền Giang Industry and Trade Sector, the goal for 2016 is to focus on attracting investment by creating the favorable conditions for implementing well investment projects, and effectively employing existing facilities network of the sector. In addition, more efforts will be put on supporting and creating favorable condition as well as promptly alleviating difficulties for enterprises to boost provincial production and business. Alongside, restructure of the industry sector should be well done, focusing on developing industrial products with a competitive advantage, supporting industry, high technology industry and industrial products served for the development of agriculture and rural areas.

== Tourism ==
The Mekong Delta province of Tiền Giang has divided itself into three economic zones to create spillover effects on the tourism sector, said the province's chairman, Le Van Huong, at the Culture, Sports and Tourism Festival 2019 there on January 11. In the western region of the province, the outlying district of Cái Bè has been regarded as a driving force, thanks to its Đông Hòa Hiệp ancient village festival. The central urban economic zone, according to Huong, is aimed at raising the quality of tourism services in Thới Sơn Islet of Mỹ Tho City, together with the development of a pedestrian area along the Tiền River, and a night food market. Afterwards, the development of tourism in Tân Thành Beach of Gò Công Đông District will be associated with cultural relics in Gò Công Town and Ngang Islet of Tân Phú Đông District, along with improvements in Truong Dinh Temple. The aim is to form a festival center of the zone. In 2019, the province targets 2.1 million tourists, including 850,000 foreigners, and 1.14 trillion VND in tourism revenue.

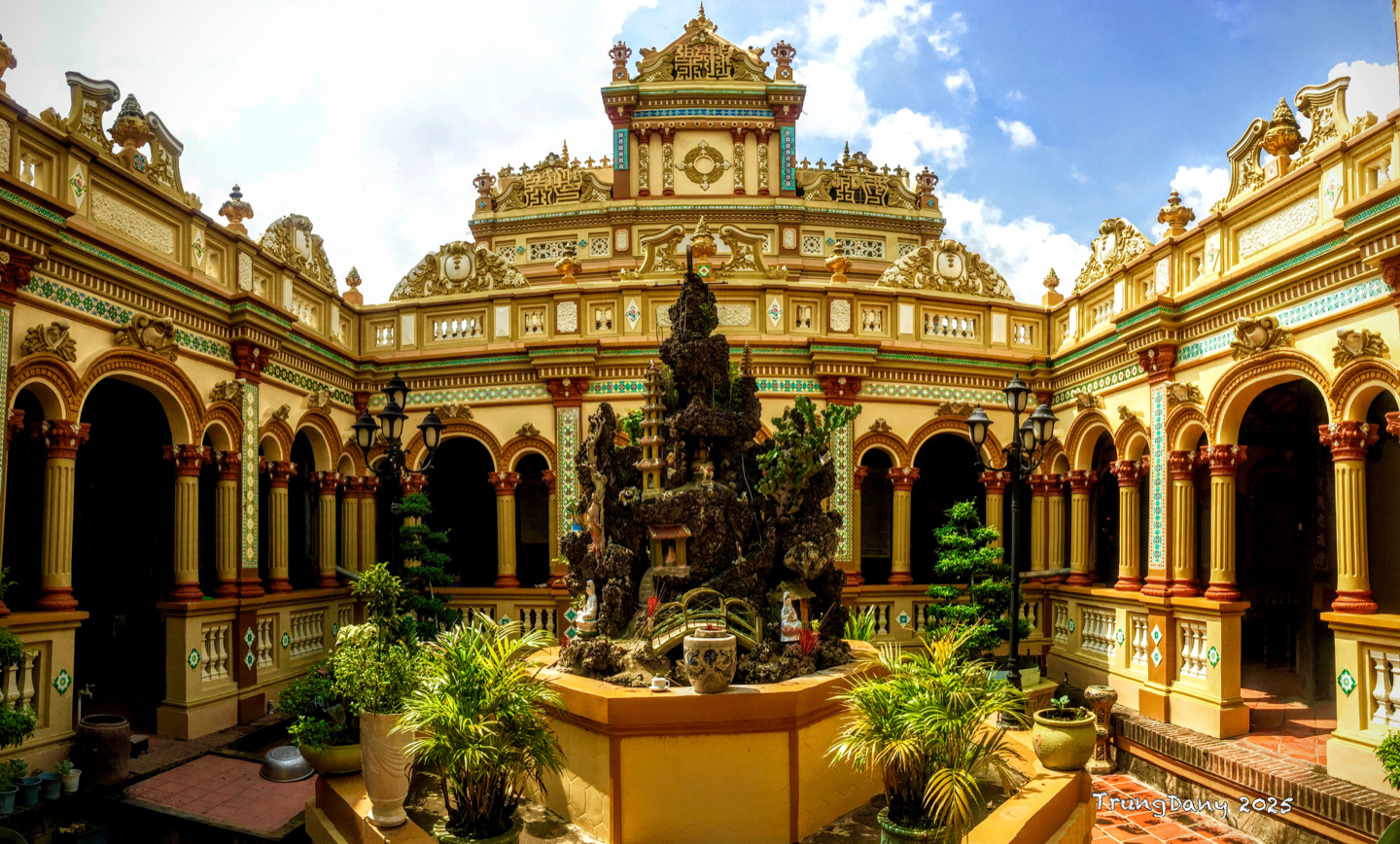
Vinh Trang temple

According to VnExpress, there are four unmissable places to visit in Tiền Giang province:

- Cái Bè Floating market

The market is located in the area where the Tiền River borders three provinces: Tiền Giang, Vĩnh Long and Bến Tre.

- Dong Tam Snake Farm

The snake farm is in Bình Đức Commune, Châu Thành District, and is located about 9 kilometres (5.6 mi) west of Mỹ Tho City.

- Vinh Trang temple

This is the largest Buddhist site in the province, built in the 19th century, and covering an area of two hectares with many large Buddha statues and beautiful gardens. The unique architecture of the temple is a combination of both Asian and European styles.

- Thoi Son Island

The 1,200 hectare island is located in the lower section of the Tiền River. It has been a popular eco-tourism site since the 1990s. Today, it welcomes hundreds of tourists and visitors every day. The paths through the island is lined with fruit trees, including plums, nipa palms and mangoes.

== Notable people from Tiền Giang ==
1. Empress Dowager Từ Dụ (1810–1902), mother of the Nguyễn dynasty's Emperor Tự Đức.
2. Empress Nam Phương (1914–1963), consort of Emperor Bảo Đại, the second and last empress consort of the Nguyễn dynasty.
3. Nguyễn Hữu Huân (1830–1975), a scholar and leader of an anti-French colonialist movement in Cochinchina.
4. Nguyễn Thị Thập (1908–1996), Deputy Chairwoman of the National Assembly of Vietnam (1960–75), and Chairwoman of the Women's Federation of Vietnam (1956–74).
5. Trương Mỹ Hoa (1945-), Vice President of Vietnam (2002–07), Deputy Chairwoman of the National Assembly of Vietnam (1997–2002), Chairwoman of the Women's Federation of Vietnam (1992–98).
6. Lê Thanh Hải (1950-), former member of the Politburo of the Communist Party of Vietnam, Secretary of the Ho Chi Minh City's Communist Party Committee (2006-date).
7. Nguyen Minh Phong, Vietnam's Next Top Model (cycle 7) top five alumnus.
8. Phương Dung (1946-), Vietnamese country singer
9. Trần Văn Khê (1921-2015), Vietnamese musicologist, academic, writer, teacher and performer of traditional music.
