= Thới Sơn, Đồng Tháp =

Thới Sơn Phường Thới Sơn Cồn Lân
- Ward
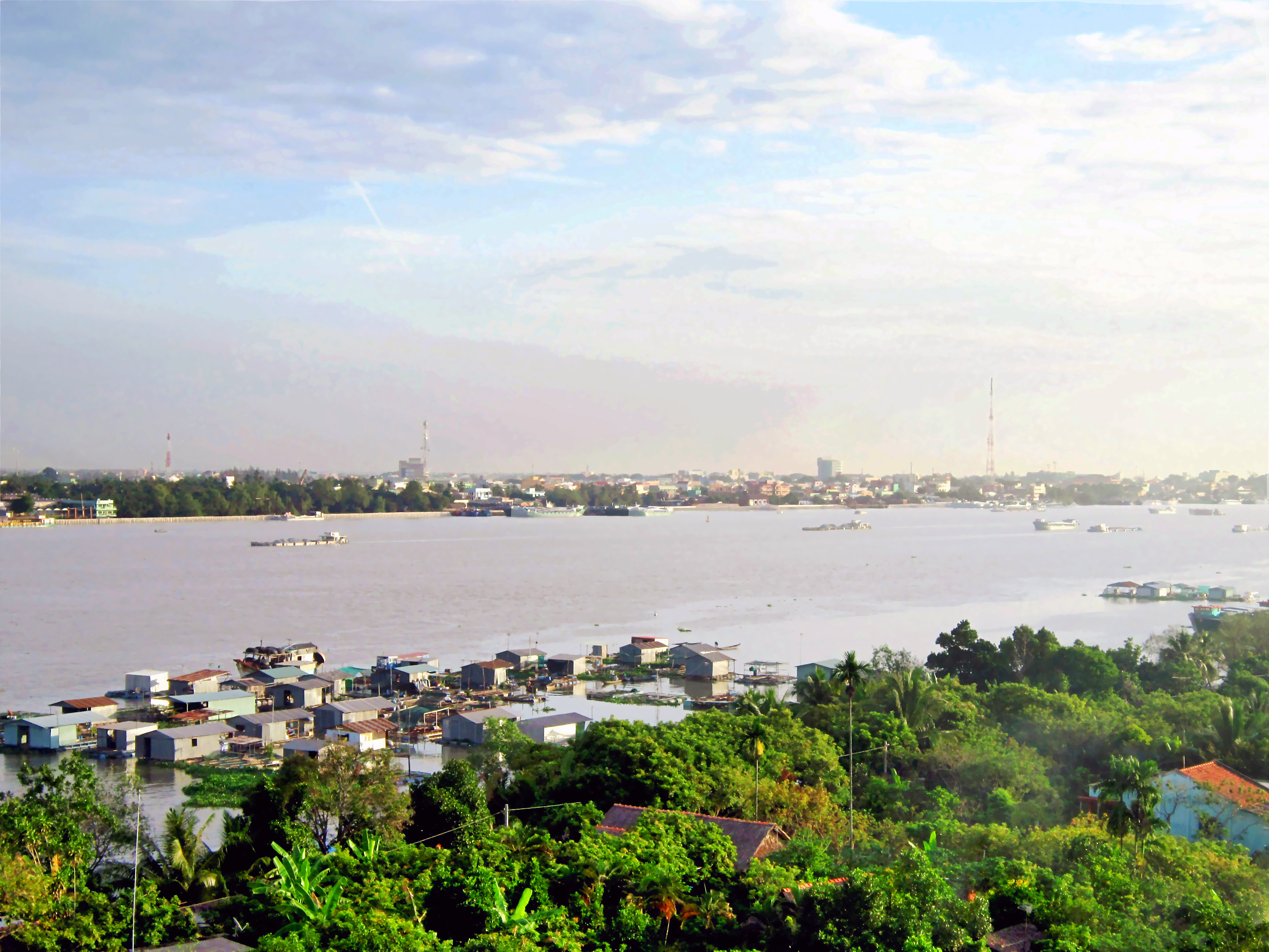
- A view of Thới Sơn island from Rạch Miễu Bridge.
- Interactive map of Thới Sơn
- Country: Vietnam
- Province: Đồng Tháp
- Establish: June 16, 2025
- Headquarters of the People's Committee: 329/2, Nguyễn Thị Thập street, Thới Sơn ward

Area
  - Total: 15.2 km^{2} (5.9 sq mi)

Population (2025)
  - Total: 38,490 people
  - Density: 2,530/km^{2} (6,560/sq mi)
- Time zone: UTC+07:00
- Administrative: 28270

Thới Sơn is a ward in Đồng Tháp province, Vietnam. This is one of 102 communes and wards in the province after the 2025 reorganization.

== Geography ==
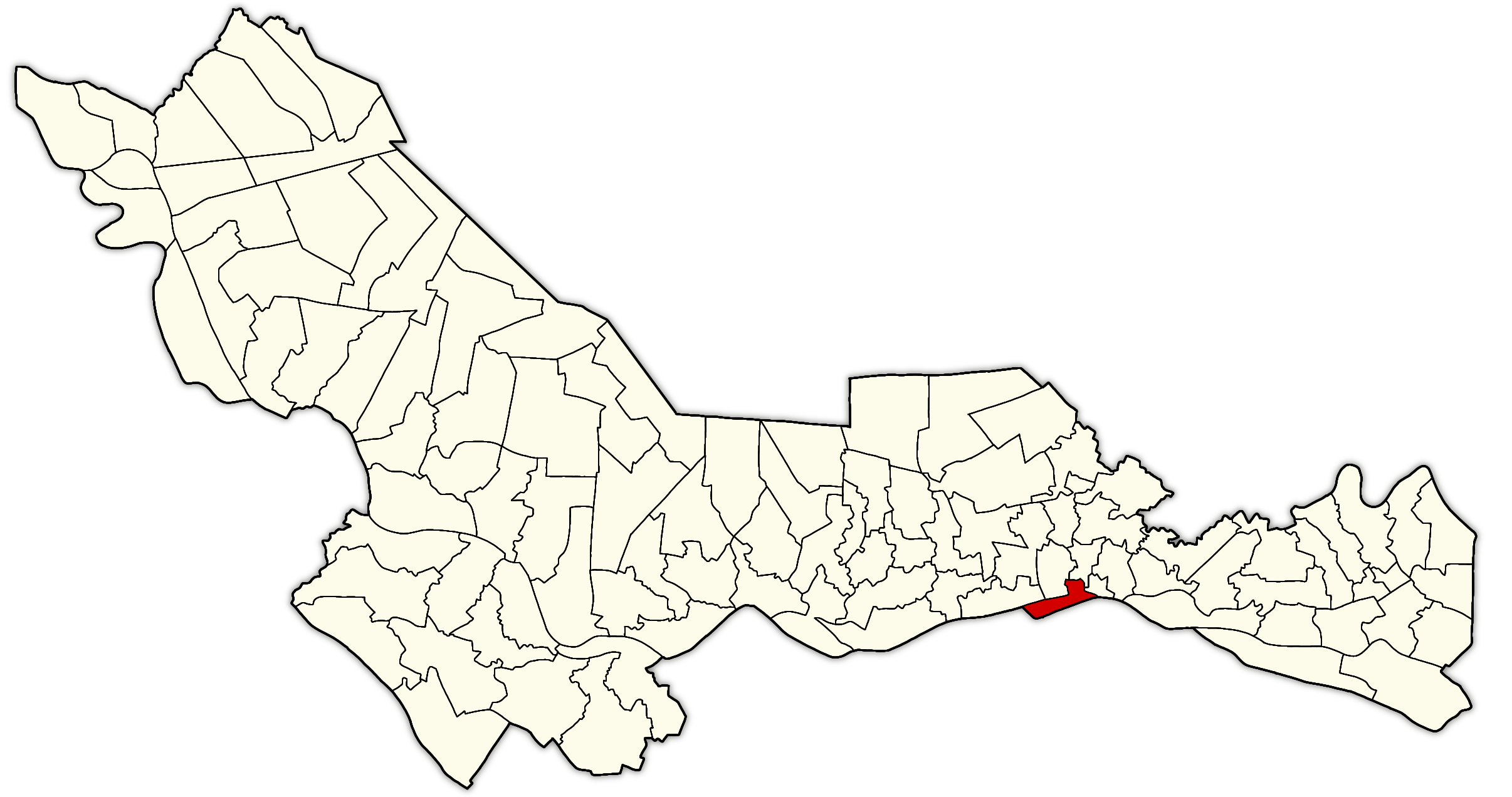
Location of Thới Sơn ward in Đồng Tháp province map (highlight in red).

Thới Sơn is a ward located in the eastern part of Đồng Tháp province, 100km east of Cao Lãnh ward and 35km west of Gò Công ward. The ward has the following geographical location:

- To the south, it borders Phú Túc, Vĩnh Long by Tiền River
- To the east, it borders Mỹ Tho ward by Mỹ Tho River and Đạo Thạnh ward by Trần Hưng Đạo Street
- To the north, it borders Đạo Thạnh ward by streets of Lê Văn Phẩm and Lý Thường Kiệt
- To the west, it borders Trung An ward and Kim Sơn commune by Mỹ Tho River.

== Administrative divisions ==
Thới Sơn ward is divided into 17 quarters: 1, 2, 3, 4, 5, 6, 7, 8, 9, 10, 11, 12, Mỹ Thạnh Hưng, Thới Bình, Thới Hòa, Thới Thạnh, Thới Thuận.

== History ==
Prior to 2025, Thới Sơn ward was formerly ward 6 and Thới Sơn islandic commune of Mỹ Tho City, Tiền Giang province.

On June 12, 2025, the 15th National Assembly of Vietnam issued Resolution No. 202/2025/QH15 on the reorganization of provincial-level administrative units. Accordingly, new Đồng Tháp province was established by merging the entire area and population of Đồng Tháp province and Tiền Giang province (Excerpt from Clause 21, Article 1).

On June 16 of the same year, the Standing Committee of the Vietnamese National Assembly issued Resolution No. 1663/NQ-UBTVQH15 on the reorganization of commune-level administrative units in Dong Thap province. Accordingly, Thới Sơn ward was established by merging the entire area and population of Ward 6 and Thới Sơn commune (formerly part of Mỹ Tho city; excerpt from Clause 86, Article 1).
