= Mỹ Tho =

Mỹ Tho is a place name in southern Vietnam. This name has been given to many administrative units throughout history. Currently, Mỹ Tho is a ward in Đồng Tháp province of Vietnam, and may also refer to:

- Mỹ Tho (ward), ward in Đồng Tháp province
- Mỹ Tho (city), provincial city of Tiền Giang province
- Mỹ Tho province, historical province of Vietnam
- Mỹ Tho River, river in the Mekong Delta
