= Mỹ Tho (city) =

Former provincial city and capital of the former Tiền Giang province, Vietnam

Mỹ Tho Thành phố Mỹ Tho
- Provincial city (Class-1)
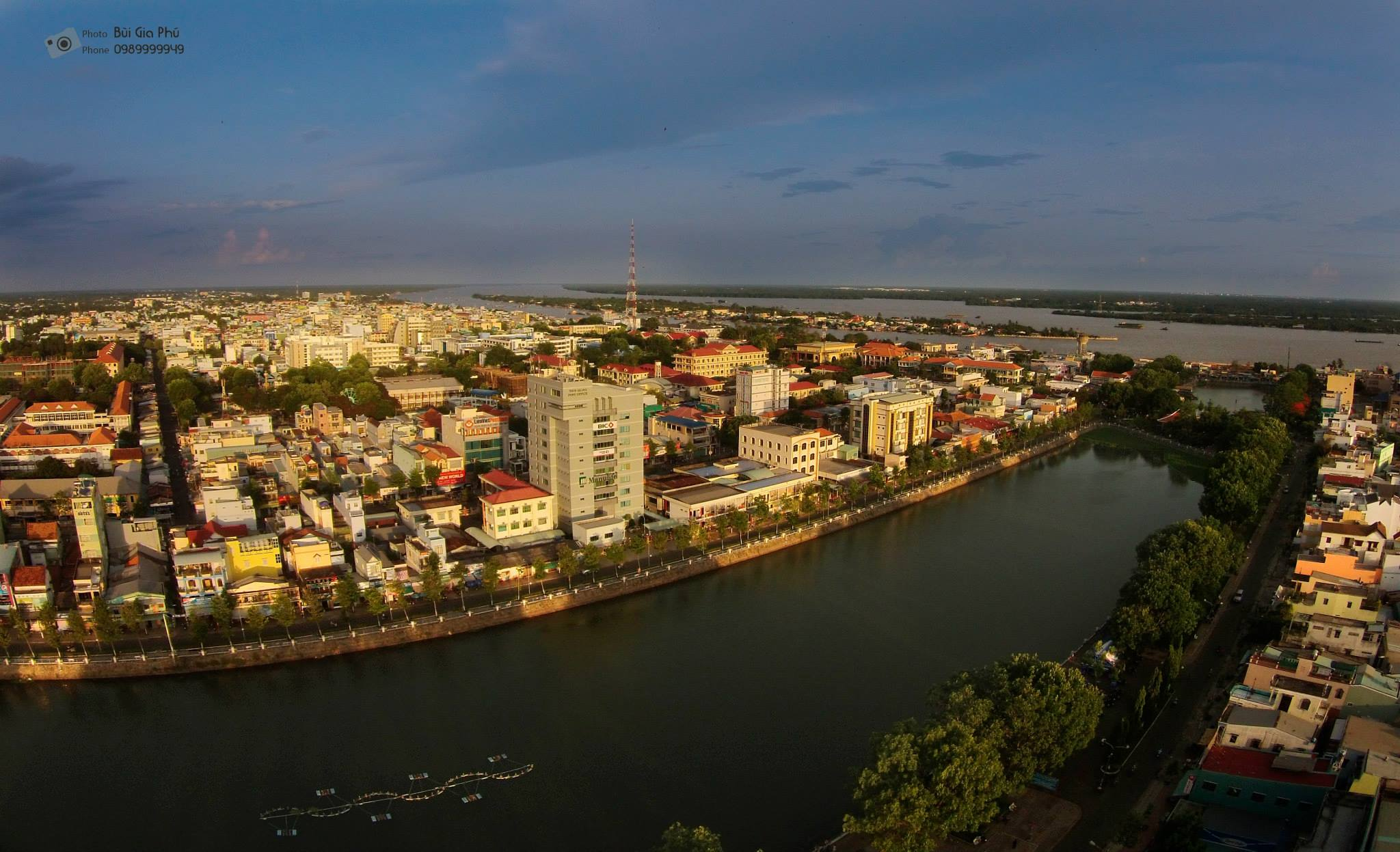
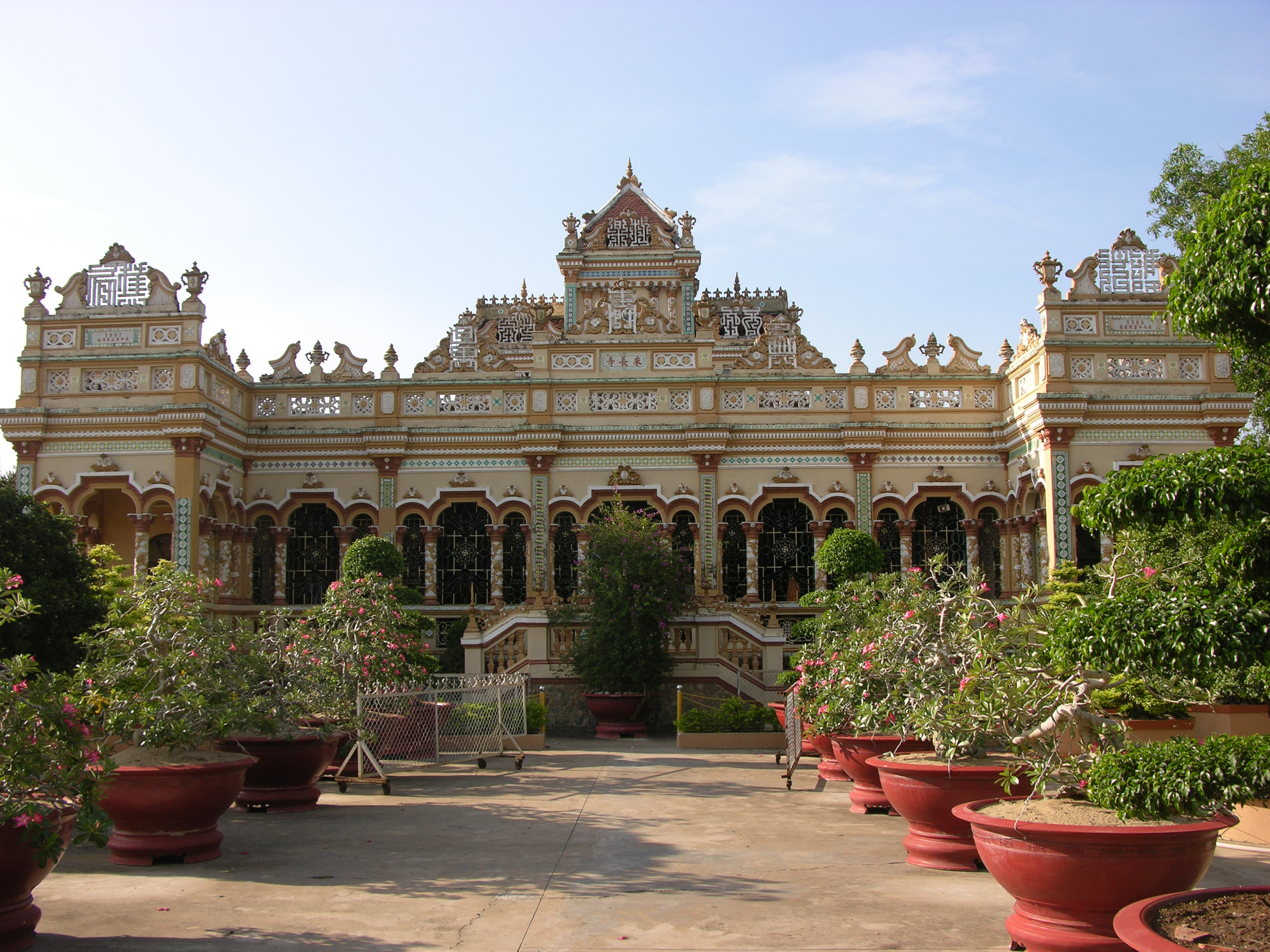
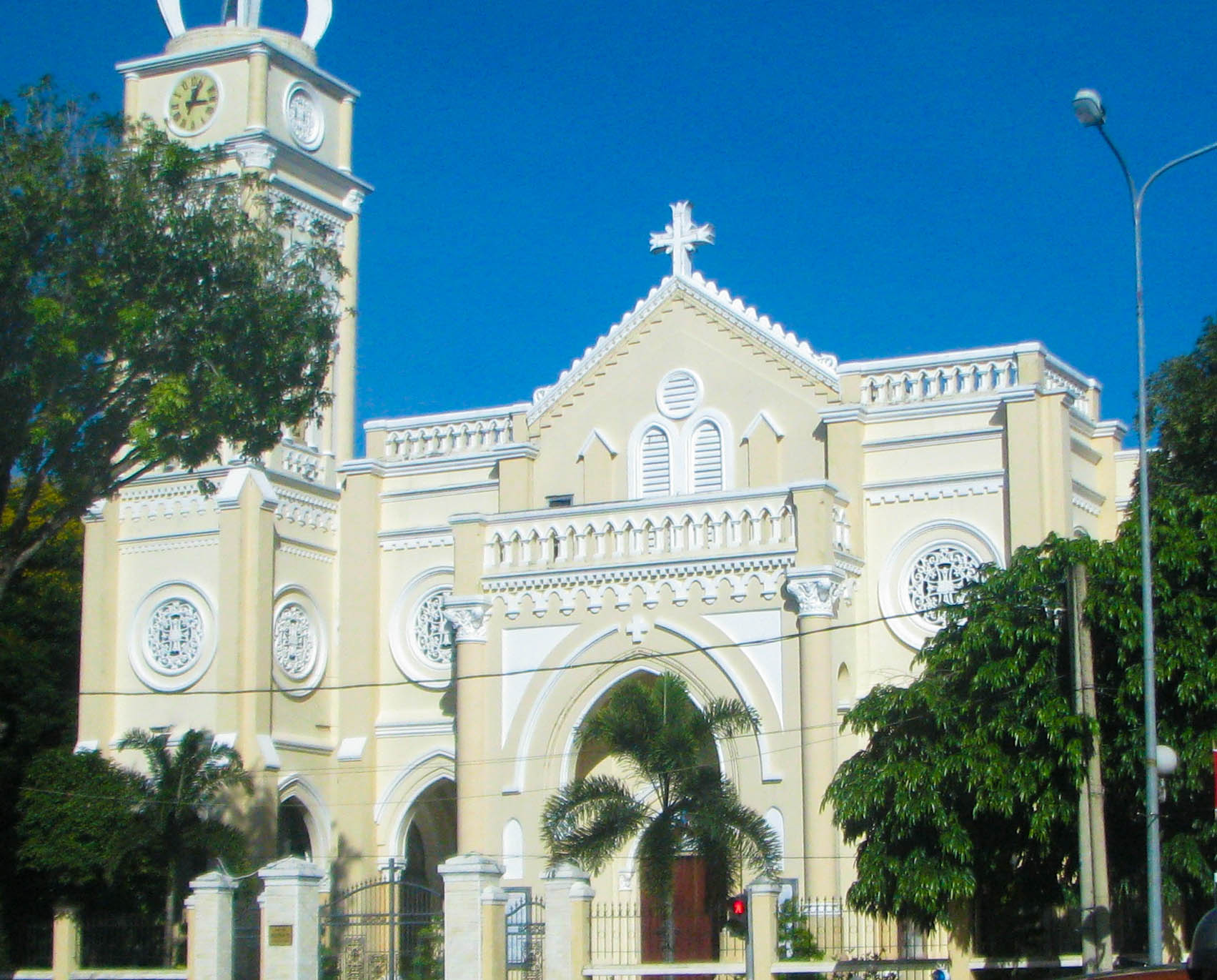
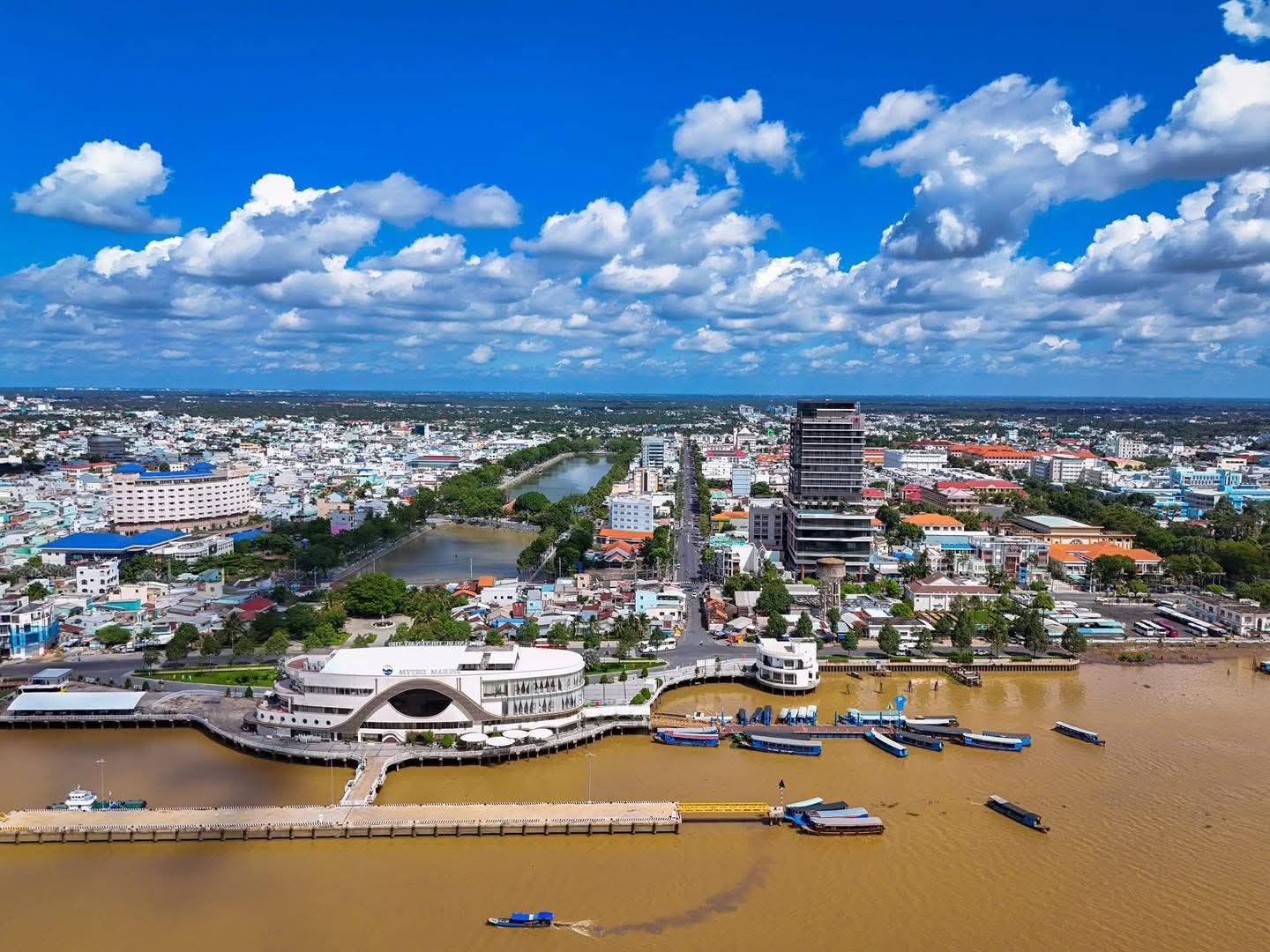
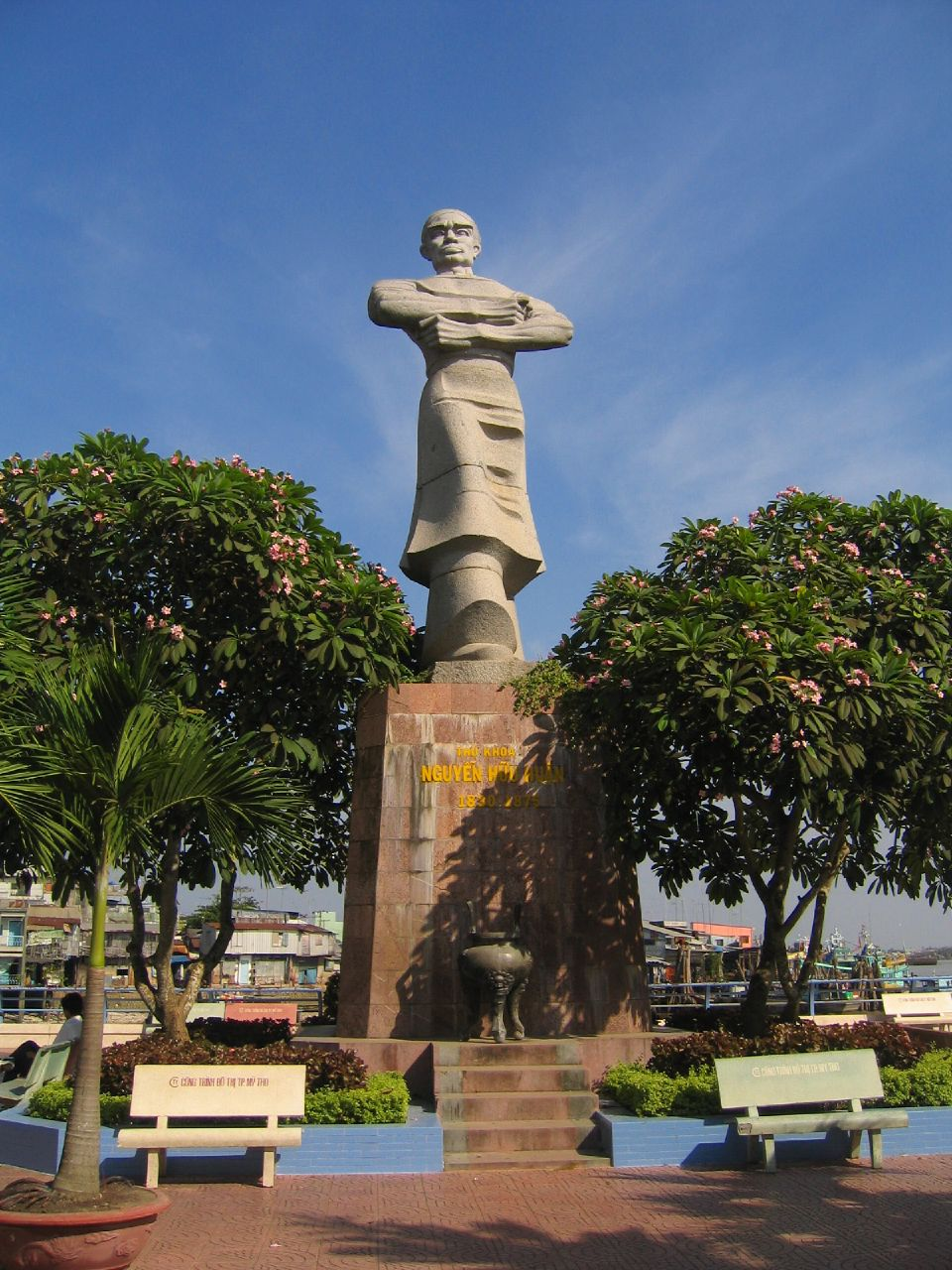
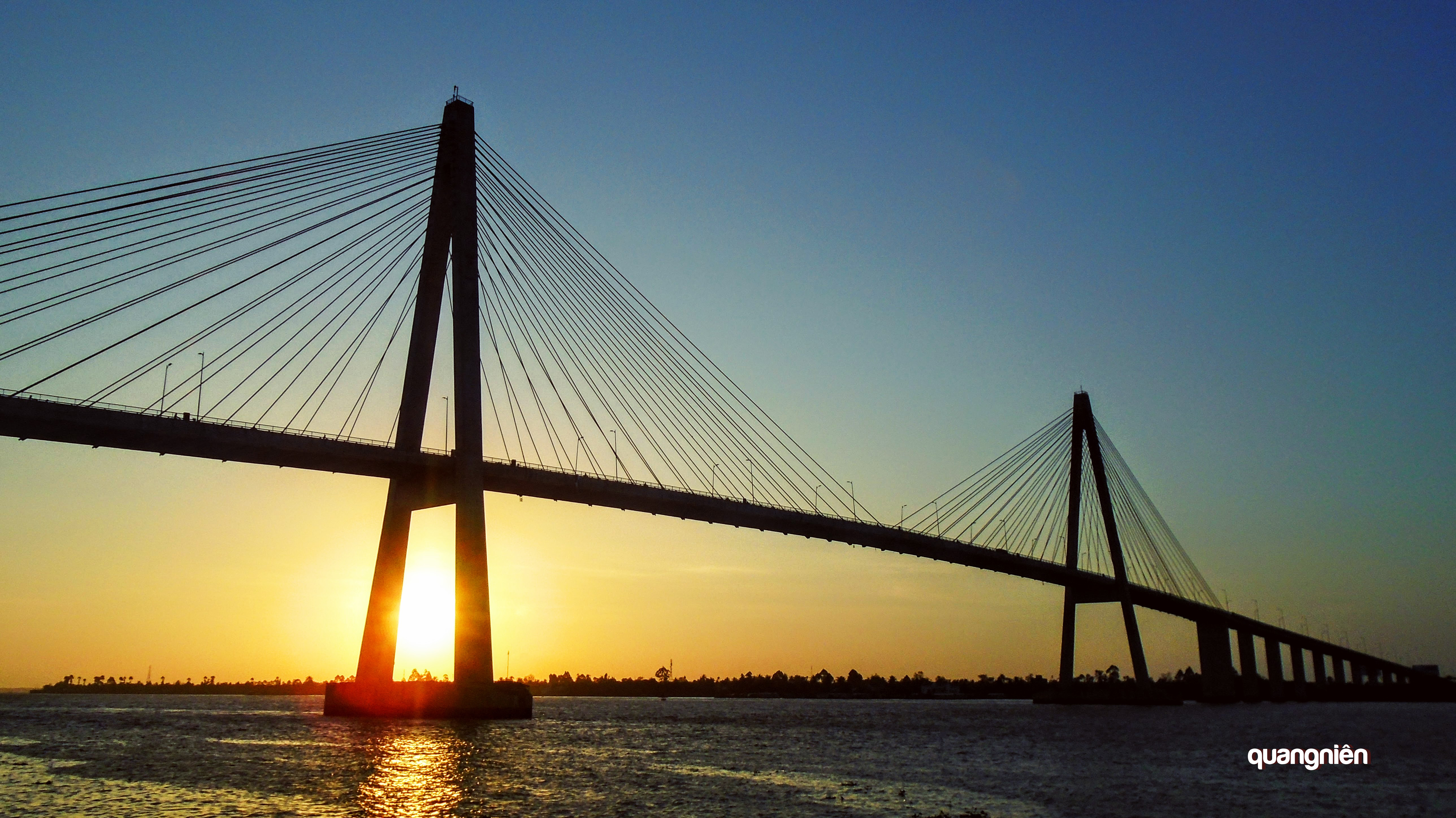
- Mỹ Tho well in downtown Vĩnh Tràng Temple Cathedral Mỹ Tho Mỹ Tho riverfront with Mỹ Tho Marina in downtown Thủ Khoa Huân statue Rạch Miễu Bridge

- Seal
- Nickname(s): The first and oldest town of Southern Vietnam (Đô thị đầu tiên và lâu đời nhất của vùng Nam Bộ)
- Interactive map of Mỹ Tho
- Location in Vietnam
- Coordinates: 10°21′29″N 106°21′51″E
- Country: Vietnam
- Province: Tiền Giang
- Region: Mekong Delta
- Metro: Ho Chi Minh City metropolitan area
- Dissolution: 1st July 2025

Area
  - Total: 81.55 km^{2} (31.49 sq mi)

Population (2019)
  - Total: 270,700
  - Density: 3,319/km^{2} (8,597/sq mi)
- Area codes: 073, 074 (nation) and +8473,+8474 (international)
- Climate: Aw
- Website: mytho.tiengiang.gov.vn

Mỹ Tho is a former provincial city in the Tiền Giang province in the Mekong Delta region of Vietnam. It has a population of approximately 169,000 in 2006 and 220,000 in 2012. It is the regional center of economics, education and technology. The majority ethnic group is the Kinh; minority groups include the Hoa, the Cham and the Khmer people. Boat rides on the Mỹ Tho River are popular with tourists, and the city is known for hủ tiếu Mỹ Tho, a type of rice noodles soup.

Mỹ Tho ceased to exist as a municipal city on 1 July 2025, following the elimination of district level units in Vietnam. It is now divided into wards of: Mỹ Tho, Mỹ Phong, Đạo Thạnh, Trung An and Thới Sơn, Đồng Tháp. The same name ward covers most of the historic city center area.

== History ==
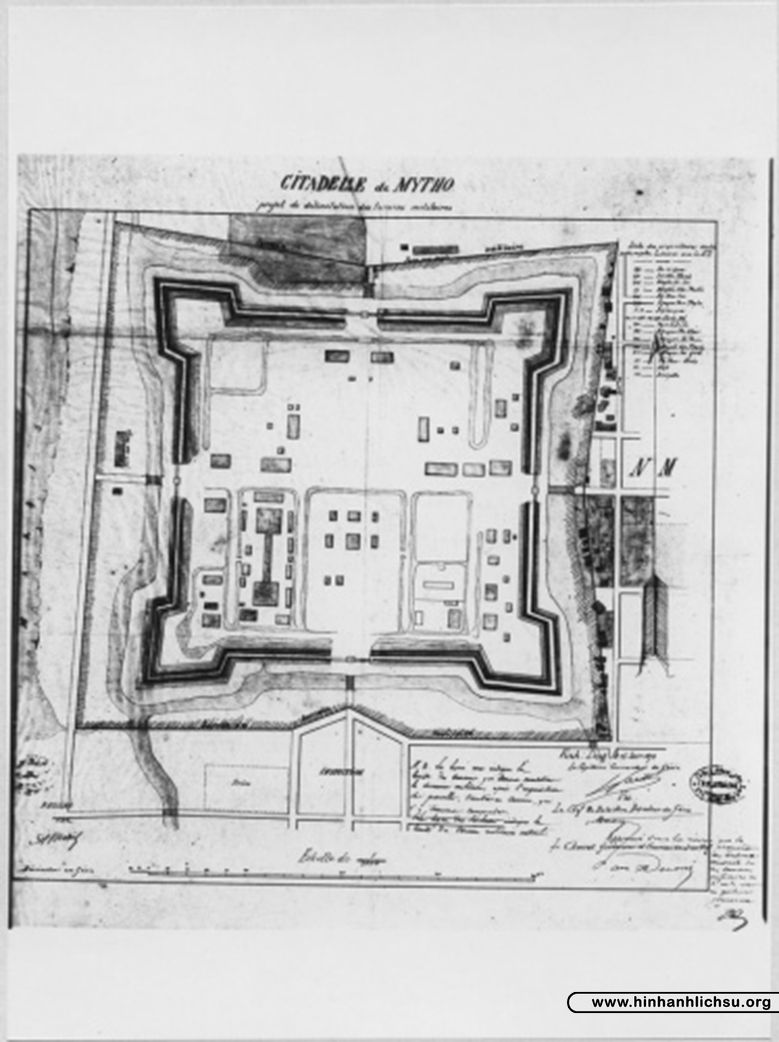
Drawing of Mỹ Tho Citadel in 1873

Mỹ Tho was founded in the 1680s by Chinese refugees fleeing China after the fall of remnants of the Southern Ming to the Qing dynasty in 1683. The city is named after the Mỹ Tho River. In chữ Hán, the name is given as 美萩 (literally, beautiful tree).

Due to its proximity to Saigon, Mỹ Tho was the traditional gateway to the Mekong Delta. In the 17th century, the city had become one of the biggest commercial hubs in today's Southern Vietnam.

In the 1860s, Mỹ Tho, along with Saigon, was a major strategic city during the French colonial campaign towards Vietnam. In 1862, France's capture of Mỹ Tho is regarded as the conclusion to the establishment of the French colony of Cochinchina, a development that inaugurated nearly a century of French colonial dominance in Vietnam. During the colonization period, the economy continued to prosper, attracting more immigrants, mainly from Teochew and Minnan of mainland China.

Mỹ Tho City was recognized as a grade II on 7 October 2005.

== Administrative divisions ==
As of July 2025, the City of Mỹ Tho was divided to 11 wards (phường): numerical from 1 to 10, and Tân Long with 6 communes (xã) are:

- Đạo Thạnh
- Mỹ Phong
- Phước Thạnh
- Tân Mỹ Chánh
- Thới Sơn
- Trung An

== Transportation ==
Tiền Giang province transportation map

Mỹ Tho is connected to the rest of the country by National Route 1, North–South Expressway East and Tiền River. Here, people mainly use motorcycles, bicycles, and boats for transportation. Mỹ Tho has the first railway route (about 70 kilometres (43 mi) long) in Vietnam which was one of the most modern transport means in the world linking Saigon and Mỹ Tho, put into use in 1885. However, it was destroyed in the 1960s during Vietnam War.

By road, Mỹ Tho City is 70 kilometres (43 mi) from the anonymous capital city of Vĩnh Long province, 70 kilometres (43 mi) from Ho Chi Minh City, regional center of Southern Vietnam, 103 kilometres (64 mi) from Cần Thơ, 179 kilometres (111 mi) from Châu Đốc, 182 kilometres (113 mi) from Rạch Giá, 132 kilometres (82 mi) from Long Xuyên. Mỹ Tho and Bến Tre are connected by Rạch Miễu Bridge on National Route 60.

By river, there are many short boat trips to various islands, Bến Tre, and floating markets in the surrounding areas. It also has overnight long boats to Châu Đốc and Long Xuyên.

By air travel, the nearest domestic and international airport is Ho Chi Minh City metropolitan area's Tan Son Nhat International Airport, which is located 71 km north east of Mỹ Tho via National Route 1 or Ho Chi Minh City–Trung Luong Expressway. Another major airport in the metropolitan area is Long Thanh International Airport which is about 100 km to the north east, via the Ho Chi Minh City–Trung Luong Expressway and Ben Luc – Long Thanh Expressway.

== Climate ==
Climate data for Mỹ Tho
Month	Jan	Feb	Mar	Apr	May	Jun	Jul	Aug	Sep	Oct	Nov	Dec	Year
Record high °C (°F)	34.8 (94.6)	35.1 (95.2)	36.8 (98.2)	38.2 (100.8)	38.9 (102.0)	36.6 (97.9)	36.5 (97.7)	35.8 (96.4)	36.8 (98.2)	35.5 (95.9)	36.2 (97.2)	34.5 (94.1)	38.9 (102.0)
Mean daily maximum °C (°F)	30.2 (86.4)	30.9 (87.6)	32.2 (90.0)	33.6 (92.5)	33.3 (91.9)	32.2 (90.0)	31.7 (89.1)	31.5 (88.7)	31.3 (88.3)	30.9 (87.6)	30.8 (87.4)	30.2 (86.4)	31.6 (88.9)
Daily mean °C (°F)	25.5 (77.9)	26.1 (79.0)	27.3 (81.1)	28.6 (83.5)	28.4 (83.1)	27.7 (81.9)	27.3 (81.1)	27.1 (80.8)	27.0 (80.6)	26.8 (80.2)	26.7 (80.1)	25.8 (78.4)	27.1 (80.8)
Mean daily minimum °C (°F)	22.2 (72.0)	22.8 (73.0)	24.2 (75.6)	25.4 (77.7)	25.6 (78.1)	25.0 (77.0)	24.6 (76.3)	24.6 (76.3)	24.6 (76.3)	24.3 (75.7)	23.8 (74.8)	22.6 (72.7)	24.1 (75.4)
Record low °C (°F)	14.9 (58.8)	15.9 (60.6)	15.7 (60.3)	19.4 (66.9)	21.5 (70.7)	21.2 (70.2)	19.6 (67.3)	21.2 (70.2)	21.2 (70.2)	19.9 (67.8)	17.6 (63.7)	16.1 (61.0)	14.9 (58.8)
Average rainfall mm (inches)	8.1 (0.32)	1.8 (0.07)	6.6 (0.26)	41.3 (1.63)	149.7 (5.89)	203.2 (8.00)	189.2 (7.45)	192.6 (7.58)	231.3 (9.11)	263.7 (10.38)	95.4 (3.76)	35.6 (1.40)	1,419.7 (55.89)
Average rainy days	1.6	0.6	1.3	4.4	14.9	18.7	20.0	20.2	20.3	19.6	10.5	5.8	137.5
Average relative humidity (%)	79.2	78.4	78.4	78.0	81.4	83.1	83.7	84.3	85.0	85.3	83.2	81.4	82.2
Mean monthly sunshine hours	244.1	249.3	284.9	261.5	209.8	180.7	188.5	187.9	165.4	170.5	198.5	198.0	2,531.1
Source: Vietnam Institute for Building Science and Technology

== Tourism ==
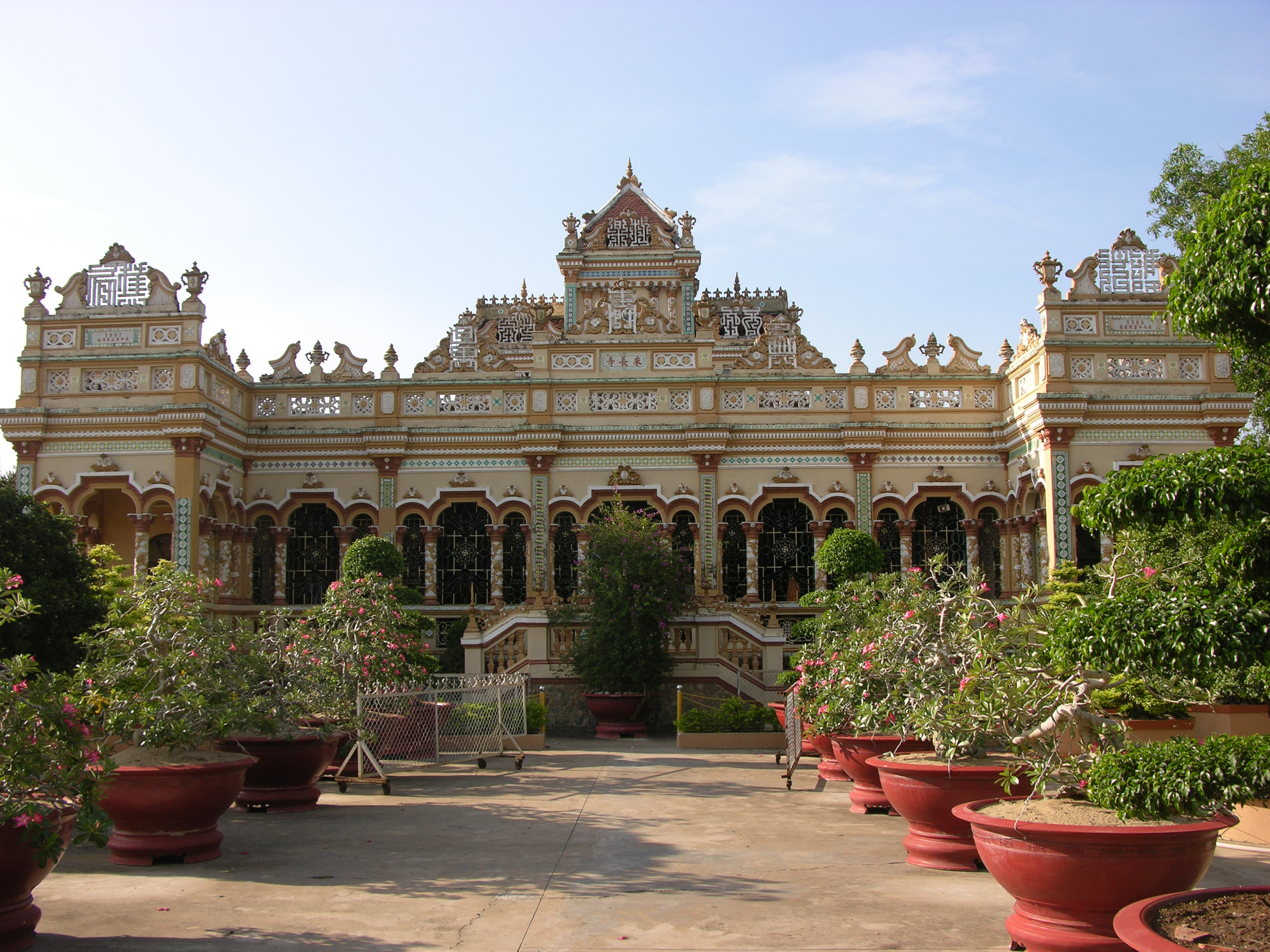
Front view of Vĩnh Tràng Temple

Some of the most attracted sights in the city are: Vĩnh Tràng Temple, Cao Dai Temple, Đồng Tâm Snake Farm.

There are four islands on the Tiền River between Mỹ Tho and Bến Tre: Dragon (Cồn Rồng), Unicorn (Cồn Lân), Tortoise (Cồn Qui) and Phoenix (Cồn Phụng) Islands with the first two are part of Mỹ Tho and the rest are Bến Tre; those were named after the mythology of Four Holy Beasts. Those are well known for the eco tour on them.

The Mekong Delta is considered to be the "rice basket of Vietnam", contributing more than half of the nation's rice production. Mỹ Tho is well known as floating markets, where people sell and buy things on the river, as well as Bến Tắm Ngựa (lit. 'Horse-bathing spot') and Mỹ Thuận market.

== Education ==
Mỹ Tho was the second town in southern Vietnam to have a high school, after the Collège Chasseloup-Laubat, Saigon opened in 1874 (now Lê Quý Đôn High School, Ho Chi Minh City). The Collège de Mỹ Tho, opened in March 1879, now is Nguyễn Đình Chiểu High School [vi], it is the most prestigious school in the city in particular and the province in general.

Schools in Mỹ Tho are named after famous Vietnamese writers, poets, and national heroes such as Nguyễn Trãi, Nguyễn Hữu Huân (or Thủ Khoa Huân), Xuân Diệu, Lê Ngọc Hân, Nguyễn Đình Chiểu, Trần Hưng Đạo.

Tiền Giang College which was promoted to Tiền Giang University in 2005 is also located at Mỹ Tho.

== Economy ==
Today the economy of Mỹ Tho is mainly based on tourism, fishing, and agricultural products such as coconuts, bananas, and longans.

During World War II the French Vichy government interned foreign nationals in Mỹ Tho. In May 1945, the Japanese seized control of the camps fearing an allied attack. Foreign nationals were confined throughout the war. As the regional capital, Mỹ Tho is the main market dealing in all the produce from the region as well as fish and other seafood from Mỹ Tho's large ocean-going fishing fleet. The very large and exuberant market is one of South Vietnam's biggest sources for dried fish and other dried seafood products such as Kho Muc (dried squid). At night the market is dedicated to the dealing and sorting of Mekong River fish, particularly catfish for Hồ Chí Minh City's wholesale markets. Produce, especially fruit and vegetables, is delivered by boat directly to markets. It is a popular starting point for tourists to take a boat trip on the Mekong River.

Mỹ Tho was the subject of "The Lesson", a chapter in a memoir by Tobias Wolff, In Pharaoh's Army: Memories of the Lost War, describing the events of the 1968 Tet Offensive there.

In 2010, there are total 17 markets located in wards and commune in Mỹ Tho.

== Neighbouring cities ==
=== Inside the city ===
- West and North: Chợ Gạo District
- East: Châu Thành District, Tiền Giang
- South: Tiền River and Bến Tre province

=== Outside the city ===
- Nam Định City, Nam Định province

== Notable people ==
- Nguyễn Thị Thập - Chairman of the Women's Federation of Vietnam (Hội liên hiệp phụ nữ Việt Nam) from 1956 to 1974
- General Nguyễn Khánh - former Prime Minister, General, and Ambassador of South Vietnam
- General Nguyễn Hữu Hạnh - served in the Army of the Republic of Vietnam
- Madame Thiệu, the last serving First Lady of South Vietnam from 1967 to 1975 and wife of the President of South Vietnam Nguyễn Văn Thiệu
- Trần Anh Hùng – an Academy Awards nominated French-Vietnamese film director and screenwriter

== Gallery ==
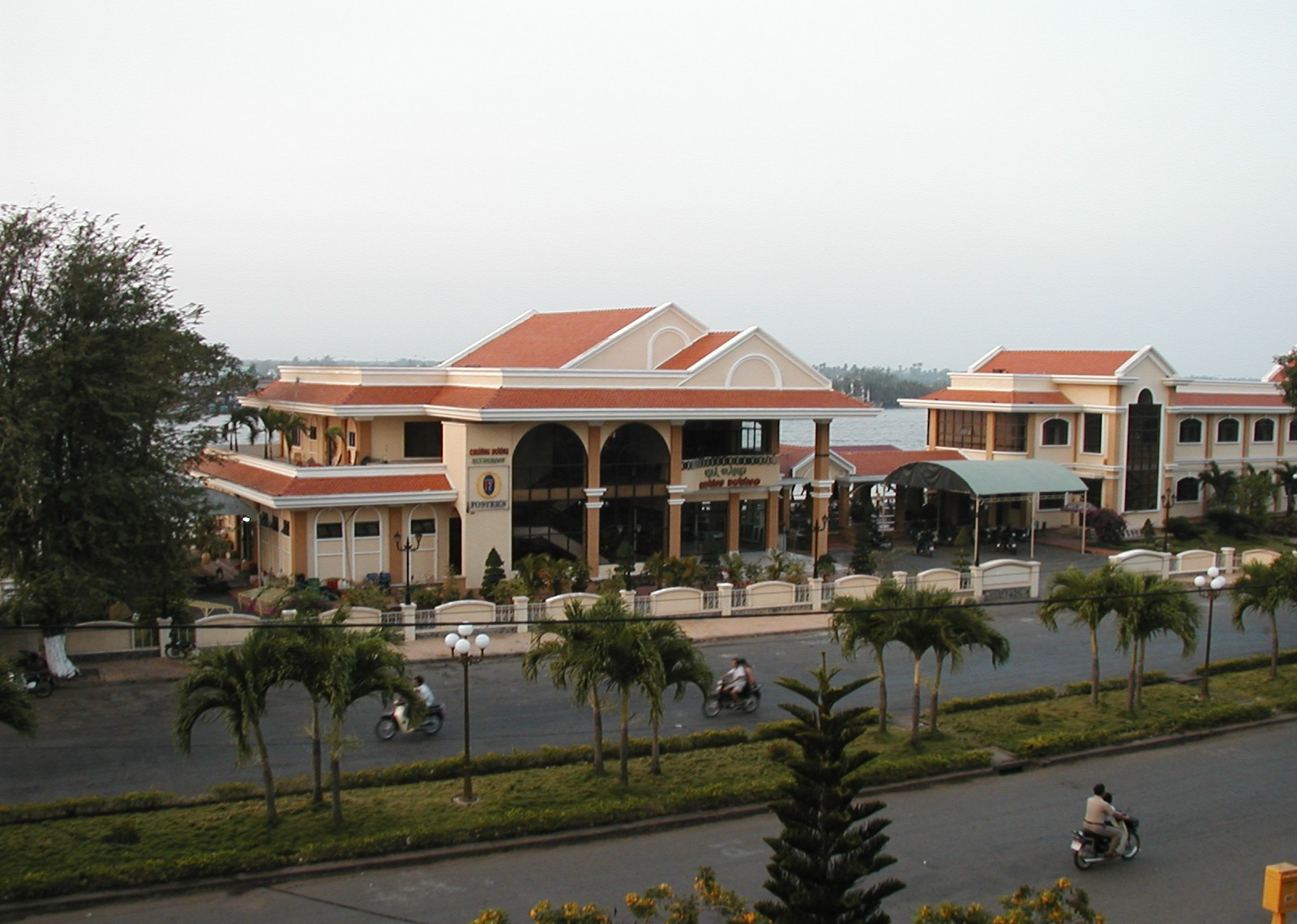
House on Bank of Mekong

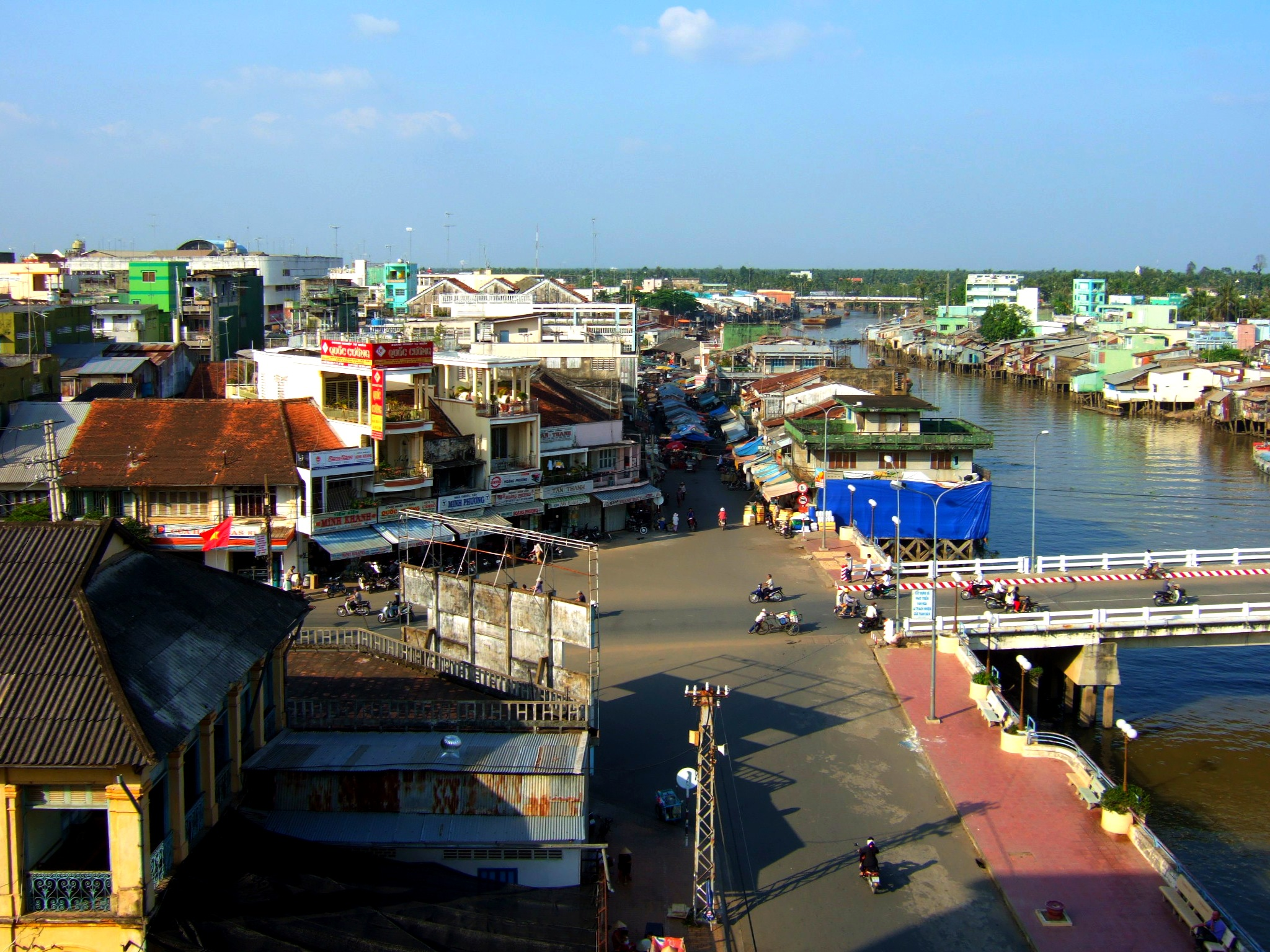
Downtown Mỹ Tho

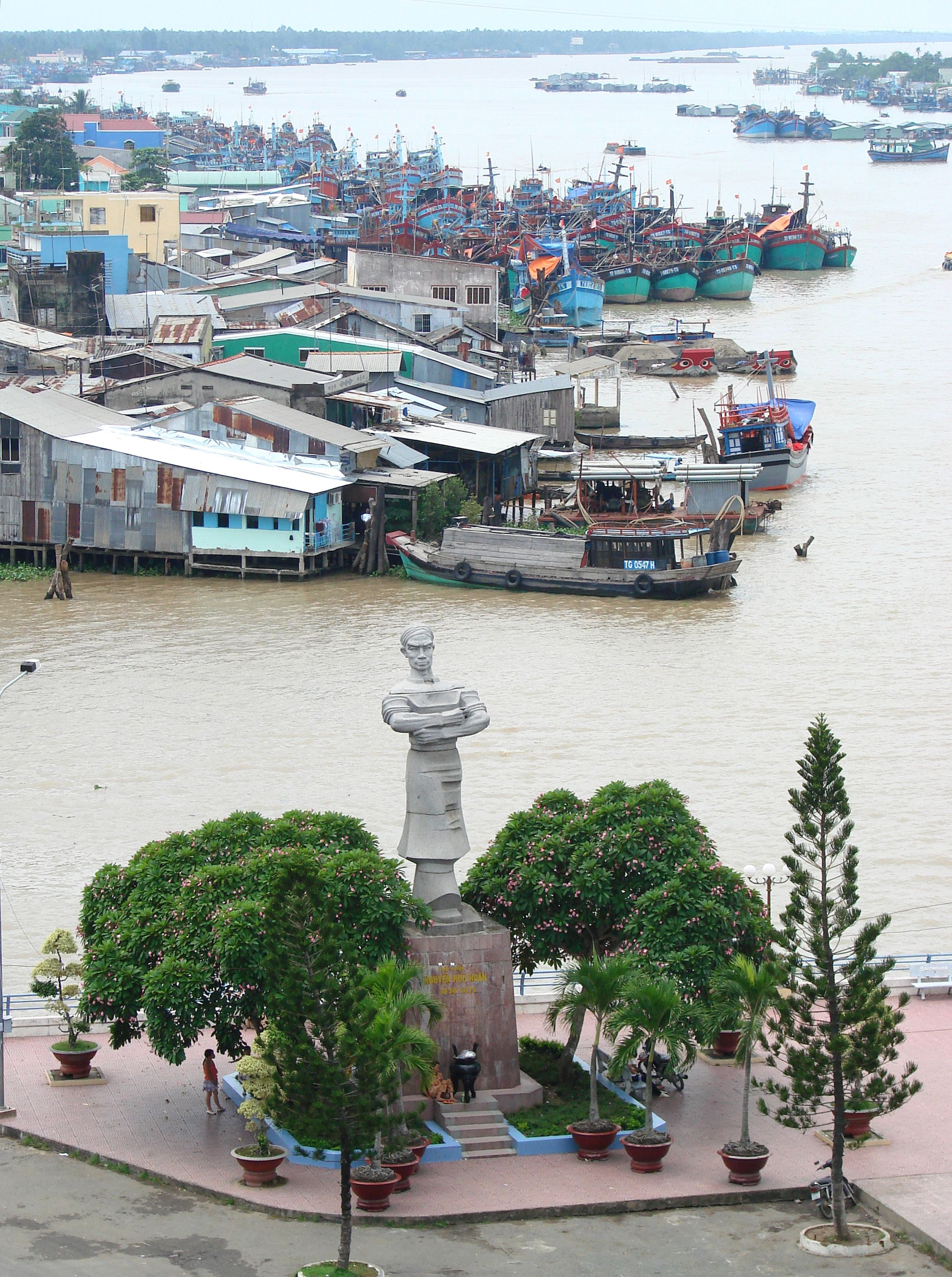
The center of Mỹ Tho with Nguyễn Hữu Huân statue

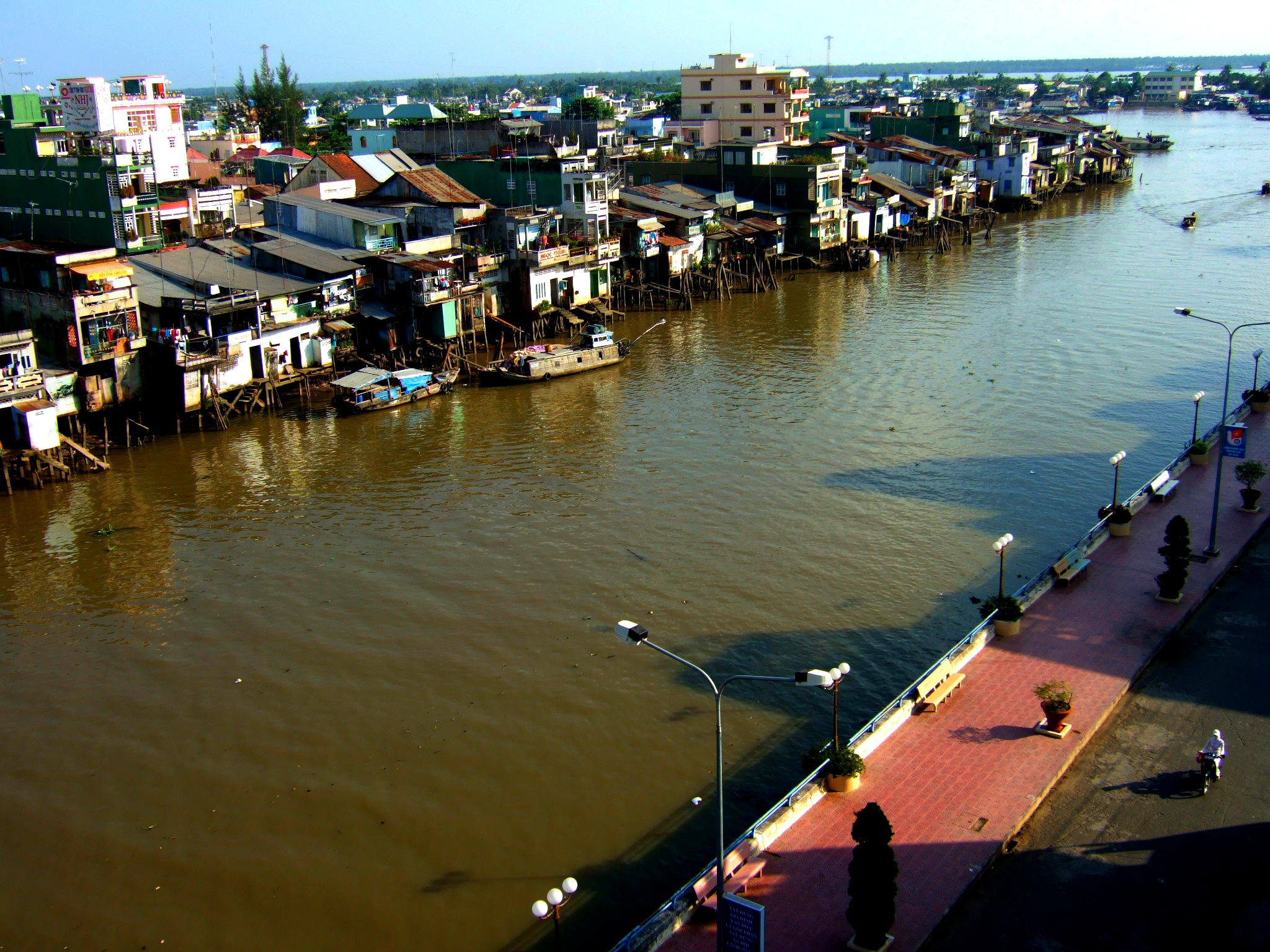
The waterfront houses on Bảo Đinh River in Mỹ Tho

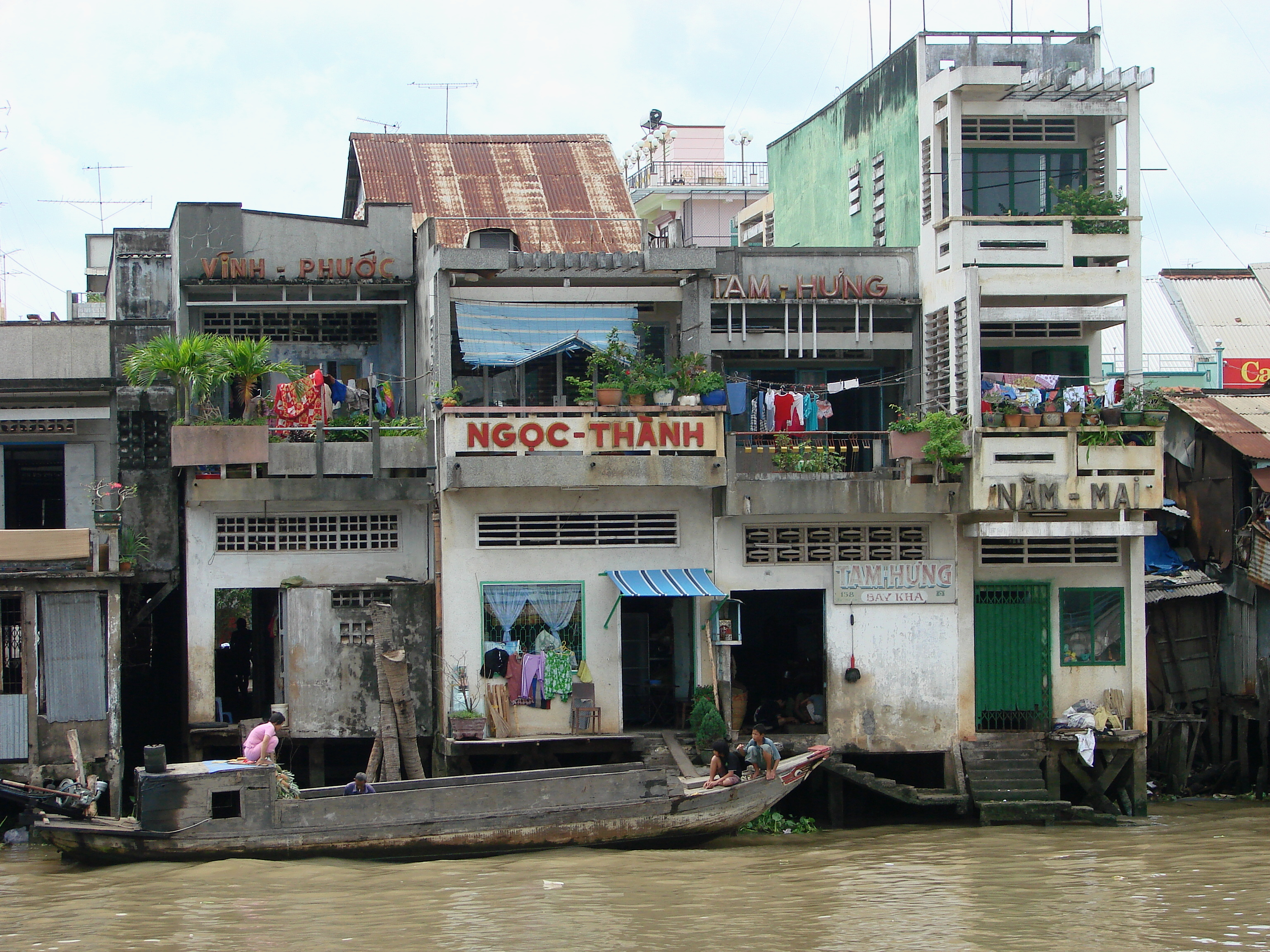
The waterfront shops

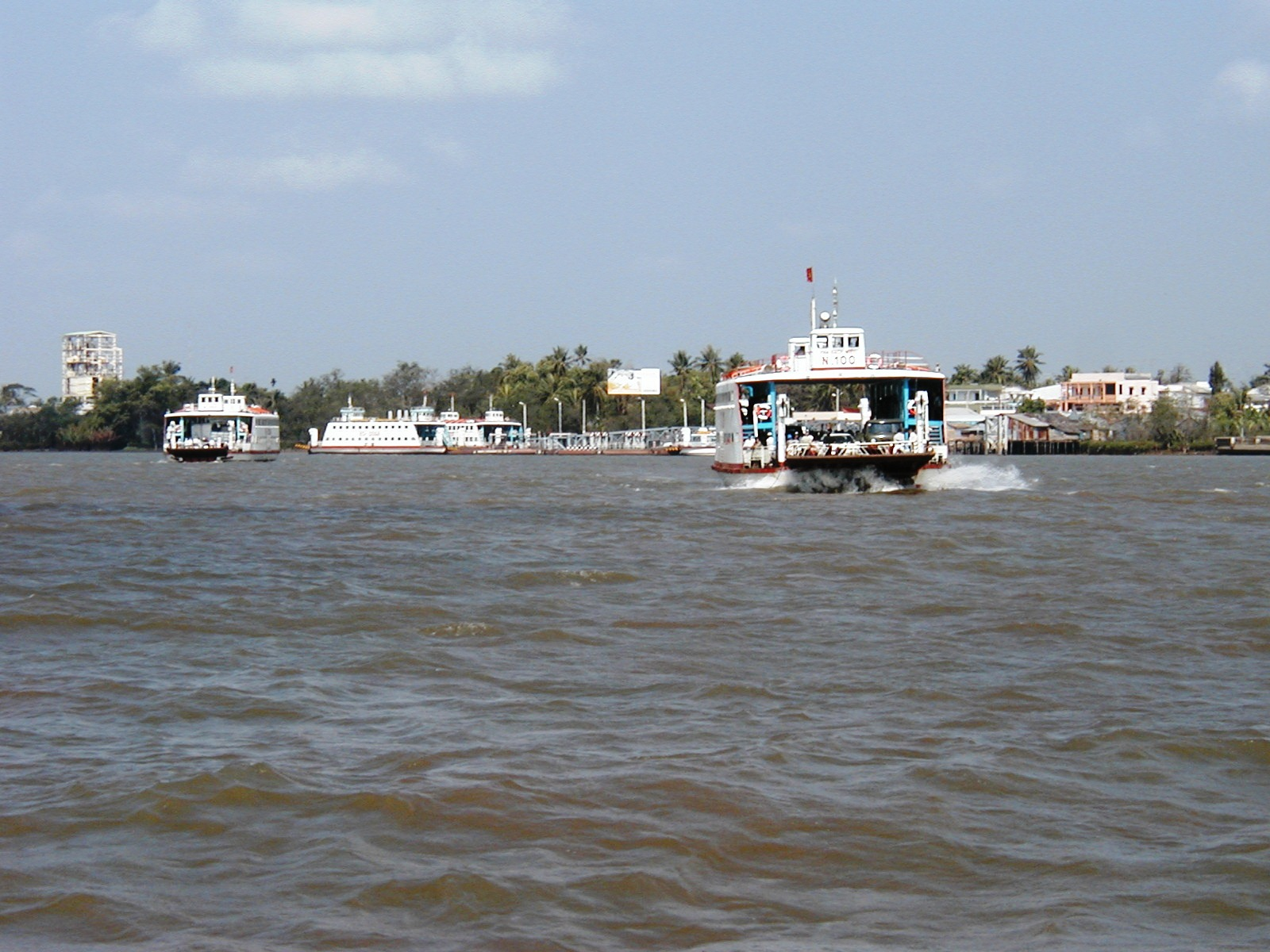
Rạch Miễu Ferry in 2002, now expired.
