= Thới Sơn Island =

Island on the Mỹ Tho River, Mekong Delta

Cù lao Thới Sơn, Cồn Lân
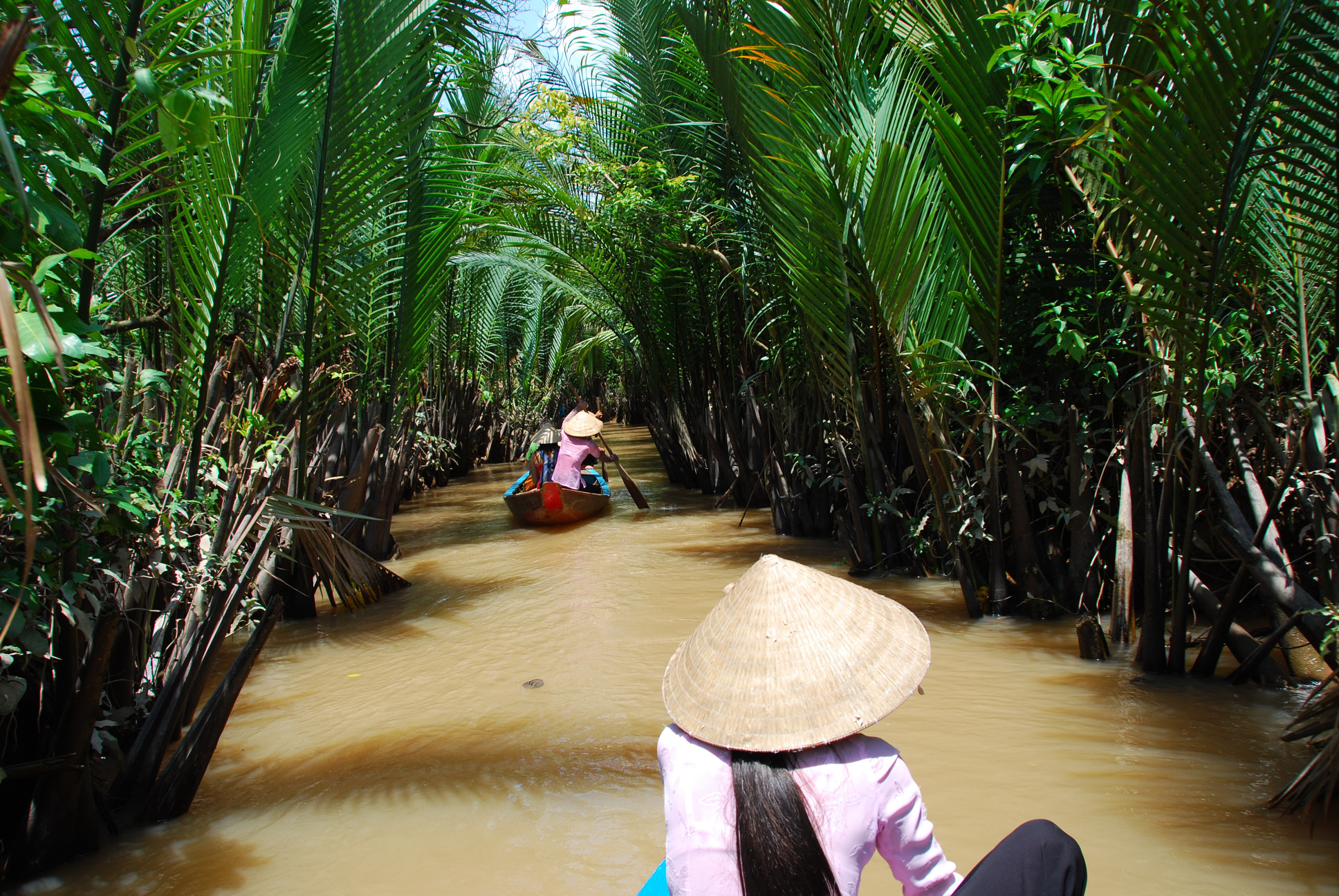
- Boat trip exploring Thới Sơn Island

- Location within Vietnam

Geography
- Coordinates: 10°19′56.5″N 106°19′48.5″E
- Area: 12 km^{2} (4.6 sq mi)

Thới Sơn Island is a river island on the Mỹ Tho River, Thới Sơn ward, Đồng Tháp Province, Vietnam. Before the 2025 administrative merger, it belonged to Tiền Giang Province. The islet is a popular tourist destination.

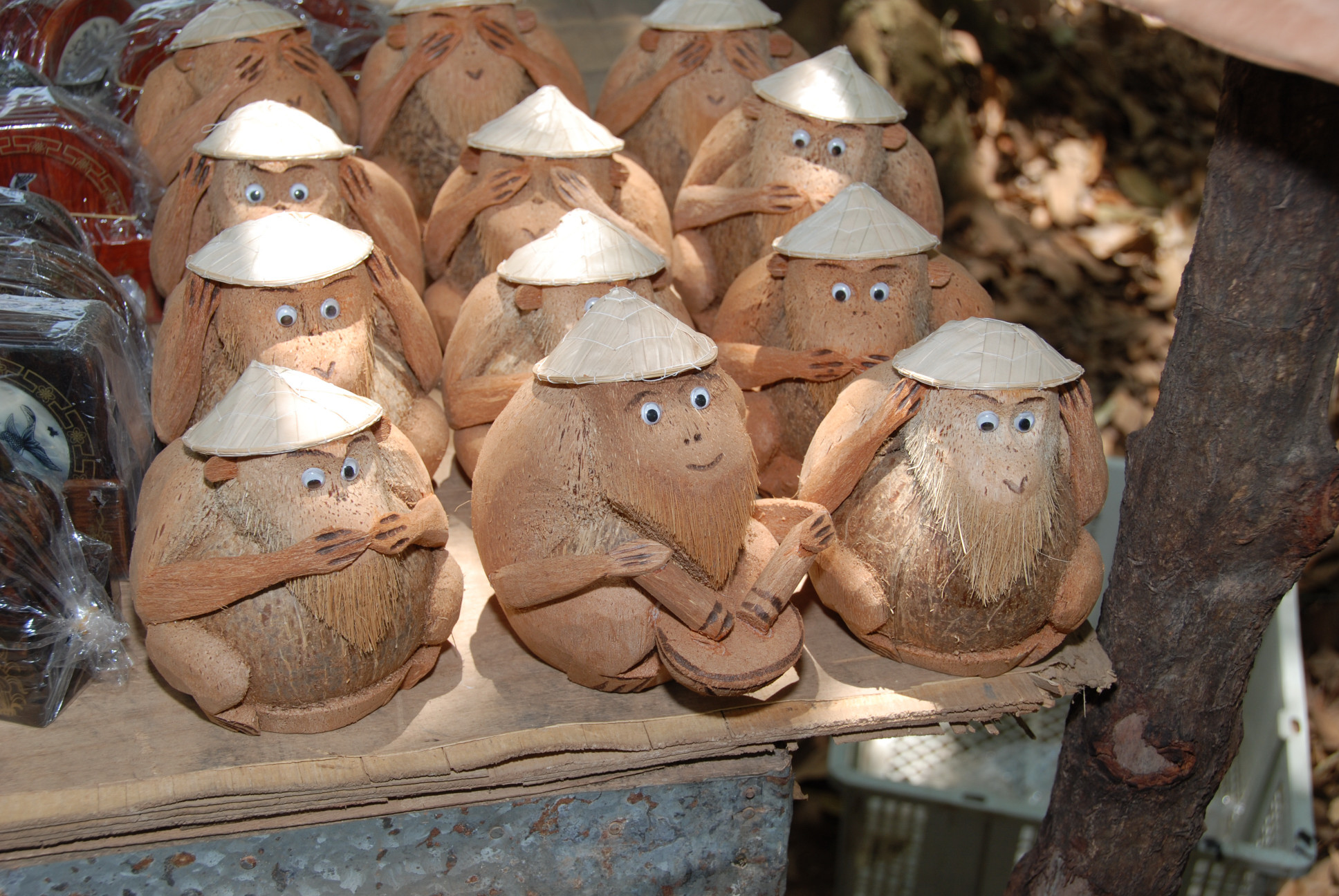
Coconut shells are carved into souvenirs.

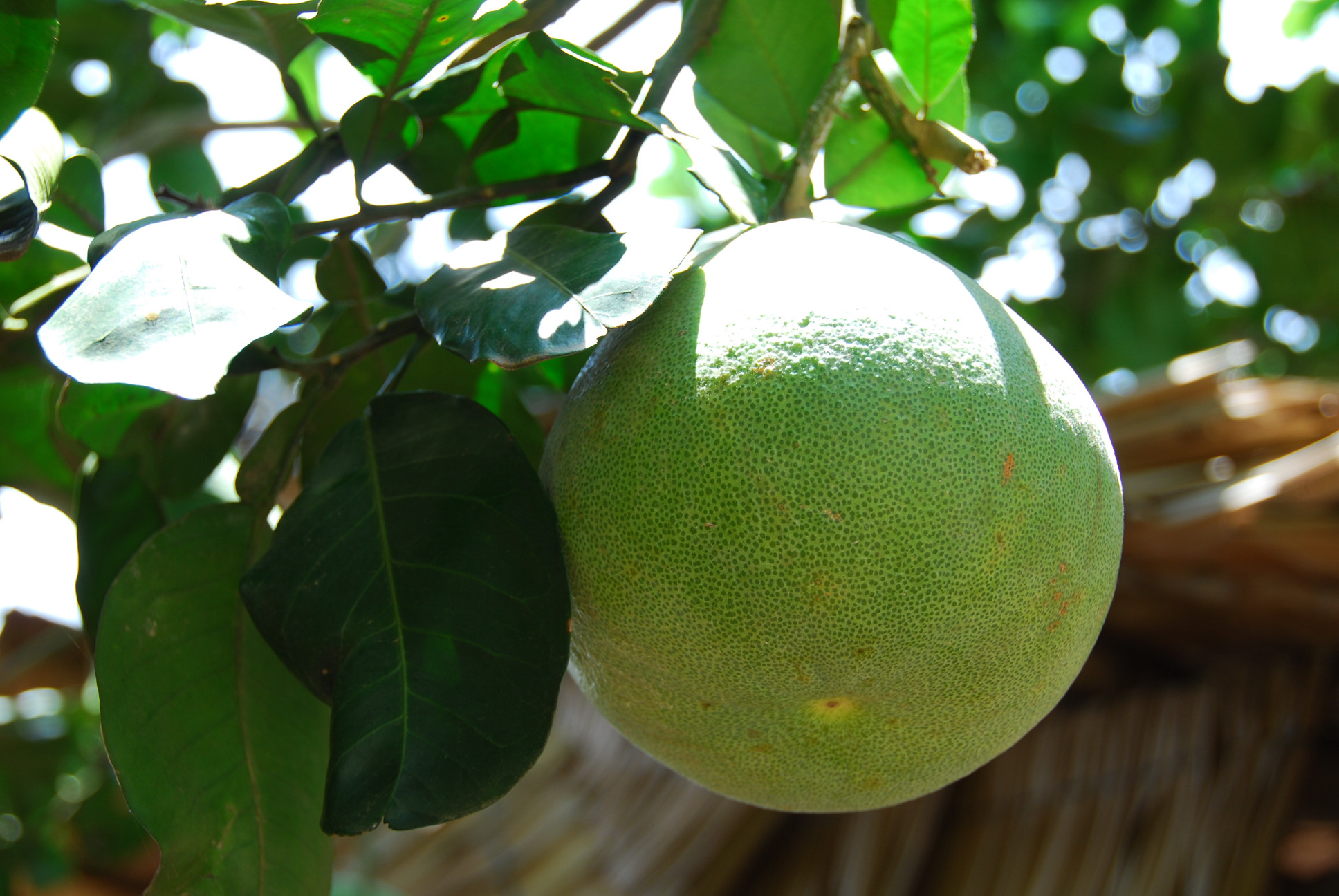
Pomelo tree on Thới Sơn Island

== Name ==
The islet is one of four islets located on the Mỹ Tho River between Đồng Tháp and Vĩnh Long provinces. Locals refer to these islets collectively as the Four Holy Beasts. Thới Sơn Island is named after the qilin (Lân in Vietnamese), hence its alternative name "Cồn Lân".

== Geography ==
It is also the largest of the four with a total area of approximately 12 km^{2}. The islet is formed by the sedimentation of the Mỹ Tho River - a branch of the Tiền River. Its fertile alluvial soil supports a variety of tropical fruit orchards, which have become a tourist attraction for the islet.

== Tourism ==
Since the 1990s, Thoi Son Island has become one of the most popular tourist destinations in the Mekong Delta. Visitors can explore the island by sampan through small canals, enjoy traditional đờn ca tài tử, and sample local specialties such as honey tea, coconut candy, and tropical fruits. The islet is often included in day tours from Ho Chi Minh City to the Mekong Delta.
