= Mỹ Tho, Đồng Tháp =

Ward and capital of Đồng Tháp province, Vietnam

Mỹ Tho Phường Mỹ Tho
- Ward
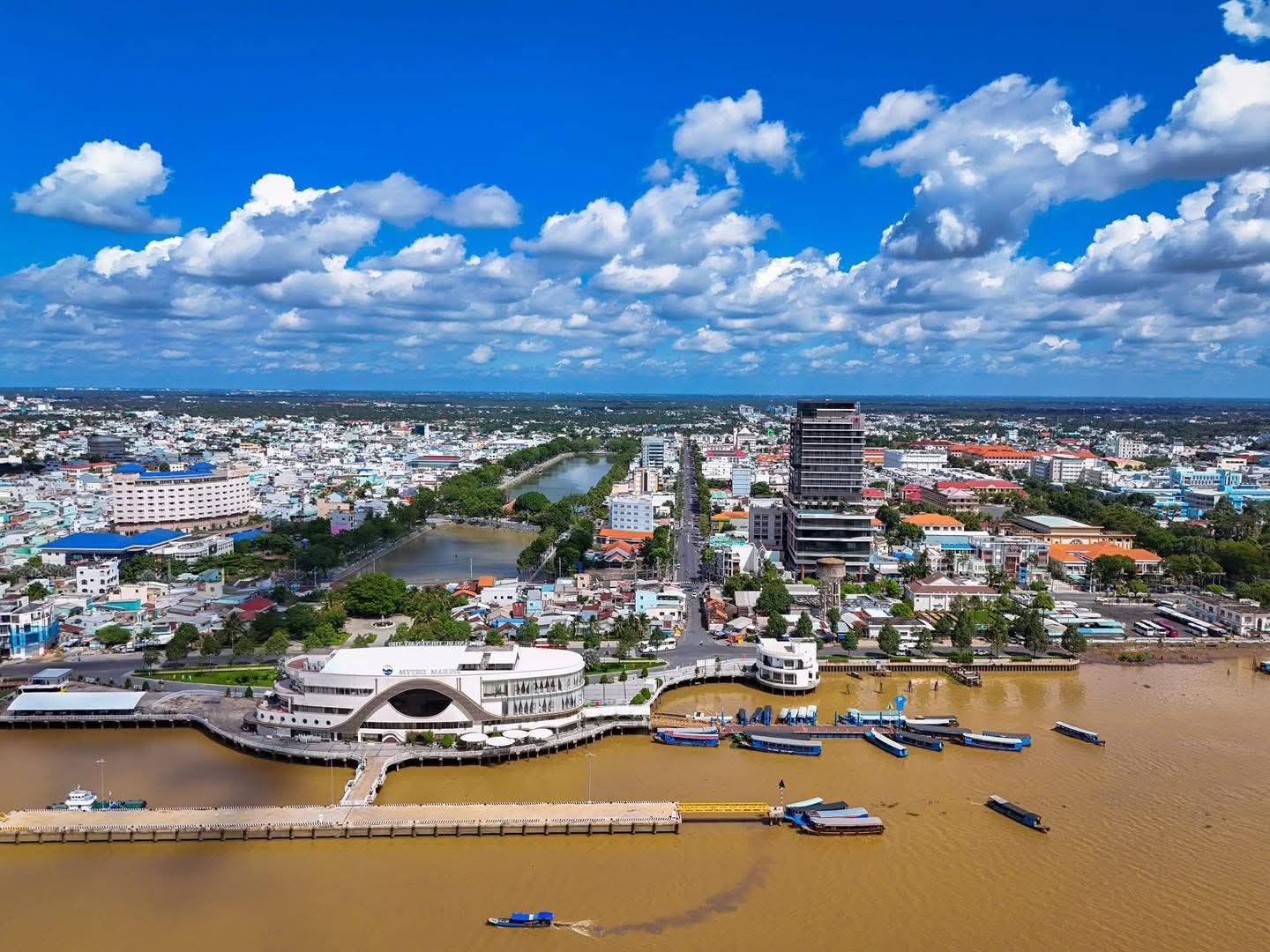
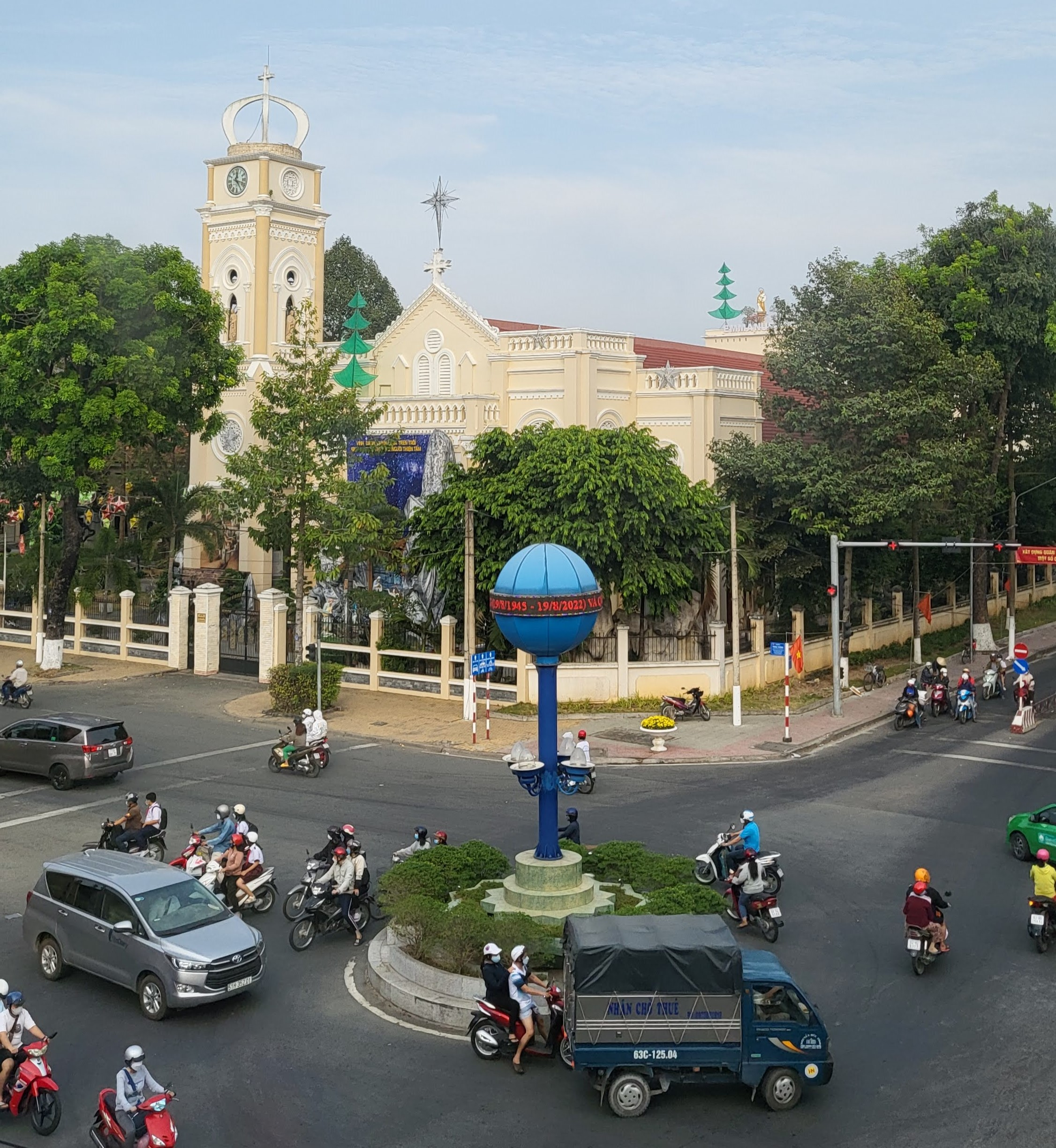
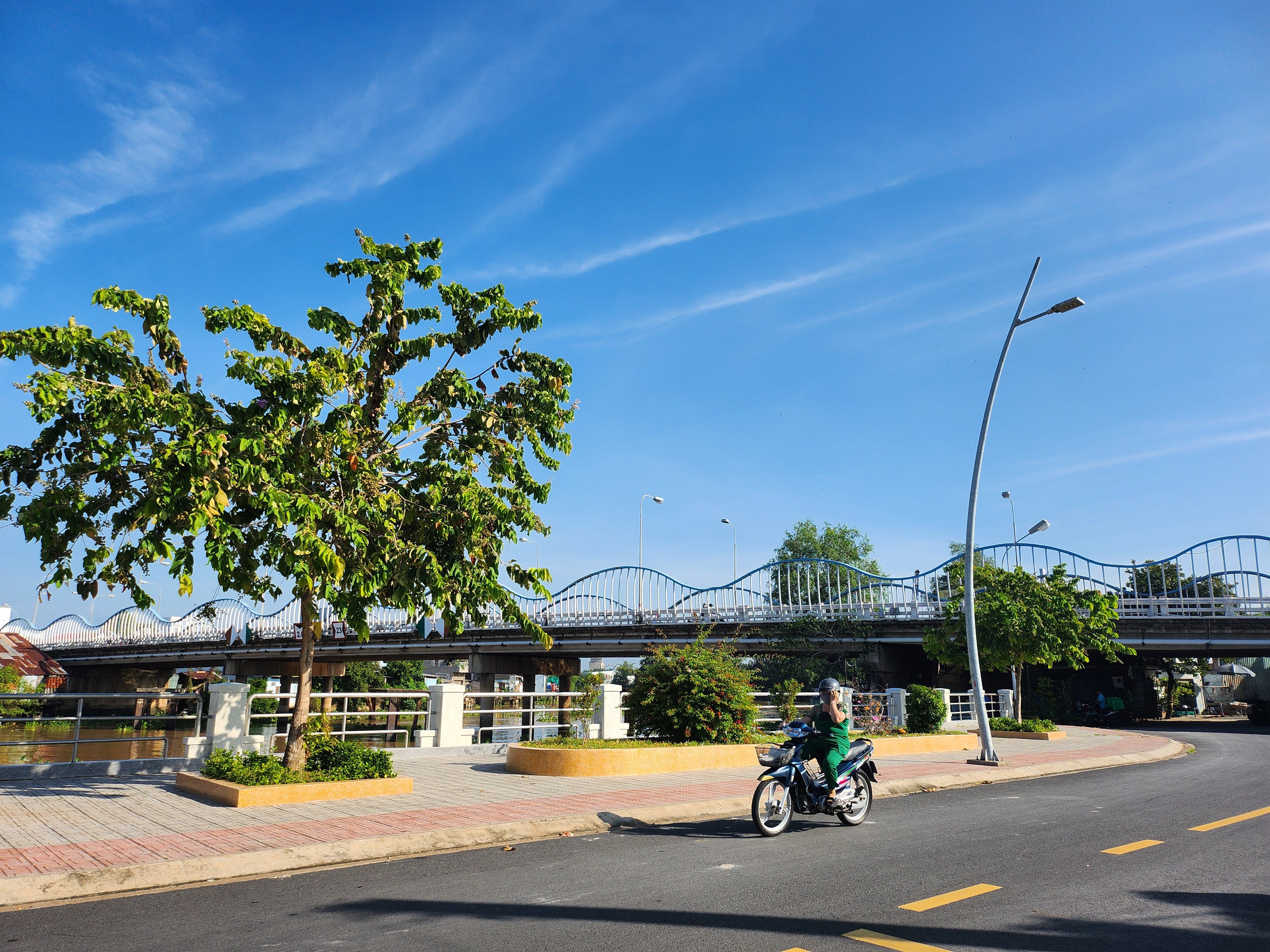
- From left to right, top to down: Mỹ Tho seen from above with Mỹ Tho Marina on Tiền River, Mỹ Tho Cathedral, a riverside park under Nguyễn Trãi Bridge crosses the Bảo Định River, Tân Long islet
- Interactive map of Mỹ Tho
- Country: Vietnam
- Province: Đồng Tháp province
- Date of establishment: 16th June, 2025
- People's Committee: No. 23, April 30 Street

Area
  - Total: 6.4 km^{2} (2.5 sq mi)
- Elevation: 5 m (16 ft)

Population (2025)
  - Total: 66,766
  - Density: 10,000/km^{2} (27,000/sq mi)
- Time zone: UTC+7
- Administrative code: 28261
- Website: http://mytho.dongthap.gov.vn/

Mỹ Tho; is a ward and capital of Đồng Tháp province, Vietnam. It is one of the 102 wards and communes of the province following the reorganization in 2025.

== History ==
Previously, Mỹ Tho ward was part of the following wards: 1, 2 and Tân Long (Tân Long Islet or Dragon Islet), central area of the former Mỹ Tho city.

June 12, 2025, 15th National Assembly Issued Resolution No. 202/2025/QH15 on the arrangement of provincial-level administrative units. Accordingly, the entire natural area and population size of the former Tiền Giang province were merged into Đồng Tháp province.

On June 16, 2025, the Standing Committee of the National Assembly of Vietnam issued Resolution No. 1663/NQ-UBTVQH15 on the arrangement of commune-level administrative units of Đồng Tháp province (effective from July 1). Accordingly, the entire area and population size of wards: 1, 2 and Tân Long of the former Mỹ Tho city were merged into a new ward named Mỹ Tho. (Excerpt from paragraph 83, article 1)

Mỹ Tho was divided into 36 neighborhoods: 1, 2, 3, 4, 5, 6, 7, 8, 9, 10, 11, 12, 13, 14, 15, 16, 17, 18, 19, 20, 21, 22, 23, 24, 25, 26, 27, 28, 29, 30, 31, 32, 33, Tân Bình, Tân Hòa, Thuận Hà. It was changed from July 2026.

== Geography ==
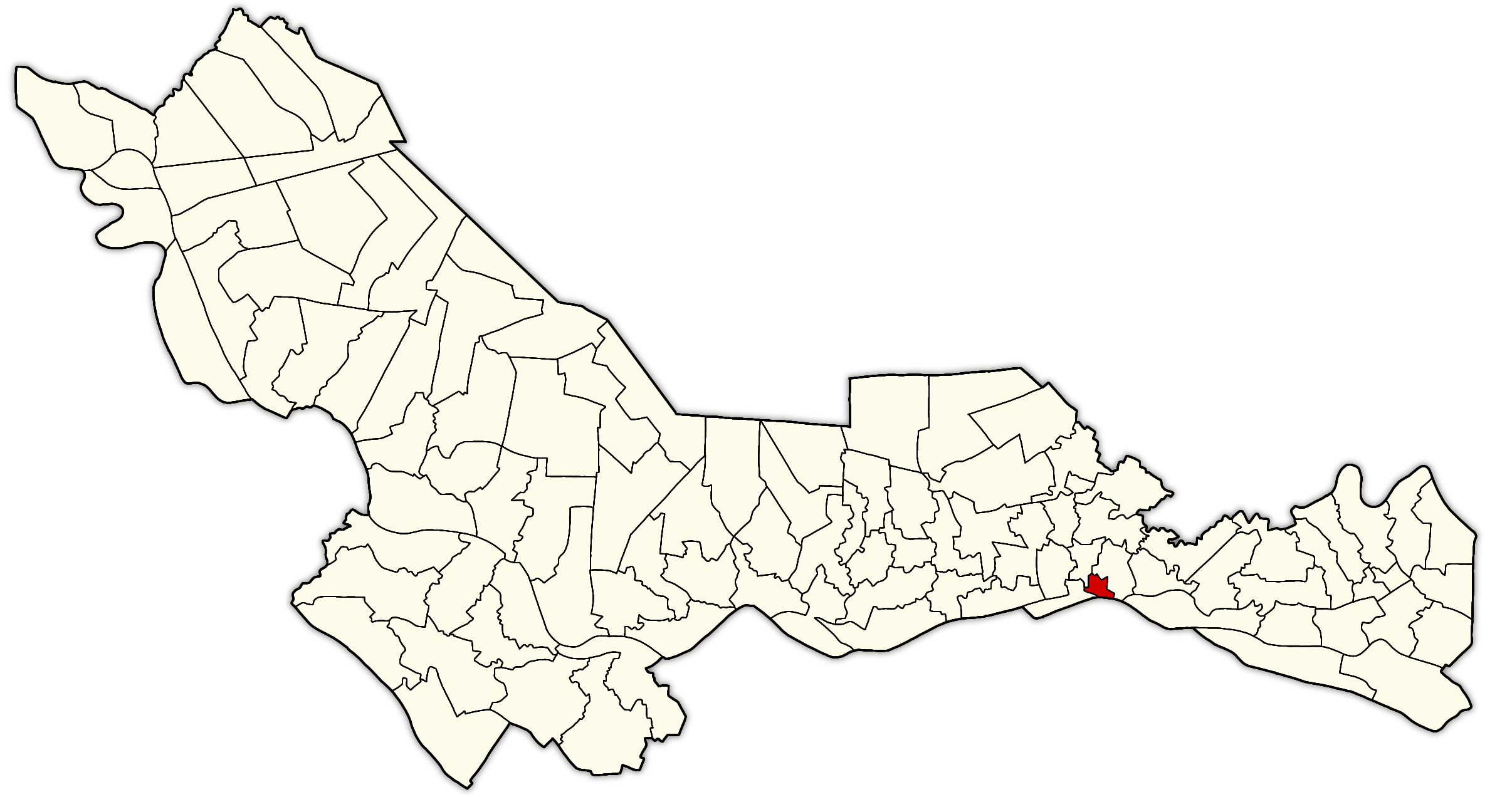
Location of Mỹ Tho ward in Đồng Tháp province map (highlight in red).

Mỹ Tho ward is located in the east of Đồng Tháp province, 100 km (62 mi) east of Cao Lãnh ward, 40 km (25 mi) west of Gò Công ward. The ward has the following geographical location:

- To the east and north borders Mỹ Phong ward.
- To the west borders the wards of Thới Sơn and Đạo Thạnh
- To the south, it borders the communes of Phú Túc and Giao Long of Vĩnh Long province by the Mỹ Tho river.

With an area of 6.4 km^{2} (2.5 sq mi), Mỹ Tho ward is the smallest ward in Đồng Tháp province.

== Administration ==
As of July 2026, Mỹ Tho is divided into 19 neighborhoods: 1, 2, 3, 4, 5, 6, 7, 8, 9, 10, 11, 12, 13, 14, 15, 16, 17, 18 and Tân Long.

== See also ==
- Mekong Delta
- Plan to arrange and merge administrative units in Vietnam 2024–2025
