= Châu Thành, Đồng Tháp =

Châu Thành
- Ward
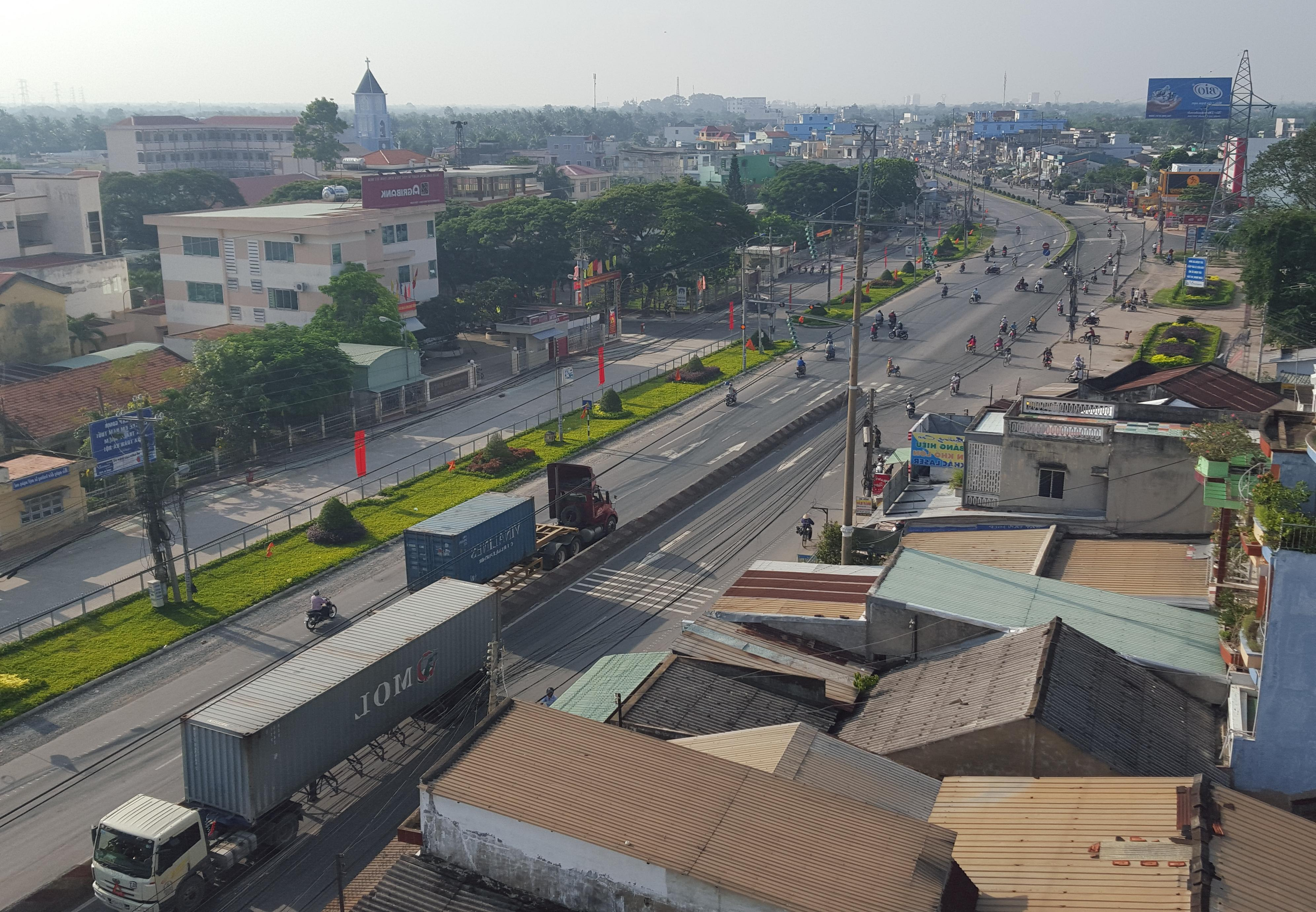
- National Route 1 in Châu Thành
- Interactive map of Châu Thành
- Coordinates: 10°26′46″N 106°20′30″E
- Country: Vietnam
- Province: Đồng Tháp province
- Established: June 16, 2025
- Become a ward: May 11, 2026

Area
  - Total: 9.37 sq mi (24.28 km^{2})

Population (2024)
  - Total: 57,070
  - Density: 6,088/sq mi (2,350/km^{2})
- Time zone: UTC+07:00 (Indochina Time)
- Administrative code: 28519
- Website: http://chauthanh.dongthap.gov.vn/

Châu Thành is a ward of Đồng Tháp province, Vietnam. It is one of the 102 new wards, communes and special zones of the province following the reorganization in 2025.

== Geography ==
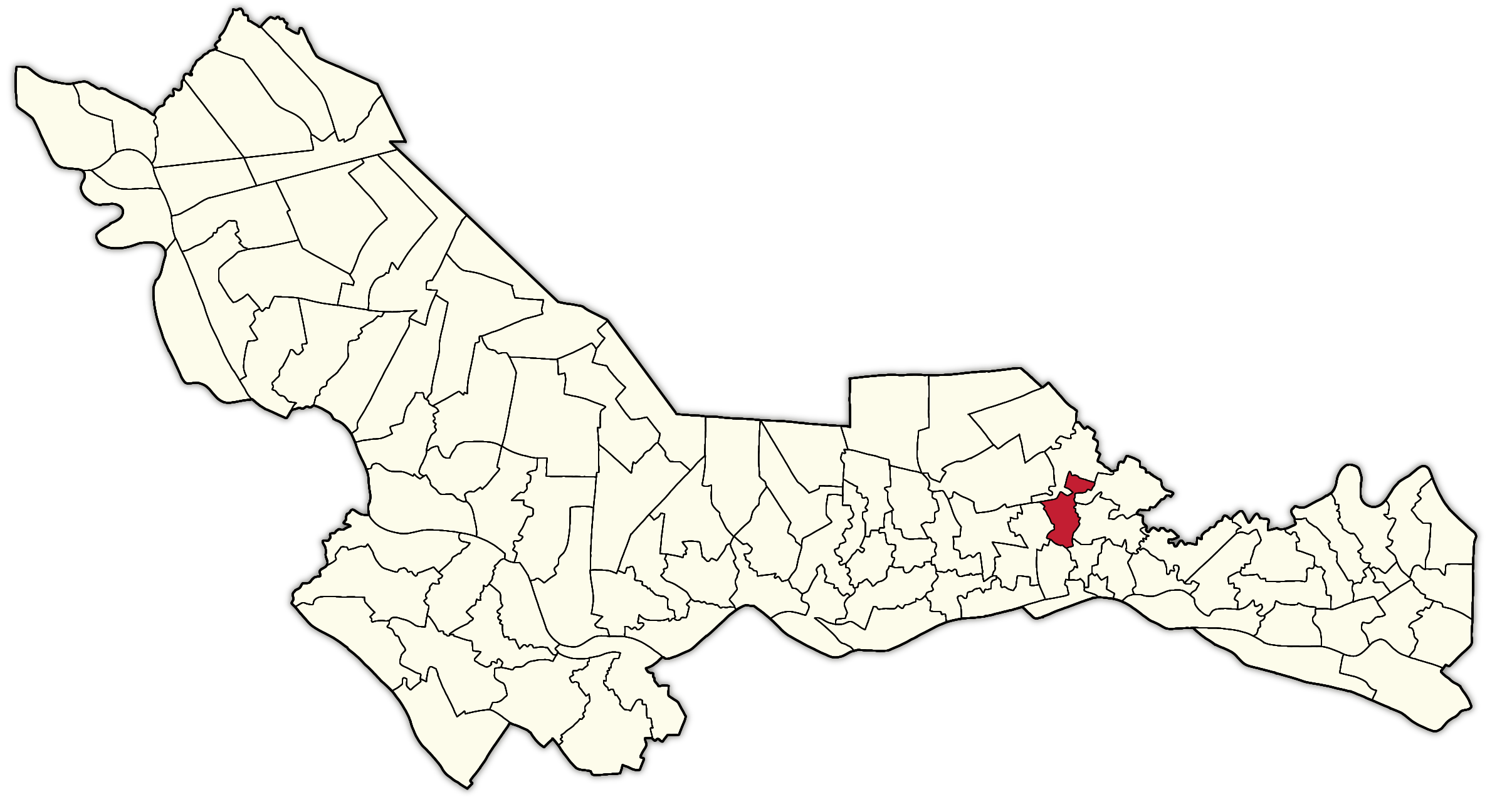
Location of Châu Thành ward on Đồng Tháp province map (highlight in red).

Châu Thành is a ward located in the eastern part of Đồng Tháp province, approximately 95km east of Cao Lãnh ward and about 15km north of Mỹ Tho ward. The commune has a geographical location:

- To the south, it borders Trung An ward and Đạo Thạnh ward.
- To the west, it borders Long Hưng commune.
- To the north, it borders Tân Hương commune.
- To the east, it borders Mỹ Tịnh An commune and Lương Hòa Lạc commune.

== History ==
On June 16, 2025, the National Assembly Standing Committee issued Resolution No. 1663/NQ-UBTVQH15 on the arrangement of commune-level administrative units of Đồng Tháp province in 2025 (effective from June 16, 2025). Accordingly, the entire land area and population of Tân Hiệp township, Thân Cửu Nghĩa and Long An communes of the former Châu Thành district, Tiền Giang province will be integrated into a new commune named Châu Thành (Clause 59, Article 1).

On May 11, 2026, the People's Council of Đồng Tháp province approved the plan to establish 11 new wards in the province. Accordingly:

- The Châu Thành ward was established based on the entire area and population of Châu Thành commune.
