= Trung An =

- Ward
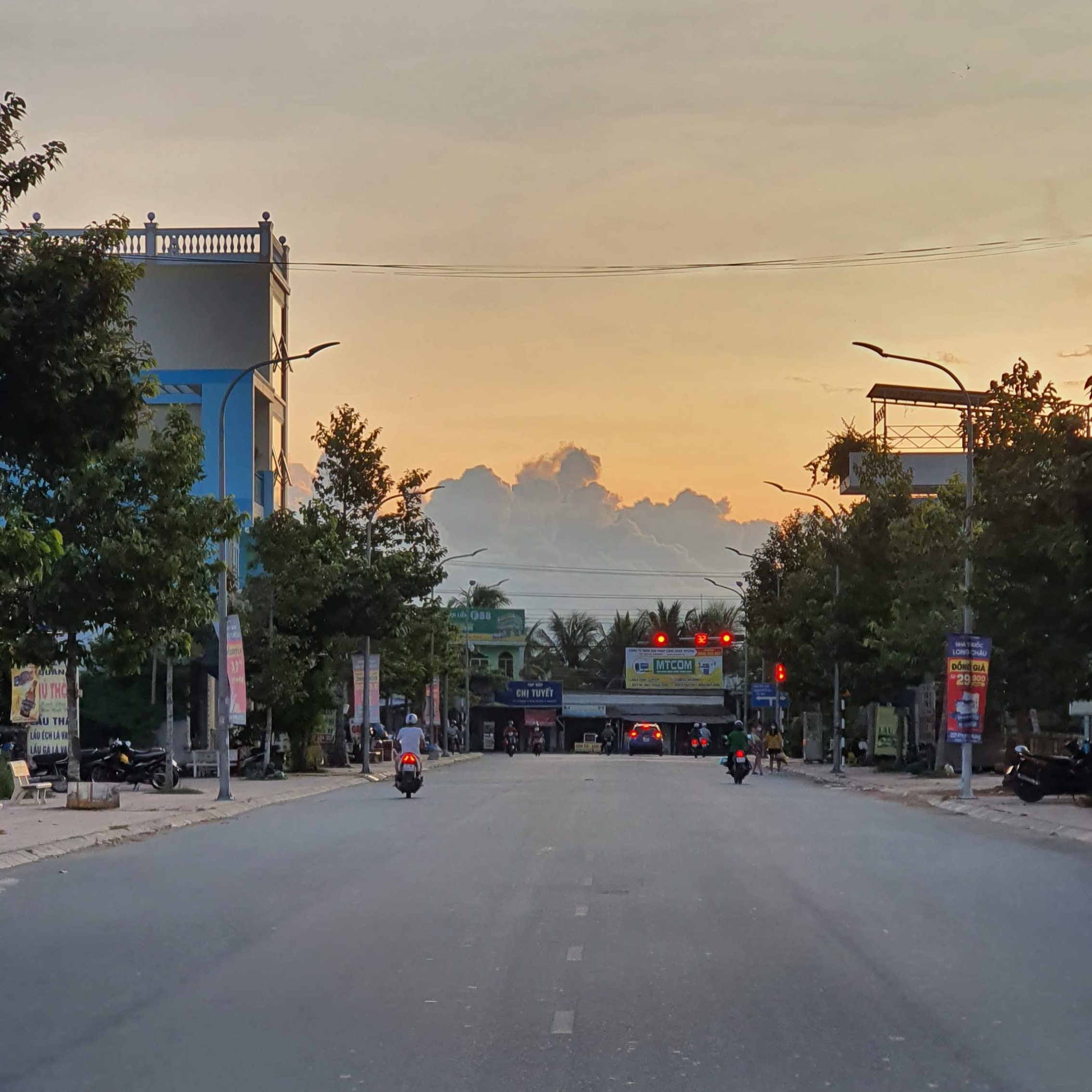
- Nguyễn Công Bình street in Trung An ward
- Interactive map of Trung An
- Coordinates: 10°22′07″N 106°19′34″E
- Country: Vietnam
- Province: Đồng Tháp
- Establish: June 16, 2025
- Headquarters of the People's Committee: 196, Phạm Hùng street, Trung An ward

Area
  - Total: 23.4 km^{2} (9.0 sq mi)

Population (2025)
  - Total: 70,479 people
  - Density: 3,010/km^{2} (7,800/sq mi)

Trung An is a ward in Đồng Tháp province, Vietnam. It is one of 102 communes and wards in the province following the 2025 reorganization.

== Geography ==
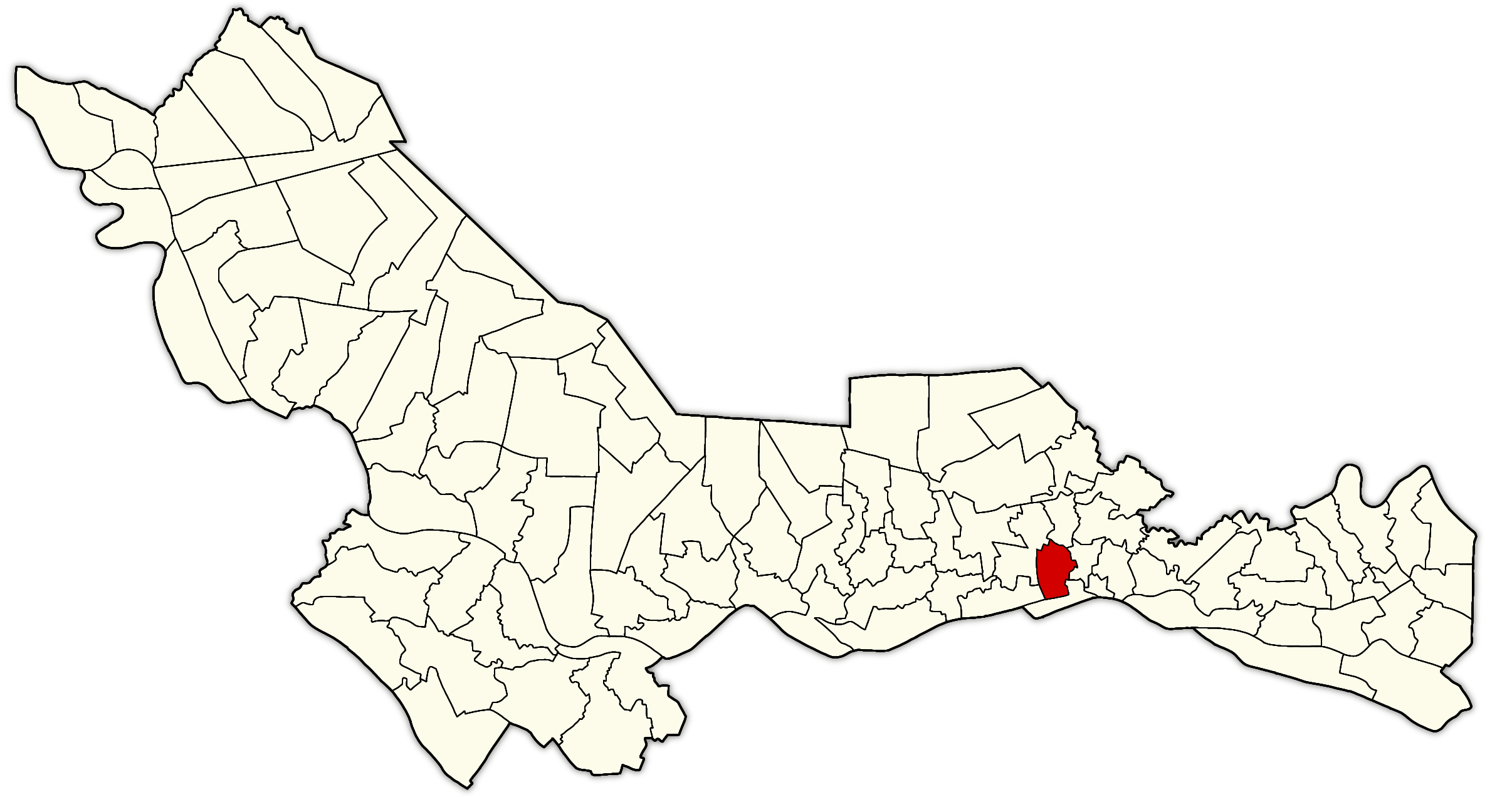
Location of Trung An ward in Đồng Tháp province map (highlight in red).

Trung An is a ward located in the eastern part of Đồng Tháp province, 100km east of Cao Lãnh ward and 40km west of Gò Công ward. The ward has the following geographical location:

- To the north, it borders Châu Thành commune.
- To the south, it borders Thới Sơn ward.
- To the east, it borders Đạo Thạnh ward.
- To the west, it borders Long Hưng commune and Kim Sơn commune.

== Administrative divisions ==
Trung An ward is divided into 20 neighborhoods: 1, 2, 3, 4, 5, 6, 7, 8, 9, 10, Bình Tạo, Bình Tạo A, Chợ, Đồng, Giáp Nước, Long Hưng, Long Mỹ, Phước Hòa, Phước Thuận, Trung Lương.

== History ==
Prior to 2025, Trung An Ward was formerly ward 10 and two communes: Trung An and Phước Thạnh, belonging to Mỹ Tho city, Tiền Giang province.

On June 12, 2025, the National Assembly of Vietnam issued Resolution No. 202/2025/QH15 on the reorganization of provincial-level administrative units. Accordingly:

- The province of Đồng Tháp was established by merging the entire area and population of Đồng Tháp province and Tiền Giang province.

On June 16, 2025, the Standing Committee of the National Assembly of Vietnam issued Resolution No. 1663/NQ-UBTVQH15 on the reorganization of commune-level administrative units in Đồng Tháp province, accordingly:

- The Trung An ward was established by merging the entire area and population of ward 10, Trung An commune, and Phước Thạnh commune (formerly part of Mỹ Tho city; excerpt from Clause 87, Article 1).
