= Đạo Thạnh =

- Ward
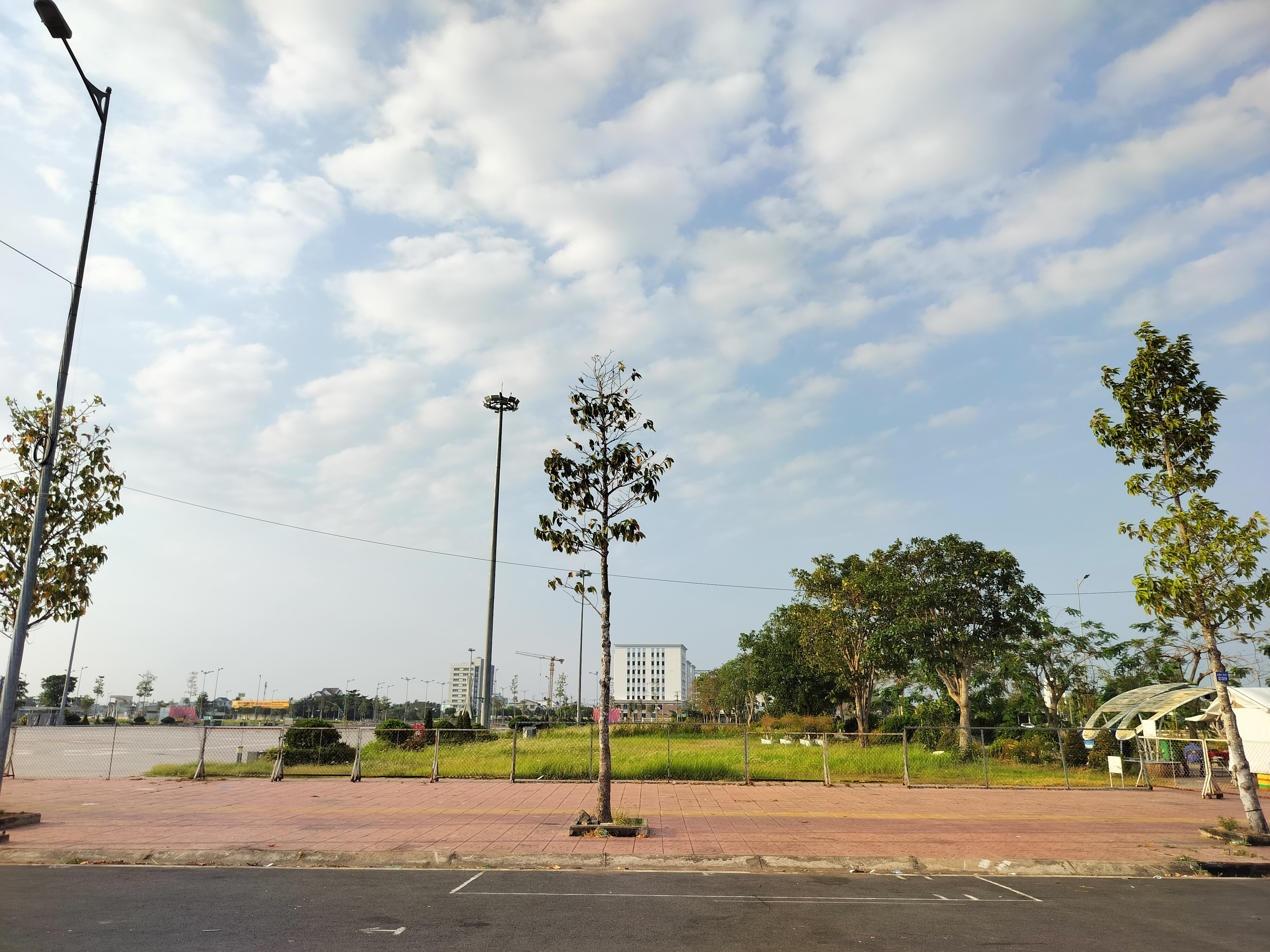
- Đồng Tháp Provincial Square
- Interactive map of Đạo Thạnh
- Country: Vietnam
- Province: Đồng Tháp
- Establish: June 16, 2025

Area
  - Total: 14 km^{2} (5.4 sq mi)

Population (2024)
  - Total: 73,370 people
  - Density: 5,200/km^{2} (14,000/sq mi)

Đạo Thạnh is a ward in Đồng Tháp province, Vietnam. It is one of 102 wards and communes in the province.

== Geography ==
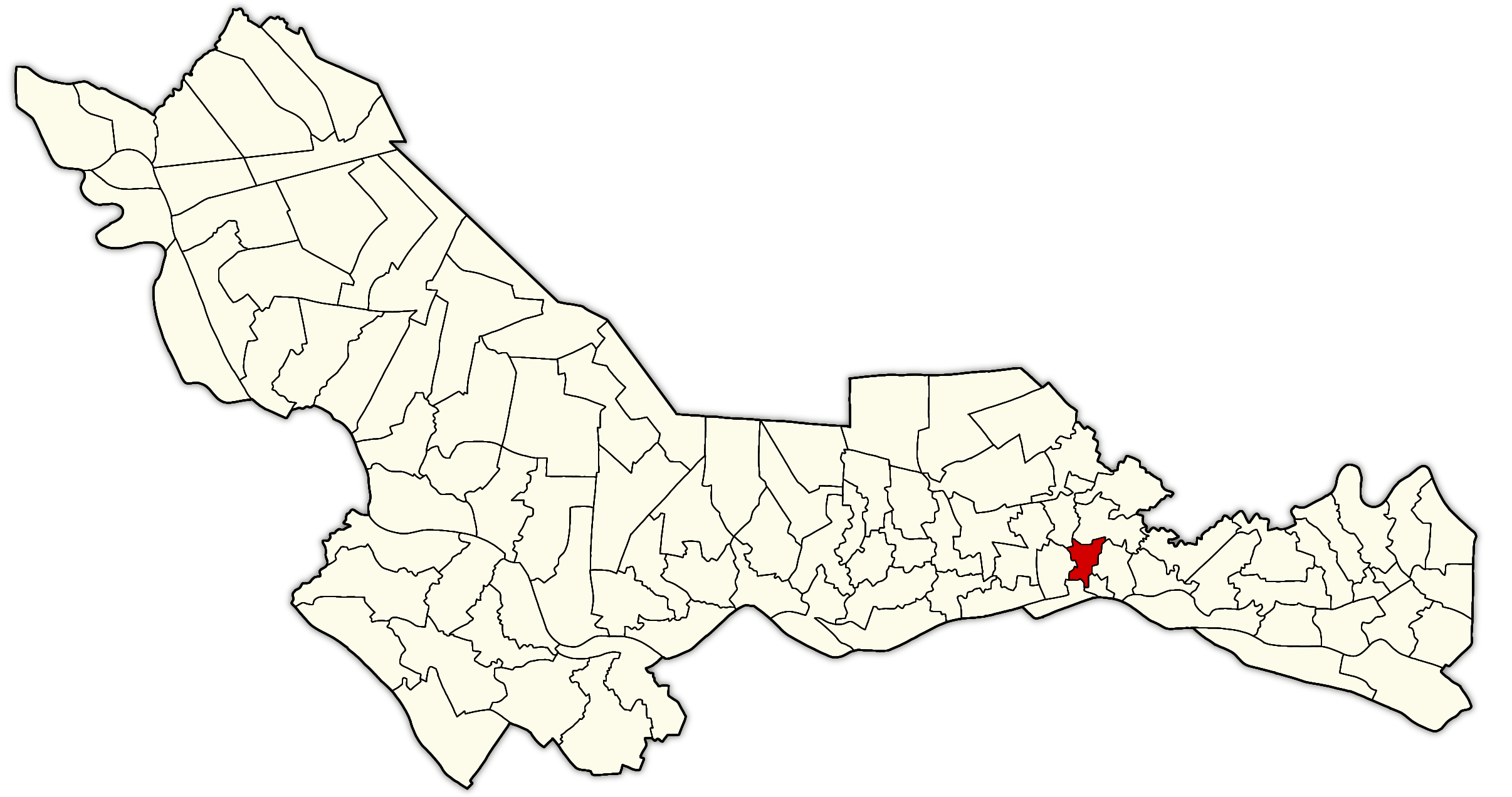
Location of Đạo Thạnh ward in Đồng Tháp province map (highlight in red).

Đạo Thạnh is a ward located in the eastern part of Đồng Tháp province, 110 km east of Cao Lãnh ward. The ward has the following geographical location:

- To the north, it borders Châu Thành commune and Lương Hòa Lạc commune.
- To the east, it borders Mỹ Phong and Mỹ Tho wards.
- To the south, it borders Thới Sơn ward.
- To the west, it borders Trung An ward.

== History ==
Before 2025, Đạo Thạnh ward was part of Mỹ Tho city.

On June 12, 2025, the 15th National Assembly issued Resolution No. 202/2025/QH15 on the reorganization of provincial-level administrative units. Accordingly, the entire natural area and population size of Tiền Giang province and Đồng Tháp province will be combined into a new province called Đồng Tháp province.

On June 16, 2025, the Standing Committee of the National Assembly issued Resolution No. 1663/NQ-UBTVQH15 on the rearrangement of commune-level administrative units in Dong Thap province in 2025. Accordingly, the entire natural area and population size of Ward 4, Ward 5, and Đạo Thạnh commune of the former Mỹ Tho city will be reorganized into a new ward named Đạo Thạnh.
