= Nguyễn Hữu Huân =

Nguyễn Hữu Huân (1830 – 1875), commonly known as Thủ Khoa Huân, was a Vietnamese scholar and anti-French nationalist revolutionary, who led three uprisings against the French colony during 15 years from 1861 to 1875.

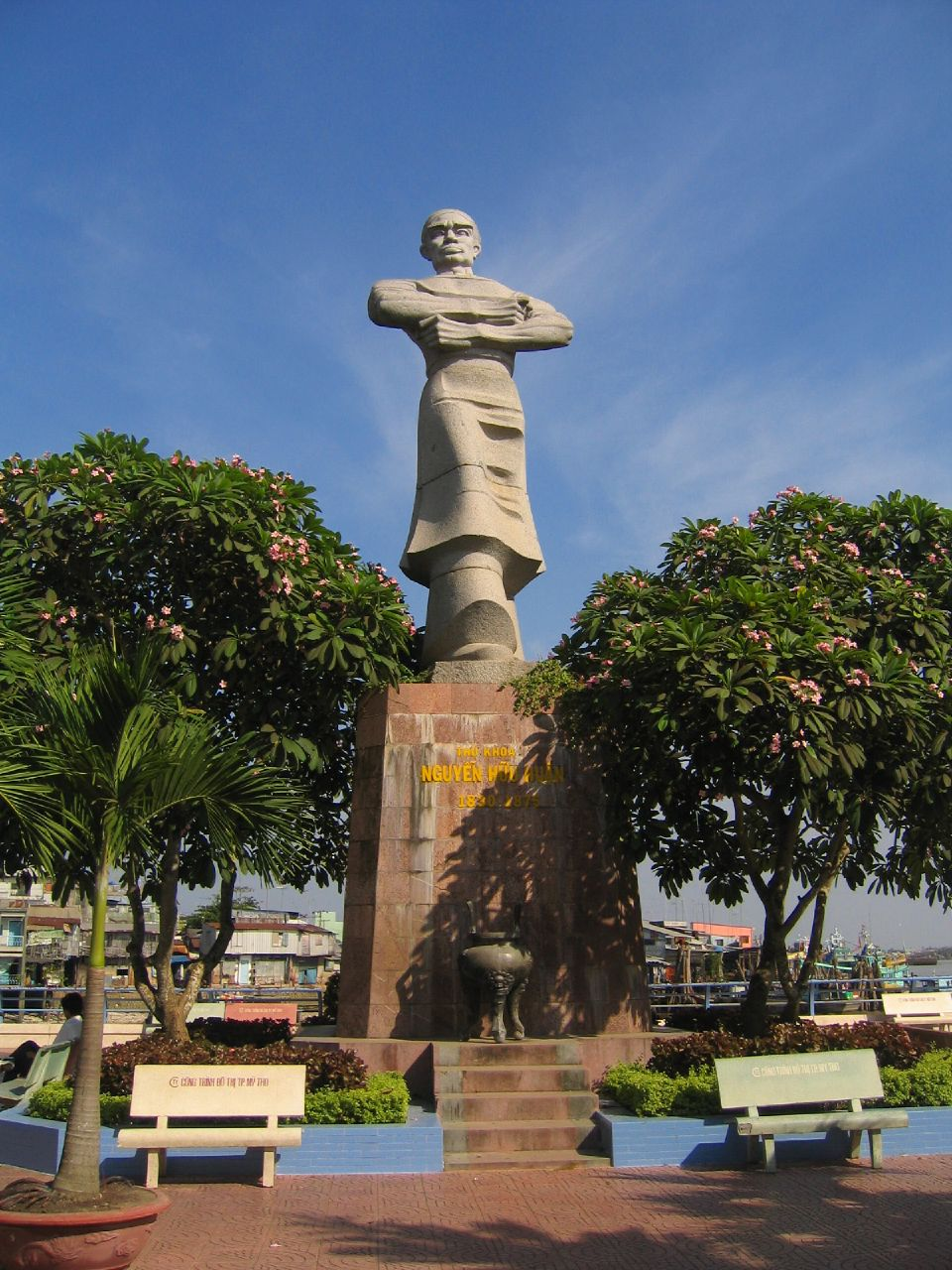
Statue of Thủ Khoa Huân in Mỹ Tho city

In April 1861, the French - Spanish coalition captured Mỹ Tho, Thủ Khoa Huân together with Thiên Hộ Dương gathered forces and raised an armed uprising against the invaders. The uprising began at Tân An, then spread to Mỹ Tho.

== Related articles ==
Cochinchina | Định Tường province | Mỹ Tho province
