= Rạch Miễu Bridge =

Rạch Miễu Bridge Cầu Rạch Miễu
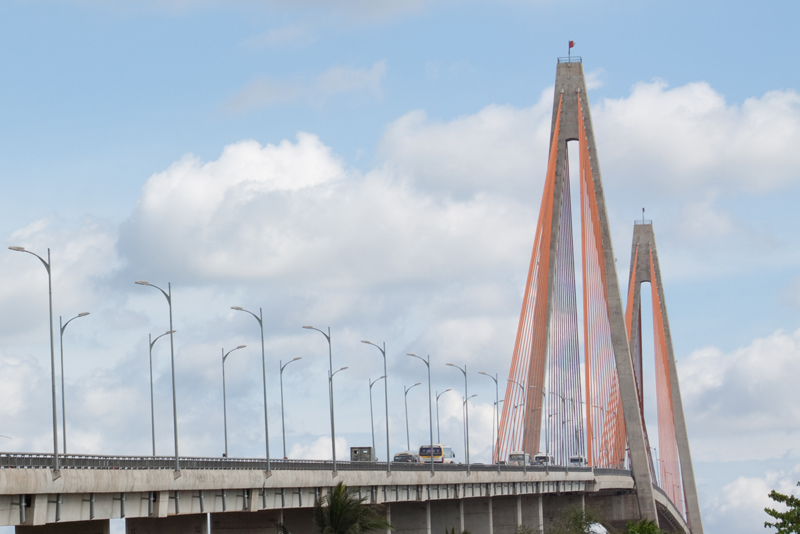
- Rạch Miễu Bridge in 2011
- Coordinates: 10°20′13″N 106°20′38″E
- Carries: 2 lanes (1 each way)
- Crosses: Mekong river
- Locale: Đồng Tháp & Vĩnh Long, Vietnam
- Maintained by: Tổng công ty Tư vấn thiết kế GTVT (TEDI)

Characteristics
- Design: Cable-stayed bridge
- Total length: 2,868 metres (9,409 ft), 8,331 meters (27,333 ft) include approaches
- Width: 12 metres (39 ft)
- Height: 117 metres (384 ft)
- Longest span: 270 metres (890 ft)
- Clearance below: 37.5 metres (123 ft)

History
- Construction start: 30 April 2002
- Opened: 19 January 2009

Location
- Interactive map of Rạch Miễu Bridge

Rạch Miễu Bridge (Vietnamese: Cầu Rạch Miễu) is a cable-stayed bridge in the Mekong Delta, Vietnam. The bridge connects Đồng Tháp Province (Thới Sơn Ward ) with Vĩnh Long Province (Phú Túc Commune ), over the Tiền River. Construction began on 30 April 2002 and was completed in January 2009, when the bridge was inaugurated. With a total length is 8,331 metres (27,333 ft), including approach ramps, the main bridge is 2,868 metres (9,409 ft) long.

Under the original schedule, the bridge would have been completed and opened for traffic in late 2007.

- Length: 8331 m including approach ramps. The main bridge consists of two separate parts No. 1 and No. 2 for a total length of 2868 m, which is a cable-stayed structure layout 117 m-270 m-117 m pace, not static navigational clearance height 37.5 m. In the middle of the bridge is island Thoi Son. The 990-metre-long (3,250 ft) bridge consists of two spans up to 90 m in length to inform the way the boat is 7-metre-high (23 ft) reinforced concrete beams pre-stressed construction the balanced cantilever method. The span girder bridge that leads pre-stressed concrete reinforced each span 40 metres in length. The ramp has a total length of two 5463 m and two main bridges with total length of 2868 m crosses the tributaries of Tien Giang and Thoi Son.
- At 7:30 am on 20 August, the Ministry of Transport and the provinces of Ben Tre and Tien Giang held a connection with two cable-stayed span of the bridge to connect the provinces.
- The length of the main span is 270 m, and the clearance is 37.5 m to allow ships of 10,000 tons go through.
- Bridge width: 12–15 m with two lanes of traffic
- General construction contractors: joint venture CIENCO1 - CIENCO5 - CIENCO6
- Bridge load: 30 tons
- Total investment: VND 1,400 billion (US$84 million)

== Traffic problems ==
The bridge experiences significant traffic, with 18000–20000 vehicles using the bridge daily in 2020.

Lunar New Year of the Ox in 2009, it was stuck in rush hours from 29th to 6th of Lunar calendar, one of the causes of traffic congestion is due to happen for the traffic on the narrow bridge, while being some vendors do where encroachment trafficking, in addition to those people who visit and take pictures on demand.
