= Tiền River =

River in Vietnam

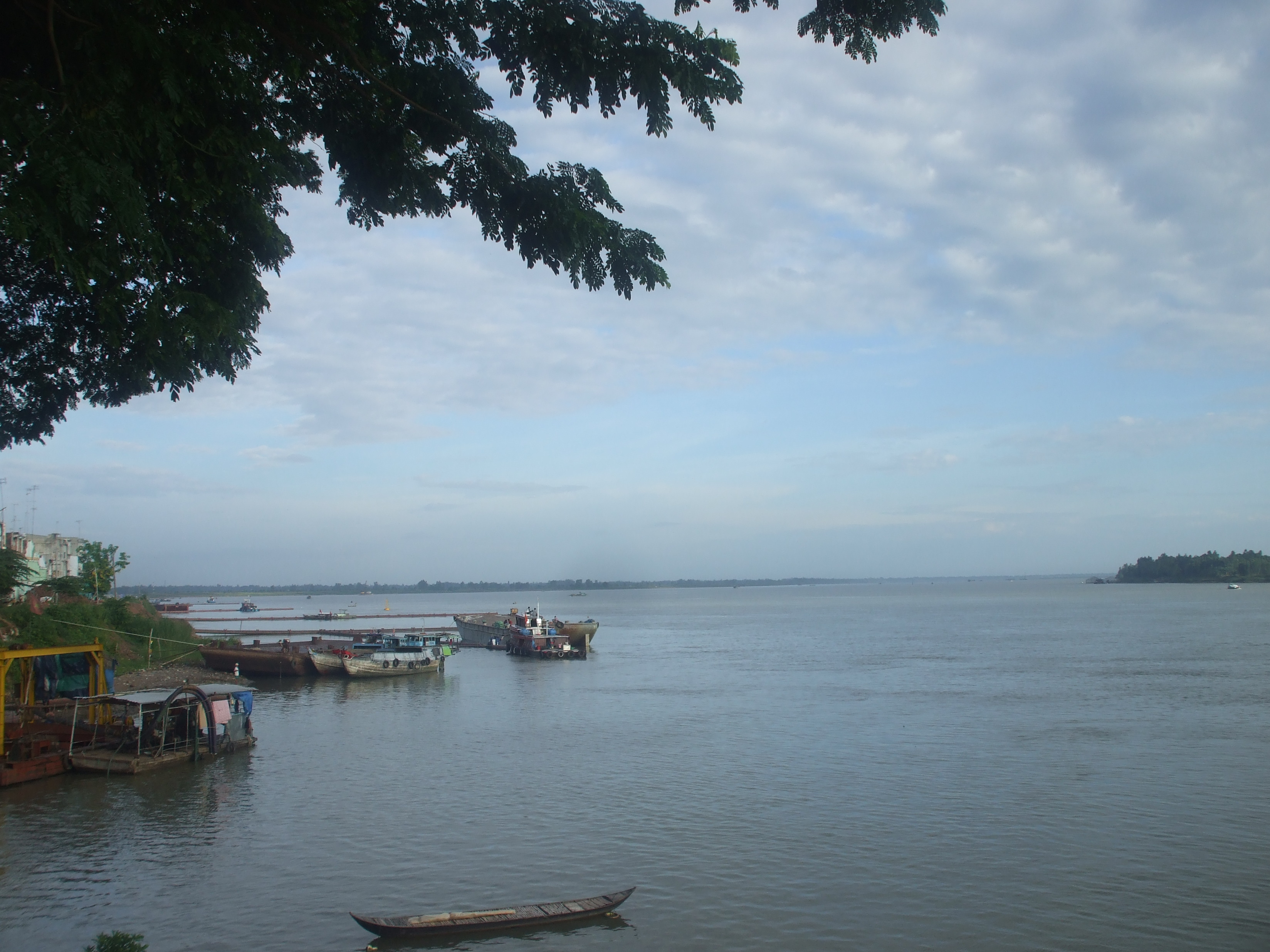
The river Tiền as it flows through Tân Châu (An Giang)

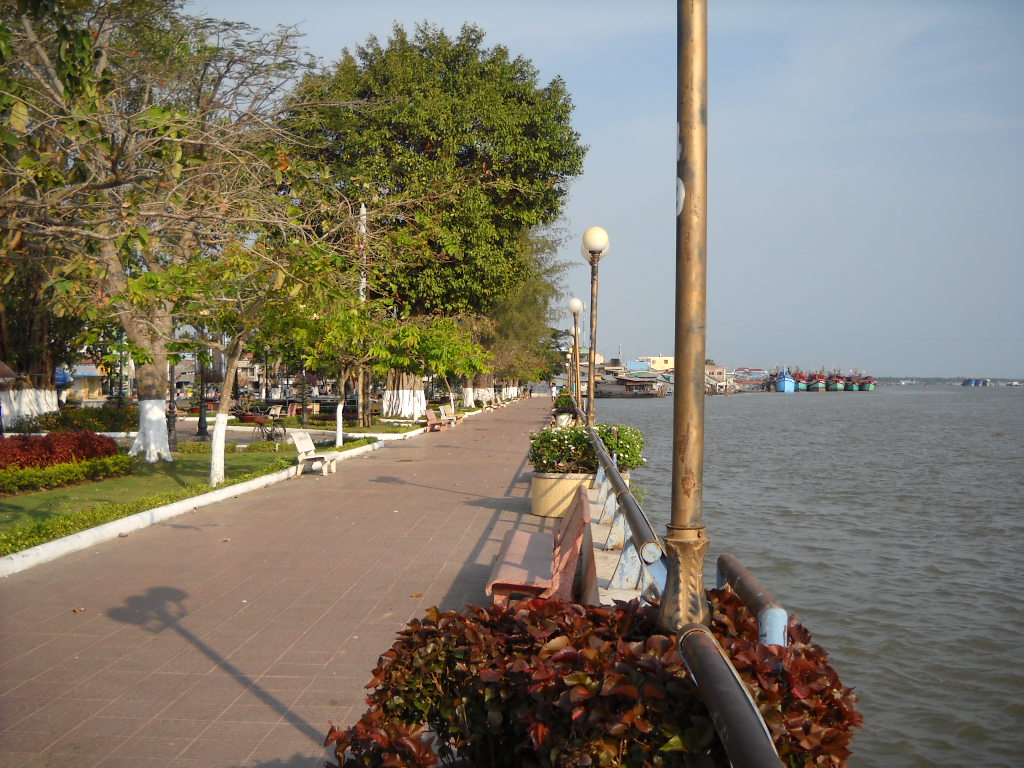
River Tiền at Mỹ Tho

The Tiền River (Vietnamese: Sông Tiền 瀧前 or Tiền Giang 前江) is the name given to the section of the Mekong’s mainstream in Vietnam.

At Phnom Penh, the Bassac River branches off from Mekong River. Both Mekong and the distributary Bassac then flow towards the Cambodia–Vietnam border. After entering Vietnam, Mekong is known as the Tiền River (or Fleuve Antérieur in French, meaning "prior river") while Bassac is known as the Hậu River (Vietnamese: Sông Hậu/Hậu Giang or French: Fleuve Postérieur, meaning "posterior river").

In Vietnam, distributaries of the Tiền River include the Cổ Chiên River, the Hàm Luông River, the Ba Lai River and the Mỹ Tho River.
