= Phú Túc, Vĩnh Long =

Phú Túc Phường Phú Túc
- Ward
- Phú Túc ward
- Location within Vietnam
- Coordinates: 10°18′19″N 106°21′23″E
- Country: Vietnam
- Region: Mekong Delta
- Province: Vĩnh Long
- Time zone: UTC+7 (UTC + 7)

Phú Túc is a ward (phường) of Vĩnh Long Province, Vietnam.
