= Mỹ Tho River =

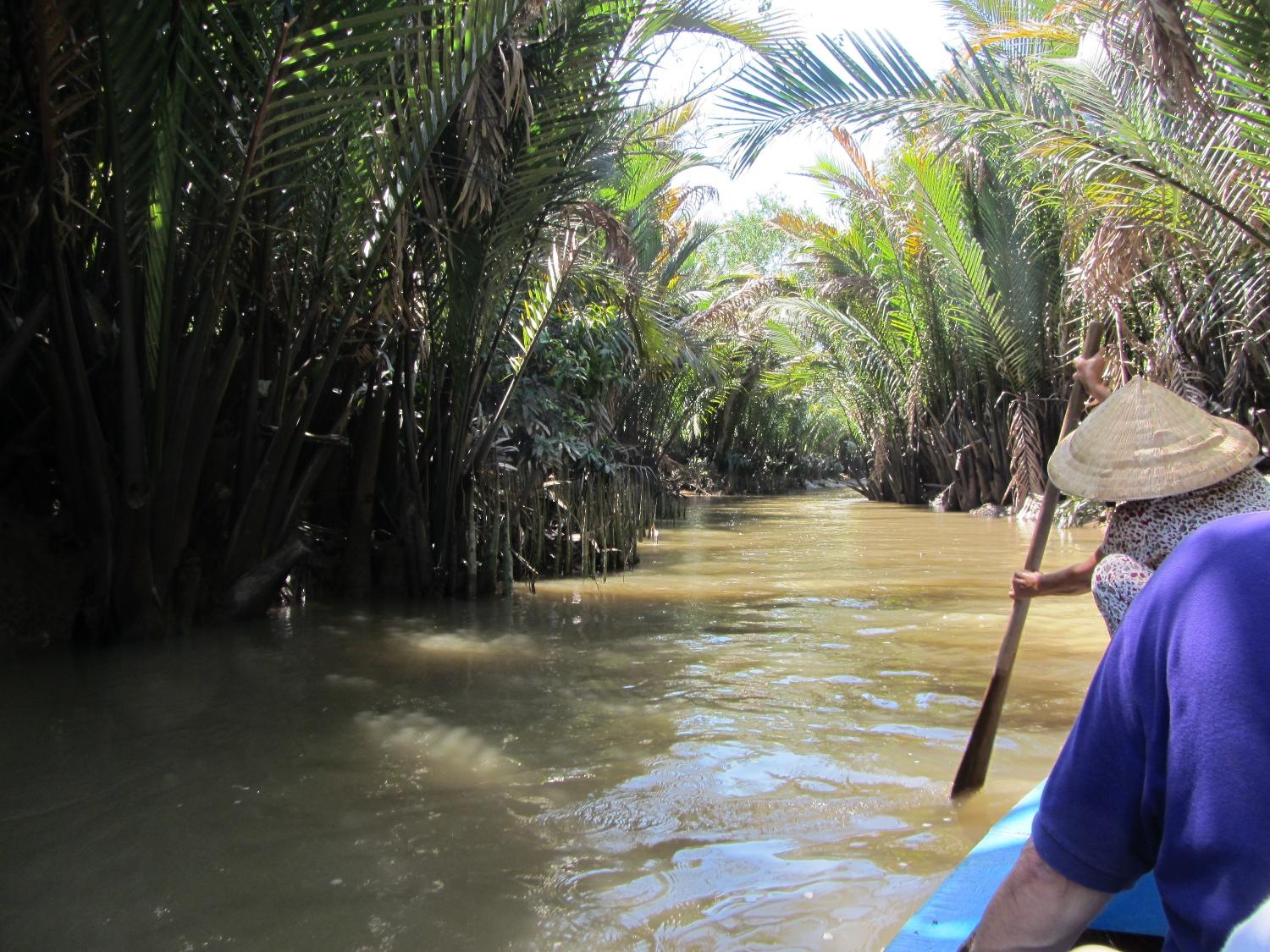
- Canal ride on Thoi Son Island on the My Tho River
- Native name: Sông Mỹ Tho (Vietnamese)

Location
- Country: Vietnam

Physical characteristics
- Source
  - location: Mekong River
- Length: 45.3 km (28.1 mi)

The Mỹ Tho River (Vietnamese: Sông Mỹ Tho) is a river of Vietnam. It flows for 45.3 kilometres (28.1 mi) through Vĩnh Long province and Đồng Tháp province.

== History ==
The Battle of Rạch Gầm-Xoài Mút took place on this river in 1785.
