= Bến Tre (city) =

- Provincial city (Class-2)
- Bến Tre City; Thành phố Bến Tre
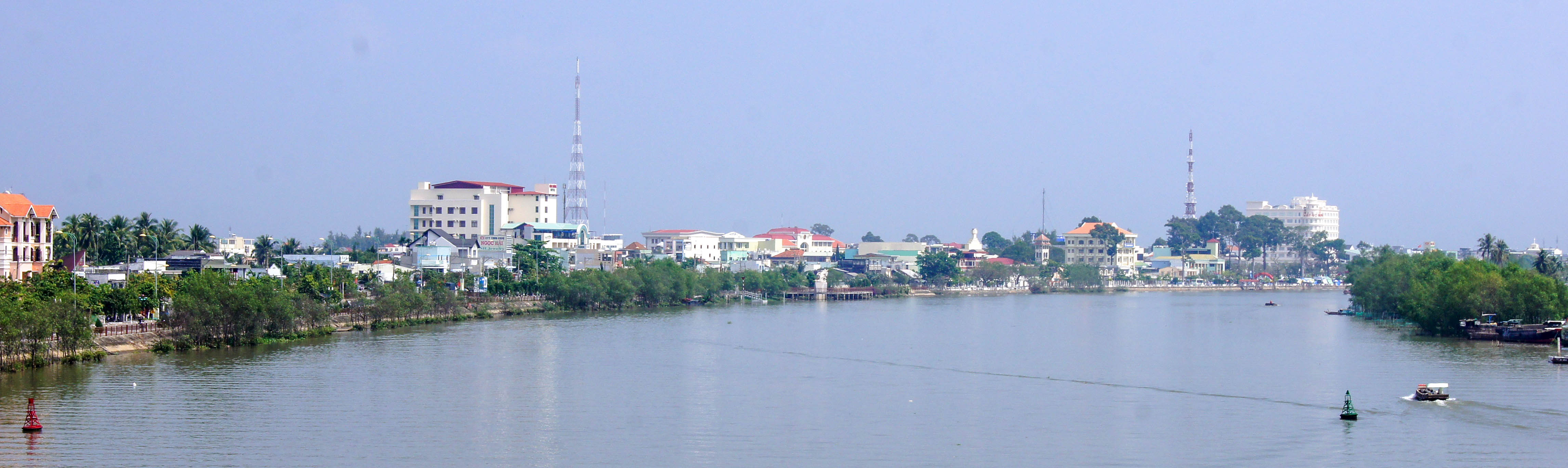
- Skyline of Bến Tre

- Seal
- Interactive map of Bến Tre
- Location of Bến Tre
- Coordinates: 10°14′N 106°23′E
- Country: Vietnam
- Province: Bến Tre

Area
  - Total: 65.75 km^{2} (25.39 sq mi)

Population (2019)
  - Total: 124,449
  - Density: 1,893.52/km^{2} (4,904.2/sq mi)
- Time zone: UTC+7 (ICT)
- Climate: Aw
- Website: https://bentre.gov.vn/

Bến Tre (Vietnamese pronunciation: [ˀɓən˦ˀ˥ ʈɛ˧˧]) is a former city in the Vĩnh Long province in the Mekong Delta region of southern Vietnam. In 2025, the Vietnamese government issued a resolution to merge the former Bến Tre Province with the rest of Vĩnh Long. Located 85 kilometers (53 mi) southwest of Ho Chi Minh City, the city covers an area of 65.75 km^{2} (25.39 sq mi) and has a population of 124,499 at the 2019 census. Bến Tre is connected to the surrounding provinces by the Rạch Miễu Bridge and is also traversed by National Highway 60.

== Etymology ==
The name "Bến Tre" was formed by associating the natural terrain with the name of a tree species (meaning wharf with many bamboos growing). This name has been in use since the Nguyễn Dynasty.

== History ==
=== Early history ===
At the end of the 17th century, the current city of Bến Tre was still sparsely populated. By the following century, many groups of people from Central Vietnam and neighboring provinces began to migrate to this area to settle. In the early days of settling, the inhabitants concentrated on high mounds, along rivers and canals to establish villages easily.

French colonialists occupied the province and established the first Thăm Biến (Inspection) office on the banks of the Bến Tre canal in June 1867. On January 1, 1900, Governor-General Paul Doumer issued a decree to change the Thăm Biến office to a province and established the provincial capital at its current location. Bến Tre has officially been a province since then.

=== 1945-1975 ===
After the August Revolution, the new revolutionary government changed the name of Bến Tre to Đồ Chiểu province with the provincial capital located at An Hội commune. In 1946, it was renamed Bến Tre province again. In early 1948, under the direction of the Southern Resistance Administrative Committee, An Hội commune was to be separated from Châu Thành district and thus the town of Bến Tre was established.

The Viet Minh defeated the French at Dien Bien Phu in 1954 and gained independence under the leadership of Ho Chi Minh and the Communist Party of Vietnam. However, Bến Tre was put under the governance of the Republic of Vietnam and in 1956, that government once again changed the name from Bến Tre to Kiến Hoà province and the provincial capital was renamed Trúc Giang district. The Vietcong on the other hand still uses the name Bến Tre for both the province and the provincial capital. During the Vietnam War's Tet Offensive in 1968, the town was nearly destroyed by bombings in the Battle of Ben Tre.

=== Since 1975 ===
After the unification of the country, the town of Bến Tre, together with the whole province, carried out the work of reconstruction and development of the social, economic and urban spheres. The urban area had backward agricultural economy, small-scale industry and trade; poor economic and social infrastructure, very low per capita income.

After the Đổi Mới reforms of 1986, Bến Tre began to see changes to living standards. Especially since the Resolution 07-NQ/TU of the Provincial Party Committee dated January 30, 2002 on "Promoting urban development of the town Bến Tre from 2002-2005 and orientation towards 2010", the town Party Committee made efforts to overcome difficulties, took advantage of opportunities, focused on socio-economic development, and renovated and built urban technical infrastructure, changing the appearance of the town significantly. In 2009, Bến Tre town officially became a city.

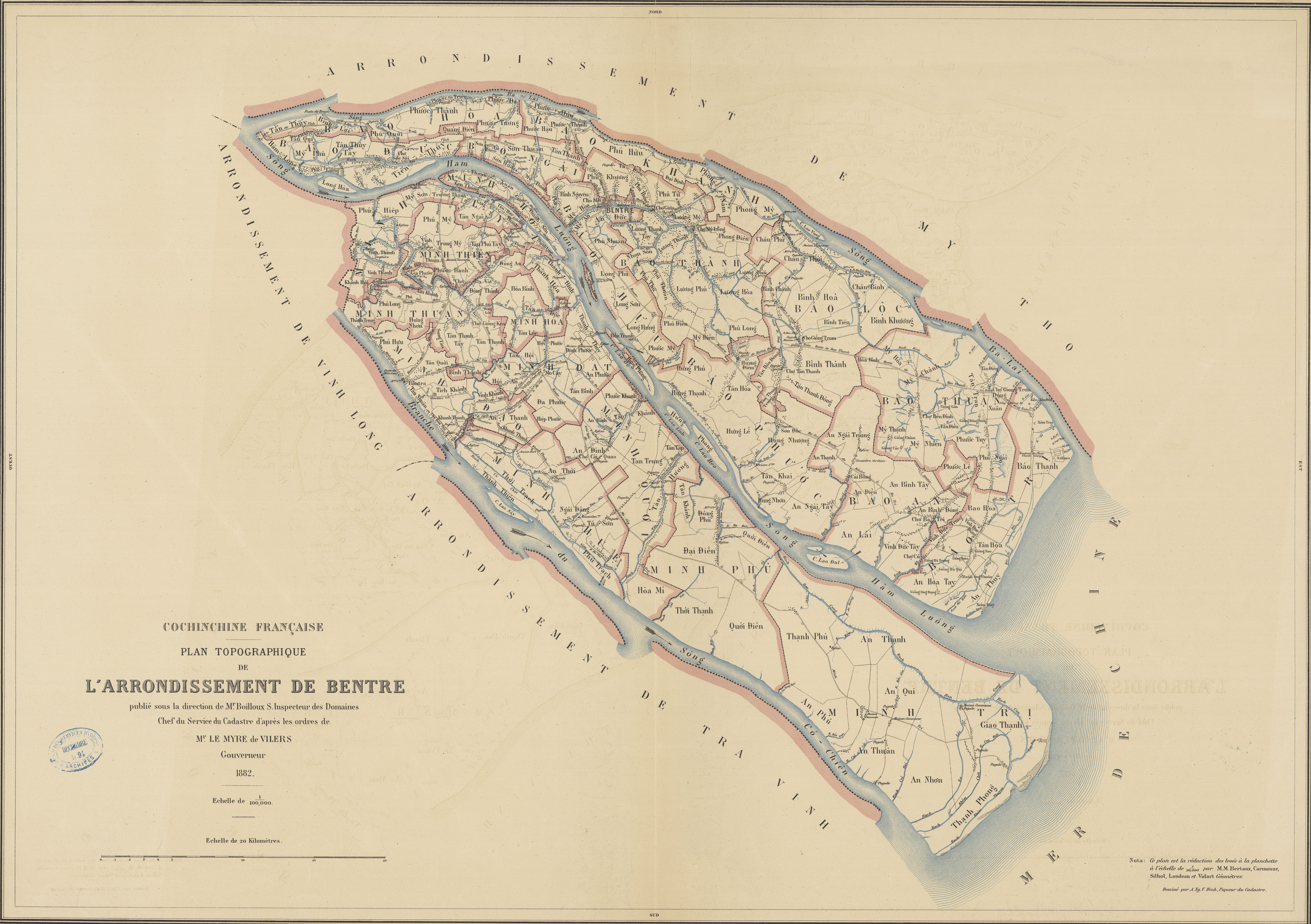
Map of Bến Tre in 1882.

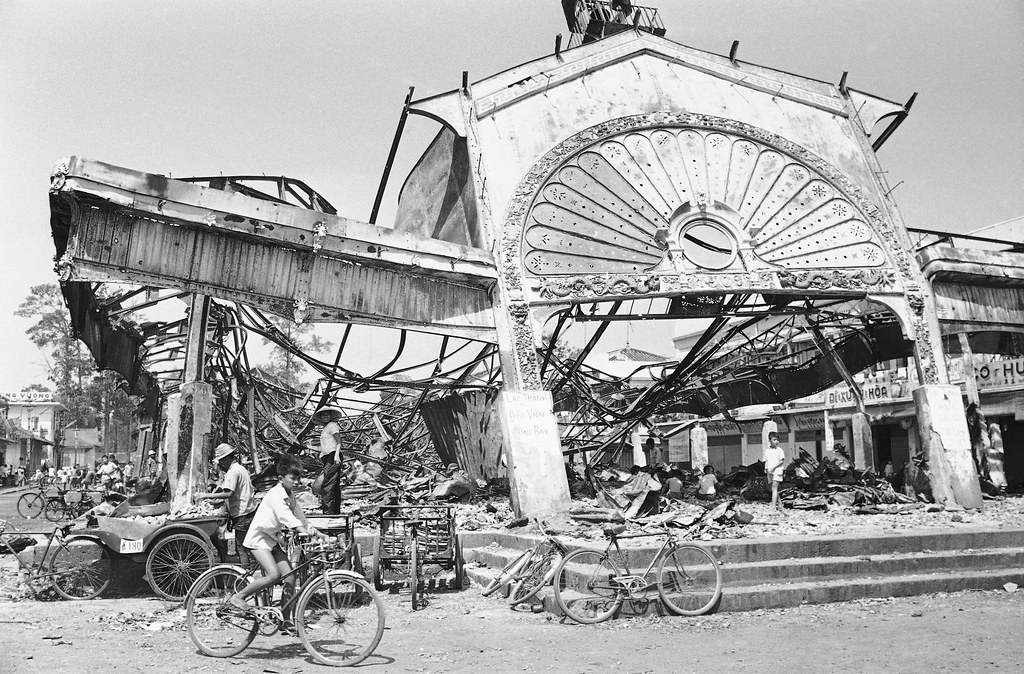
Bến Tre Market after the Tet Offensive in 1968.

== Climate ==
Located in an area affected by the tropical monsoon climate, hot and humid all year round, with a relatively high temperature, the average annual air temperature is 27 °C (81 °F). The average air humidity is from 83 to 90%. During the year, the climate is divided into two distinct seasons: the rainy season from May to November, the dry season from December to April of the following year. The average annual rainfall is 1,210-1,500 mm/year; rainfall is unevenly distributed between the months of the year, in the rainy season rainfall accounts for 94-98% of the total annual rainfall.

== Geography ==
Bến Tre is located on Bảo Island in the Mekong Delta and borders with the districts of Châu Thành, Giồng Trôm and Ba Tri. The city is arranged in a triangular layout and is bordered by the following:

- North and East by Châu Thành district.
- South by Giồng Trôm district.
- West by Hàm Luông River, separating the city from Mỏ Cày Bắc district.

The city has a relatively flat terrain with a dense system of canals, an average elevation of 1-1.5m above sea level; it is an alluvial land on low ground surrounded by the Hàm Luông River to the West, Bến Tre River to the South, and Chẹt Sậy Canal to the East. In the inner city area, there are Cái Cá Canal, Cá Lốc Canal, Kiến Vàng Canal and Gò Đàng Canal.

== Administration ==
The city of Bến Tre has eight wards — 4, 5, 6, 7, 8, An Hội, Phú Khương and Phú Tân — and six communes — Bình Phú, Mỹ Thạnh An, Nhơn Thạnh, Phú Hưng, Phú Nhuận and Sơn Đông.

The Party Committee's Congress of Bến Tre city elected Nguyễn Văn Tuấn as Secretary and an Executive Committee of 40 members for 2020-2025.

== Economy ==
Ben Tre's economy is shifting towards a reduced proportion of agriculture and an increase in industry and services, aligning with modernization goals. Specifically: the agriculture, forestry, and fishery sector accounts for 33.79%; the industrial and construction sector accounts for 20.76%; the service sector accounts for 41.93%; and product taxes less product subsidies account for 3.52%. (2023 structure: agriculture, forestry, and fishery sector was 34.46%; industrial and construction sector was 20.20%; services were 41.76%; and product taxes less product subsidies were 3.57%). The estimated GRDP per capita in 2024 is 56.8 million VND per person, a 9.16% increase compared to 2023.

== Tourism ==
Tourism activities in Bến Tre include visits to coconut candy workshops in Mỏ Cày, Châu Thành, and Cồn Phụng. Visitors can participate in boat trips along canals, cycling through coconut growing areas and visits to rural communities.

== Education ==
- Bến Tre High School for the Gifted
- Nguyen Dinh Chieu High School

== Notable people ==
- Chân Không - Buddhist nun who worked closely with Zen master Thích Nhất Hạnh for more than fifty years
- Nguyễn Phương Khánh - Miss Earth 2018 winner

== Gallery ==
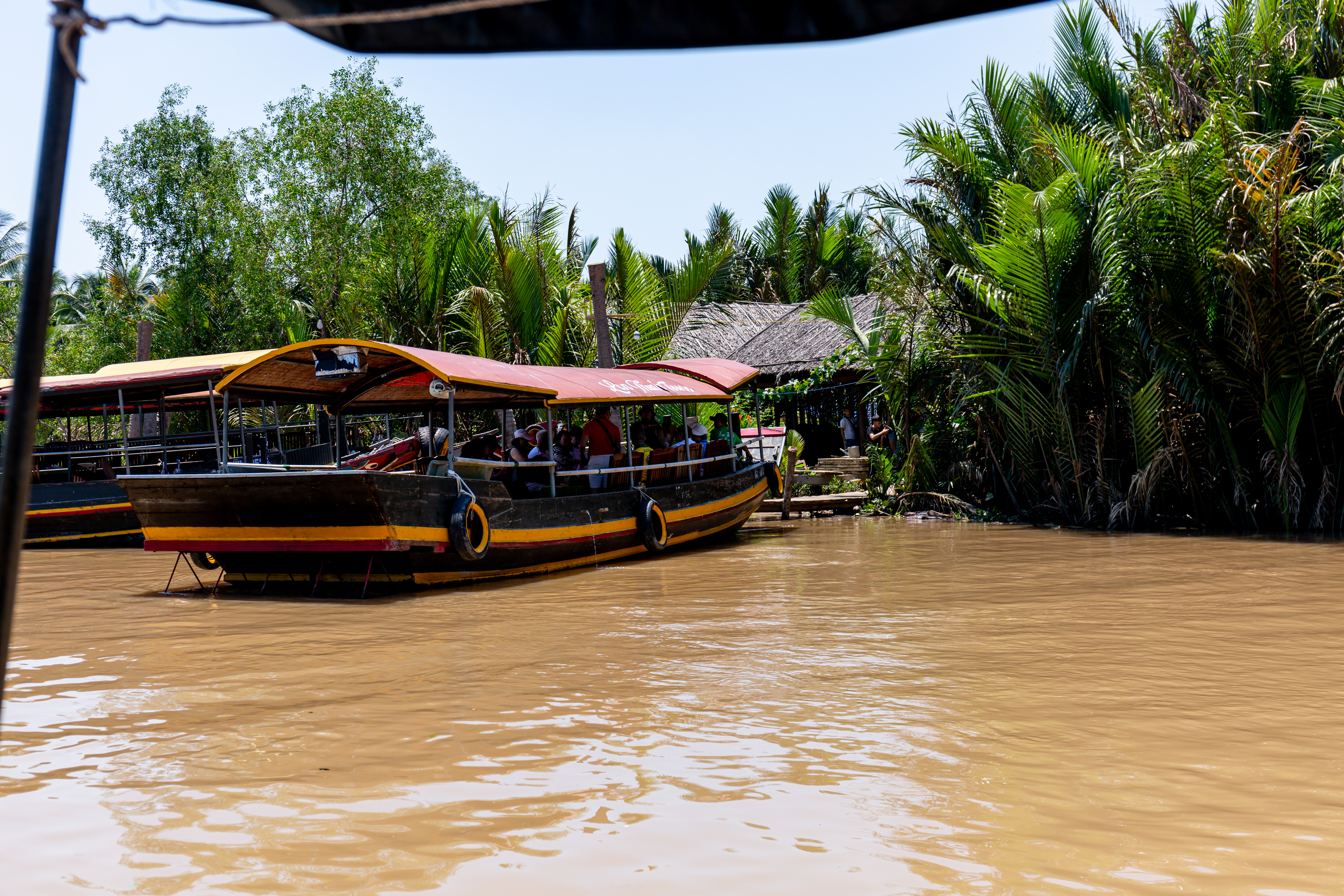
Tourist boat on the Bến Tre River.

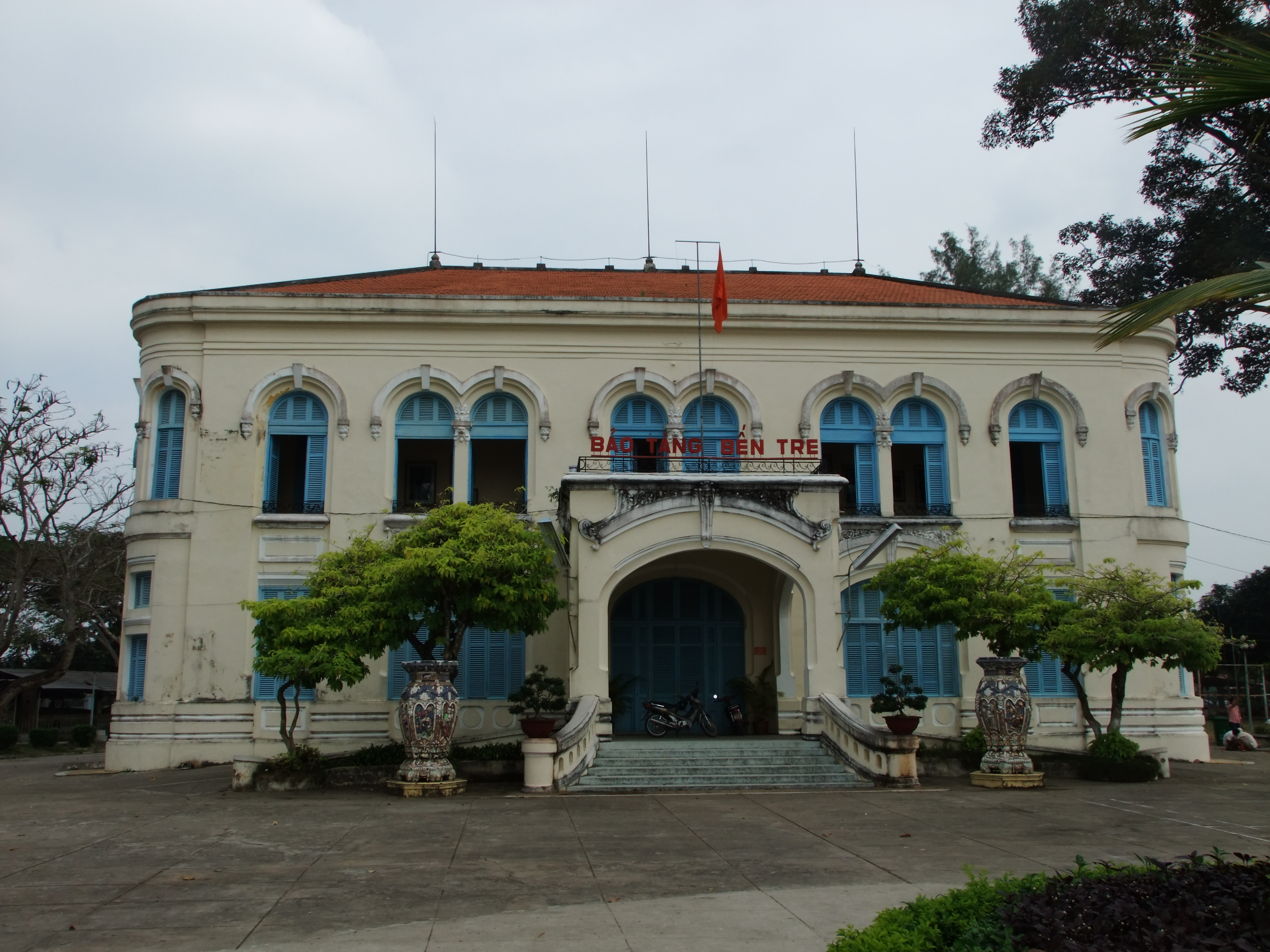
Bến Tre Museum

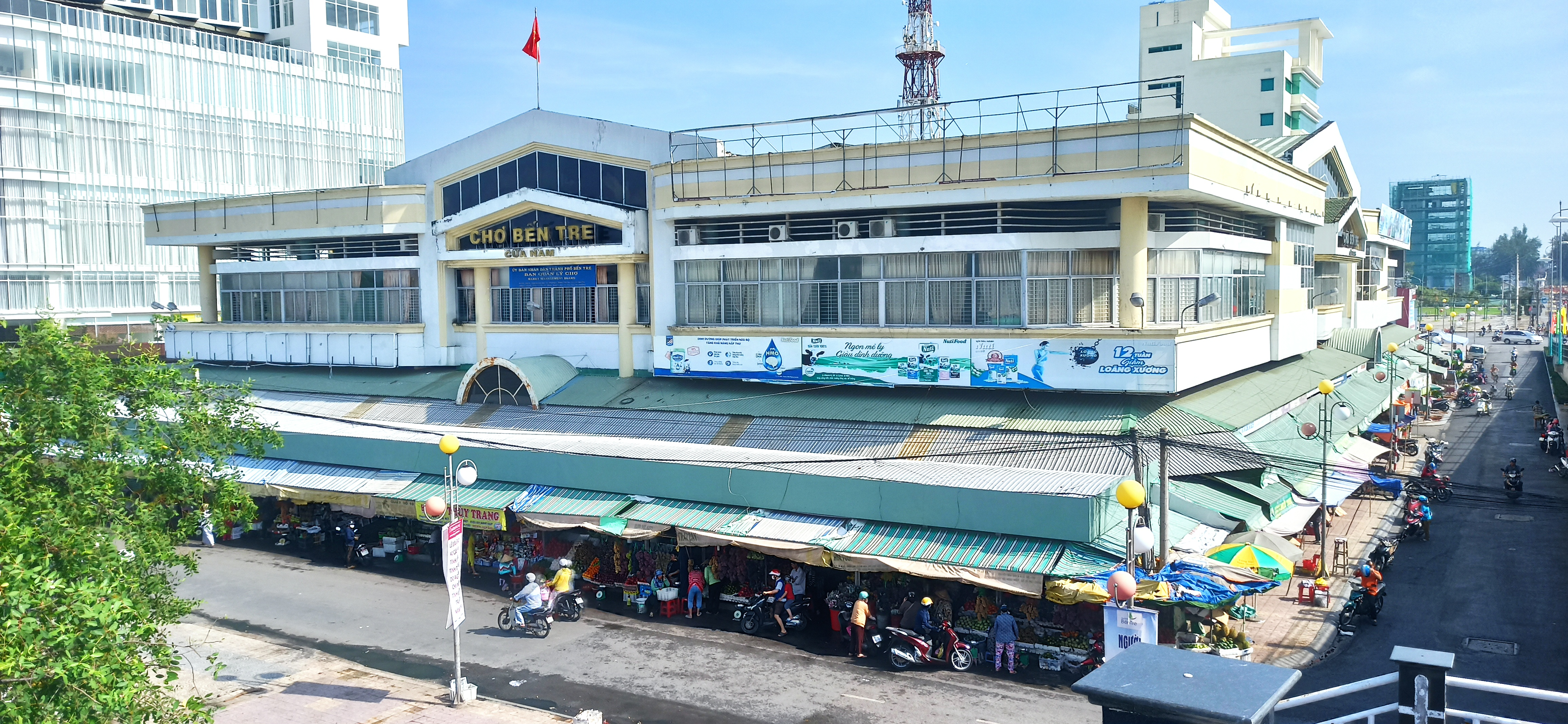
Bến Tre Market

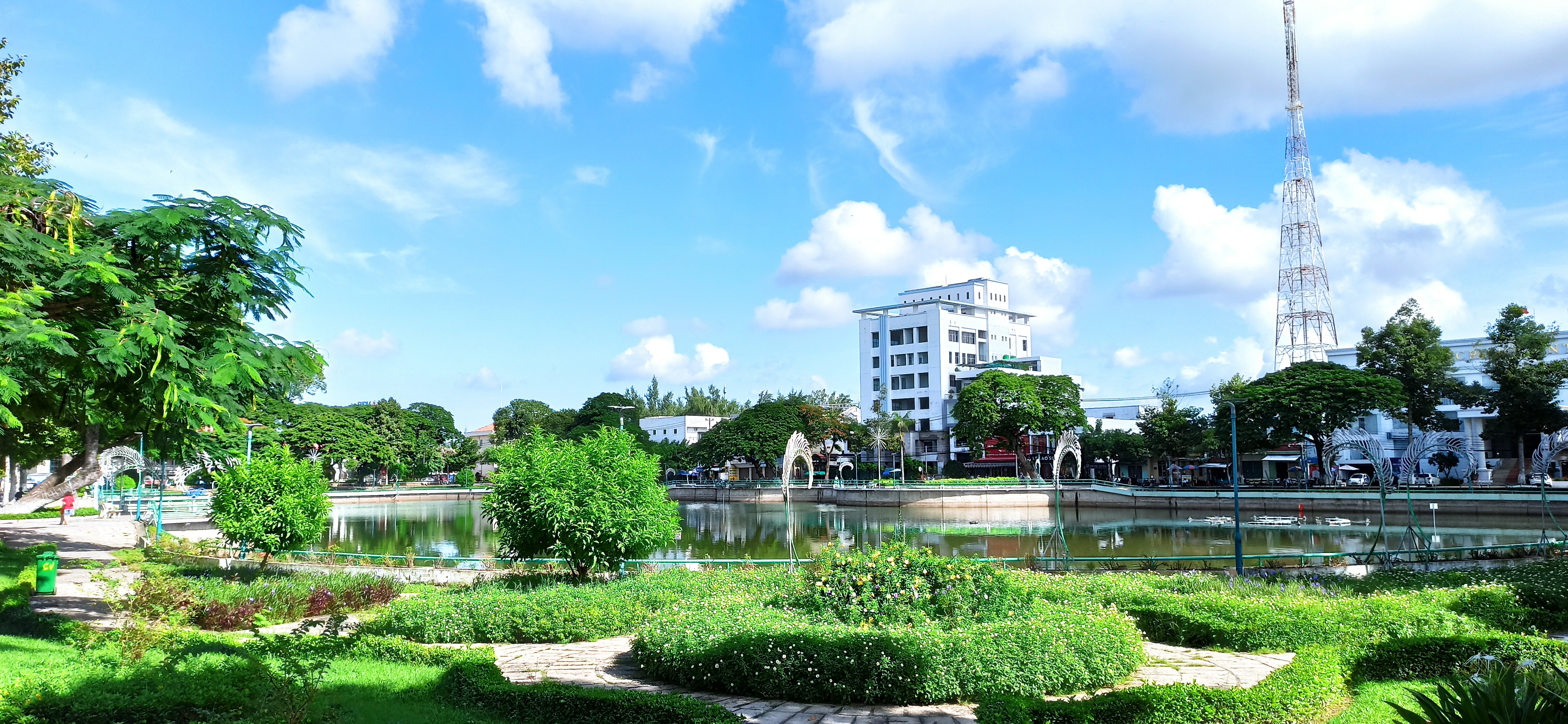
Trúc Giang Lake
