= Hồ Hảo Hớn =

Vietnamese activist

Hồ Hảo Hớn (15 October 1926 – October 1967) was a Vietnamese activist, former member of the Saigon – Gia Định Party Committee, the first Communist Party secretary of Saigon – Gia Định during the Vietnam War. Hớn was awarded the title Hero of the People's Armed Forces.

== Biography ==
Hớn was born on 15 October 1926 in Thạnh Tây hamlet, Hương Mỹ commune, Mỏ Cày district, but his native village was Hòa hamlet, Đại Điền commune, Thạnh Phú district. His maternal grandparents were well off, had lands, his father spend most of their money for the children's education.

Around 1939, Hớn was educated at My Tho College. In 1943, he went to Saigon to study in Lycee Petrus Ky. Graduating from the Baccalaureate in 1945, he returned to his hometown of Hương Mỹ in May, joining the Vanguard Youth and taking over the August Revolution.

After the Geneva Accords (1954) was signed, Hớn was assigned to stay in the South and continue to operate in Saigon for intellectual work with nickname Nguyen Van Chieu. He taught at private schools such as the Vietnamese school, Chu Mạnh Trinh, Nguyễn Huệ ... in Saigon, Binh Duong, Mỹ Tho and Gò Công, Influenced students at that time.

In September 1967, Hớn was sent to the base to attend the Executive Committee of the Party Committee, preparing for the mission in 1968 with Quang Trung Resolution. In October 1967, on the way back to Saigon, due to a briefing by a director, Hớn was arrested by Saigon authorities. After being sent to detention at Bà Hòa Pier (District 5), he died in an ambiguous situation.

== Legacy ==
His name is set for many schools and streets in Vietnam. In addition, there is an award named after him for the scientific work, and the excellent delegation in Ho Chi Minh City.
