= Hàm Luông River =

River in Vietnam

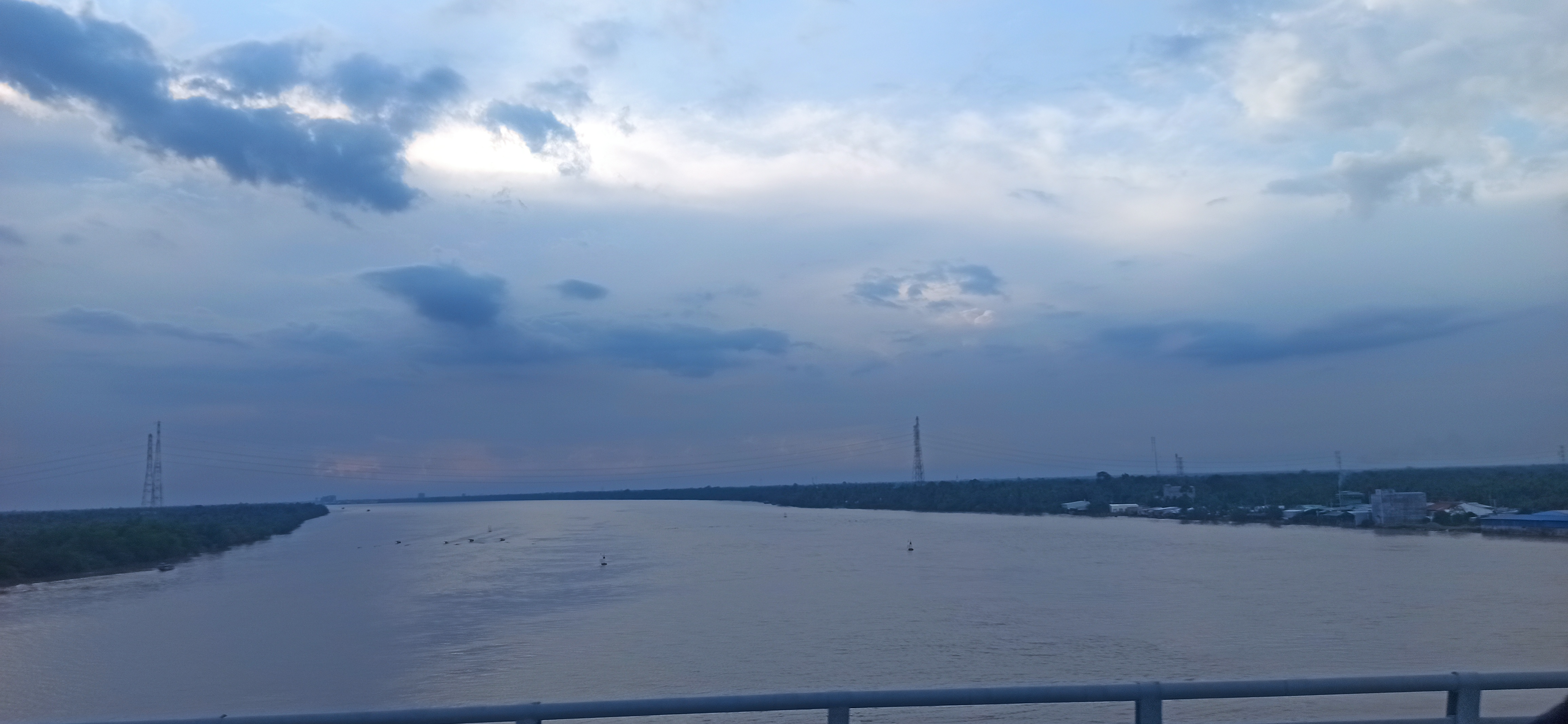
Ham Luong River viewed from Ham Luong Bridge

The Hàm Luông River (Vietnamese: Sông Hàm Luông) is a branch of Mekong River in the Mekong Delta region, Vietnam. It flows for 70 kilometres (43 mi) through Bến Tre Province. It is the border of Châu Thành, Bến Tre, Giồng Trôm and Ba Tri, and Chợ Lách, Mỏ Cày Nam, Mỏ Cày Bắc and Thạnh Phú.

== See also ==
- Ham Luong Bridge
