= Bến Tre =

Ward in Vĩnh Long province, Vietnam

- Ward
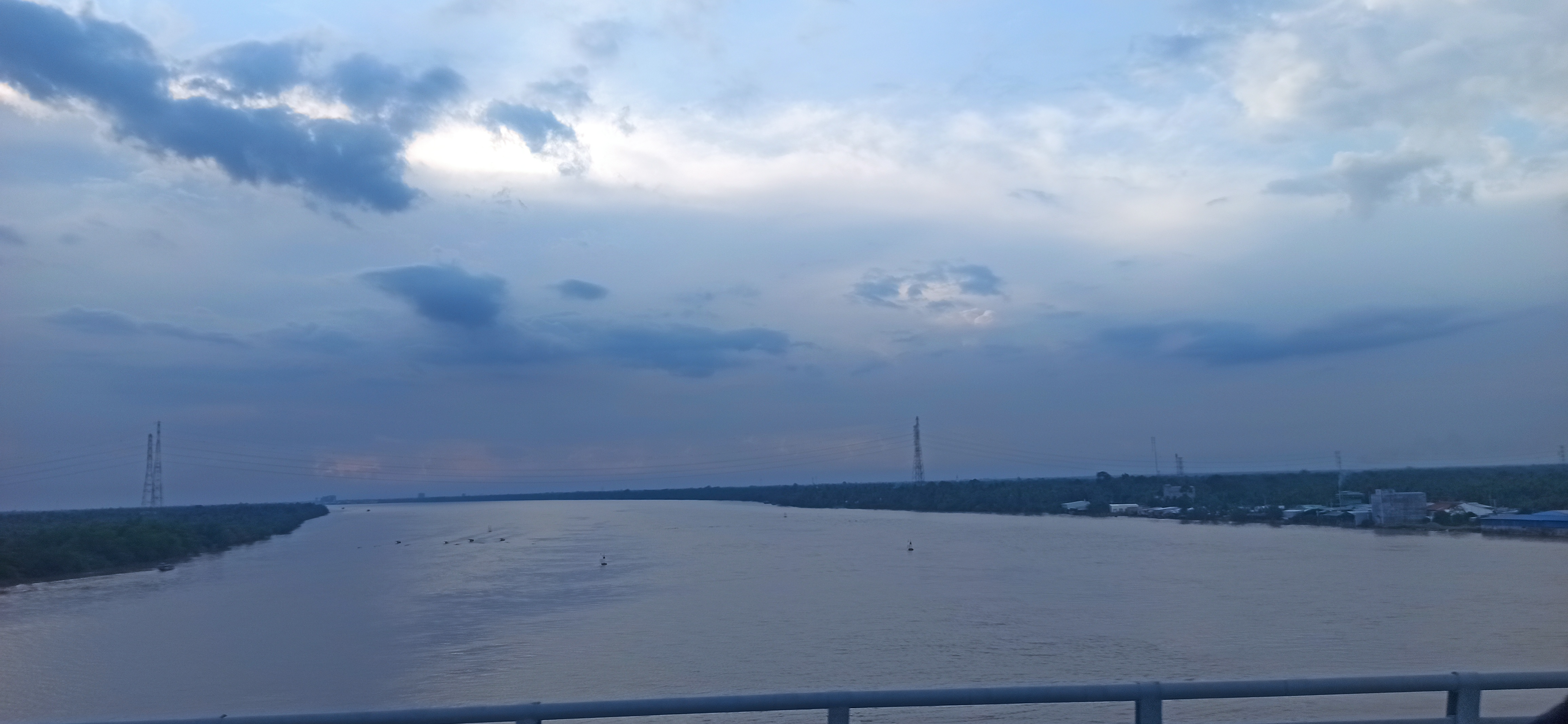
- The Hàm Luông River viewed from the Hàm Luông Bridge.

- Location within Vietnam
- Coordinates: 10°13′51″N 106°19′31″E
- Country: Vietnam
- Region: Mekong Delta
- Province: Vĩnh Long
- Established: June 16, 2025

Government
  - Type: Ward

Area
  - Total: 7.81 sq mi (20.24 km^{2})

Population (2025)
  - Total: 35,917
  - Density: 4,596/sq mi (1,775/km^{2})
- Time zone: UTC+07:00 (Indochina Time)
- Postal code: 28906

Bến Tre is a ward of Vĩnh Long province, Vietnam. The ward covers an area of 20.24 km^{2}. In 1999, the population was recorded to reach 11,051, with a population density of 546 inhabitants/km^{2}.

== Geography ==
Bến Tre ward is a ward situated in the northern part of Vĩnh Long province, located approximately 55 km east of Long Châu Ward and about 50 km north of Trà Vinh ward. It is a ward situated along the banks of the Hàm Luông River and borders with

- To the east, it borders An Hội Ward.
- To the west, it borders Phú Túc Commune, with the Hàm Luông River serving as the boundary.
- To the south, it borders Tân Thành Bình and Phước Mỹ Trung Communes, with the Cái Cấm River serving as the boundary.
- To the north, it borders Sơn Đông Ward. According to Official Dispatch No. 2896/BNV-CQĐP dated May 27, 2025, issued by the Ministry of Home Affairs, following the administrative reorganization, Ben Tre Ward covers an area of 31.99 km² and has a population of 35,917 as of December 31, 2024, resulting in a population density of 0 people/km² (statistical data calculated as of December 31, 2024, in accordance with Article 6 of Resolution No. 76/2025/UBTVQH15 dated April 14, 2025, of the National Assembly Standing Committee).

== Administration divisions ==
Bến Tre Ward is divided into 23 residential quarters: 1, 2, 3, 4, Bình Công, Bình Thành, Bình Thạnh, Mỹ Đức, Mỹ Hòa, Mỹ Tân, Phú Lợi, Tân Thông 1, Tân Thông 2, Tân Thông 3, Tân Thông 4, Tân Thông 5, Thanh Sơn 1, Thanh Sơn 2, Thanh Sơn 3, Thanh Sơn 4, Thanh Xuân 1, Thanh Xuân 2, and Thanh Xuân 3.

== History ==
On February 24, 1976, the Provisional Revolutionary Government of the Republic of South Vietnam issued a Decree on the dissolution of districts and the merger of provinces in South Vietnam. Accordingly, the province of Kiến Hòa was renamed Bến Tre province.

At that time, the area of Ben Tre ward included Mỹ Thành commune (belong to Châu Thành district) Bình Phú, Mỹ Hóa (belong to Bến Tre district-level town) and Thanh Tân commune (belong to Mỏ Cày district).

On March 14, 1984, the Council of Ministers issued Decision 41-HĐBT on the demarcation of communes, towns, and cities in Bến Tre province. Accordingly, ward 7 was established based on the entire natural area and population size of Mỹ Hòa commune.

On August 9, 2007, the Ministry of Construction recognized Bến Tre district-level town as a type III urban area.

On February 9, 2009, the Government issued Decree No. 08/ND-CP adjusting the administrative boundaries of communes and wards to establish communes and wards in Mo Cay district, Cho Lach district, and Ben Tre town; adjusting the administrative boundaries of Mỏ Cày district and Chợ Lách district to establish Mỏ Cày Bắc district in Bến Tre province. Accordingly:

- The district of Mỏ Cày Bắc is established on the basis of the entire natural area and population size of 11 communes of the former Mỏ Cày district: Thanh Tân, Thạnh Ngãi, Tân Phú Tây, Tân Thành Bình, Thành An, Phước Mỹ Trung, Tân Thanh Tây, Tân Bình, Nhuận Phú Tân, Hoà Lộc, Khánh Thạnh Tân and 2 communes of the former Chợ Lách district: Hưng Khánh Trung A and Phú Mỹ.
- The remaining part of Mỏ Cày district was renamed Mỏ Cày Nam district. Mỏ Cày Nam district includes Mỏ Cày town and 17 communes: Định Thủy, Phước Hiệp, An Thạnh, Đa Phước Hội, Thành Thới B, Bình Khánh Đông, Bình Khánh Tây, An Định, An Thới, Thành Thới A, Hương Mỹ, Cẩm Sơn, Ngãi Đăng, Minh Đức, Tân Trung, Tân Hội.
- The remaining Chợ Lách includes Chợ Lách town and the communes of: Hoà Nghĩa, Phú Phụng, Sơn Định, Vĩnh Bình, Long Thới, Tân Thiềng, Vĩnh Thành, Vĩnh Hòa, Phú Sơn, Hưng Khánh Trung B.
- From here, Thanh Tân commune belongs to Mỏ Cày Bắc district district, along with Ward 7 and Bình Phú commune belonging to Bến Tre city, and Mỹ Thành commune belonging to Châu Thành district.

On August 11, 2009, the Government issued Resolution No. 34/2009/NQ-CP on the establishment of Bến Tre city in Bến Tre province. Accordingly, Bến Tre city in Bến Tre province was established on the basis of the entire natural area and population size of Bến Tre town.

On April 5, 2013, the Government issued Resolution No. 49/NQ-CP on adjusting the administrative boundaries of Chau Thanh District to expand the administrative boundaries of Ben Tre City in Ben Tre Province. Accordingly:

- The entire 311.26 hectares of natural area and 2,985 inhabitants of My Thanh Commune in Chau Thanh District were transferred to Ben Tre City.
- From this point on, Thanh Tan Commune in Mỏ Cày Bắc District, along with Ward 7 and My Thanh and Binh Phu Communes, became part of Bến Tre City.

On February 13, 2019, the Prime Minister issued Decision No. 174/QD-TTg recognizing Ben Tre City as a Type II Urban Area (Vietnam).

On January 10, 2020, the Standing Committee of the National Assembly issued Resolution No. 856/NQ-UBTVQH14 on the reorganization of commune-level administrative units in Ben Tre province (the resolution takes effect from February 1, 2020). Accordingly:

- The entire 3.11 km² of natural area and a population of 2,338 people of My Thanh commune are merged into Binh Phu commune.
- After the adjustment, Binh Phu commune has a natural area of 9.66 km² and a population of 9,589 people.

On June 12, 2025, the 15th National Assembly issued Resolution No. 202/2025/QH15 on the rearrangement of provincial-level administrative units. Accordingly, the entire natural area and population size of the provinces of Bến Tre, Vĩnh Long, and Trà Vinh will be rearranged. (Trà Vinh province) becomes a new province named 'Vĩnh Long' province.

On June 16, 2025, the Standing Committee of the National Assembly issued Resolution No. 1687/NQ-UBTVQH15 on the rearrangement of commune-level administrative units of Vinh Long province in 2025 (effective from June 16, 2025). Accordingly, the entire natural area and population size of Ward 7 and Bình Phú of the former Bến Tre along with Thanh Tân of the former Mỏ Cày Bắc district district of the former Bến Tre are arranged into a new ward named Bến Tre ward (Clause 118, Article 1).

== Transport ==
The ward is traversed by National Route 60 and features several bridges, including the Mỹ Hóa Bridge spanning the Bến Tre River, the Hàm Luông Bridge spanning the Hàm Luông River, and both the old and new Cái Cấm Bridges spanning the Cái Cấm River. The Hàm Luông Ferry Terminal was formerly located within the ward but has since ceased operations. The ward also features the Mỹ Hóa Roundabout, situated at the intersection of Nguyễn Văn Tư and Đồng Văn Cống streets.

== Society ==
=== Economy ===
The ward is home to four markets: Binh Phu Market, Ward 7 Market, Thanh Tan Market, and Mien Market.

=== Education ===
Located within the ward are 4 kindergartens, 3 primary schools, and 3 secondary schools, including:

- Binh Phu Kindergarten
- Binh Minh Kindergarten
- Ward 7 Childcare Group
- Thanh Tan Kindergarten
- Binh Phu Primary School
- Ward 7 Primary School
- Thanh Tan 2 Primary School
- My Hoa Secondary School
- Thanh Tan Secondary School
- Tran Thi Lu Secondary School

=== Recreation ===
The ward features two large parks situated along Hung Vuong Street: My Hoa Park, located along the riverbank, and My Hoa Bridge Park, situated at the foot of the Mỹ Hòa Bridge along the banks of the Bến Tre River. The ward also hosts the Phu An Khang tourist complex, located near National Route 60.

=== Healthcare ===
The ward is currently home to the Bến Tre Provincial General Hospital, situated along National Highway 60. With a total investment capital exceeding 1,658 billion VND, construction of the facility officially commenced on December 28, 2024, to serve as a replacement for the overcrowded Nguyễn Đình Chiểu Hospital. The project meets Grade II hospital standards with a capacity of 500 beds and a total construction floor area of over 41,121 m², comprising a 5-story main building dedicated to medical examination and treatment activities.

== Notable persons ==
=== Miss Earth ===
Nguyễn Phương Khánh, Miss Earth 2018
