= Four Holy Beasts =

Four sacred animals in Chinese mythology

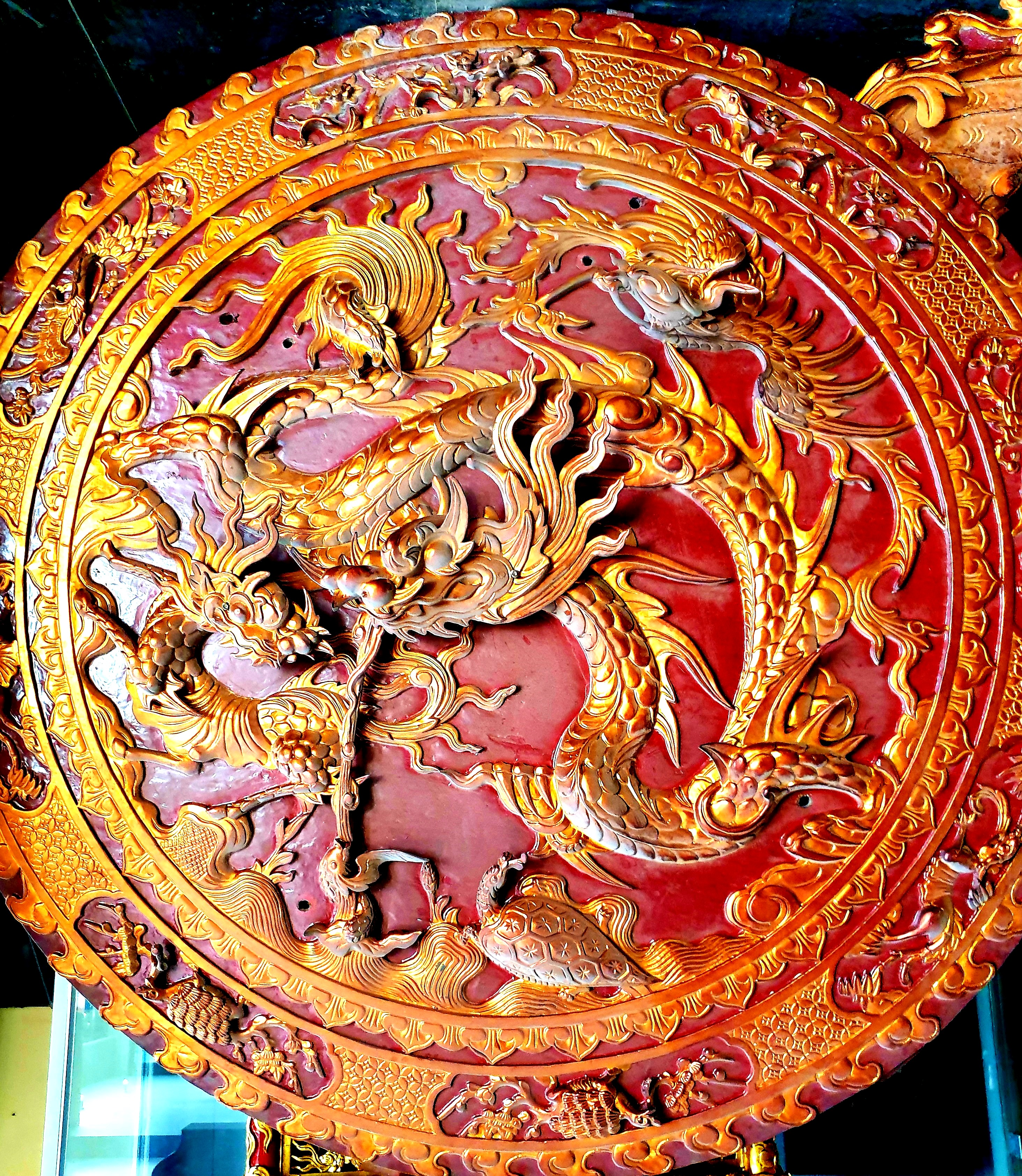
Bas-relief of the Four Holy Beasts at Trần Hưng Đạo Temple, Ho Chi Minh City, Vietnam

The Four Holy Beasts (Chinese: 四靈、四聖獸、or 四大神獸) are Chinese astronomical and cultural Four Benevolent Animals that are spread in the East Asian cultural sphere. They are mentioned in the Chinese classic Book of Rites and includes the Dragon (龍) in the East, the Qilin (麟) in the West, the Turtle (龜) in the North, and the Fenghuang (鳳) in the South.

== Differences ==
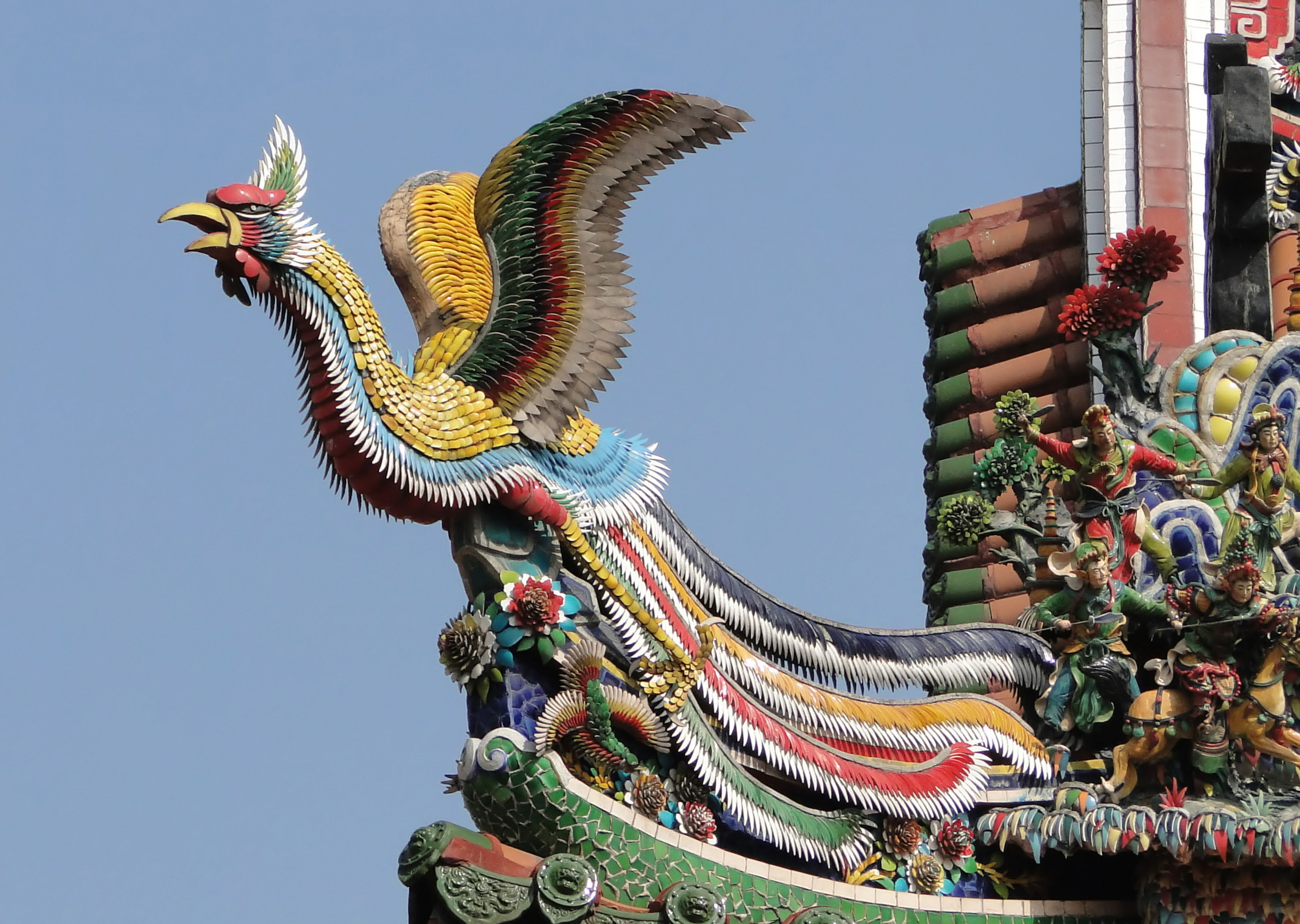
Phoenix depicted at the Longshan temple, Taiwan

The Four Holy Beasts differs from Four Symbols in that Qilin replaces the White Tiger. The Four Symbols are the Azure Dragon (青龍) in the East, White Tiger (白虎) in the West, Vermilion Bird (朱雀) in the South, and the Black Turtle-Snake (玄武) in the North.

== Regional examples ==
=== Vietnam ===
In Ho Chi Minh City, there are four areas named after the beasts in Suối Tiên Park. They are the Thủy Long (水龍) Palace, the Kỳ Lân (麒麟) Palace, the Kim Quy (金龜) Lake, and the Phượng Hoàng (鳳凰) Palace.

In Mekong Delta, there are four islets (cồn) lie nearby on Tiền River are widely known as: Dragon (龍, Long), Qilin (麟, Lân) (part of Mỹ Tho) Turtle (龜, Qui) and Phoenix (鳳, Phụng) (part of Bến Tre).

=== China ===
Summer Palace has statues of the four Beasts.

=== Korea ===
Patterns of the four holy beasts are found in Bronze mirrors of the Goryeo dynasty and Pottery.

== Gallery ==
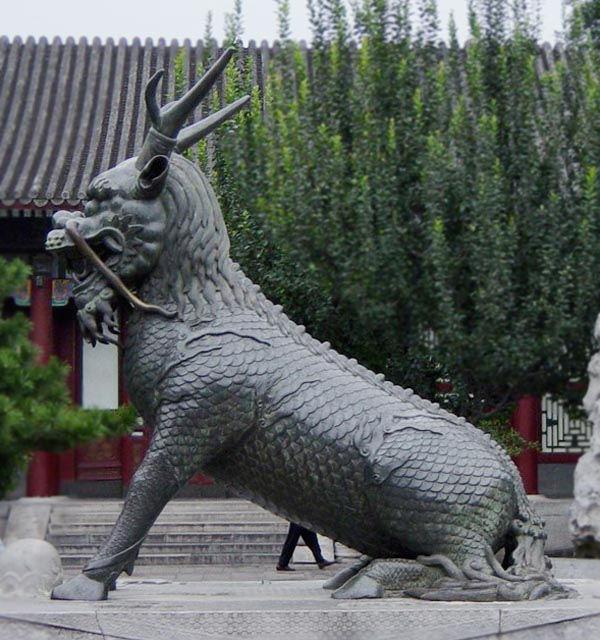
Qilin statue at the imperial Summer Palace of the Qing dynasty.
(麒麟)

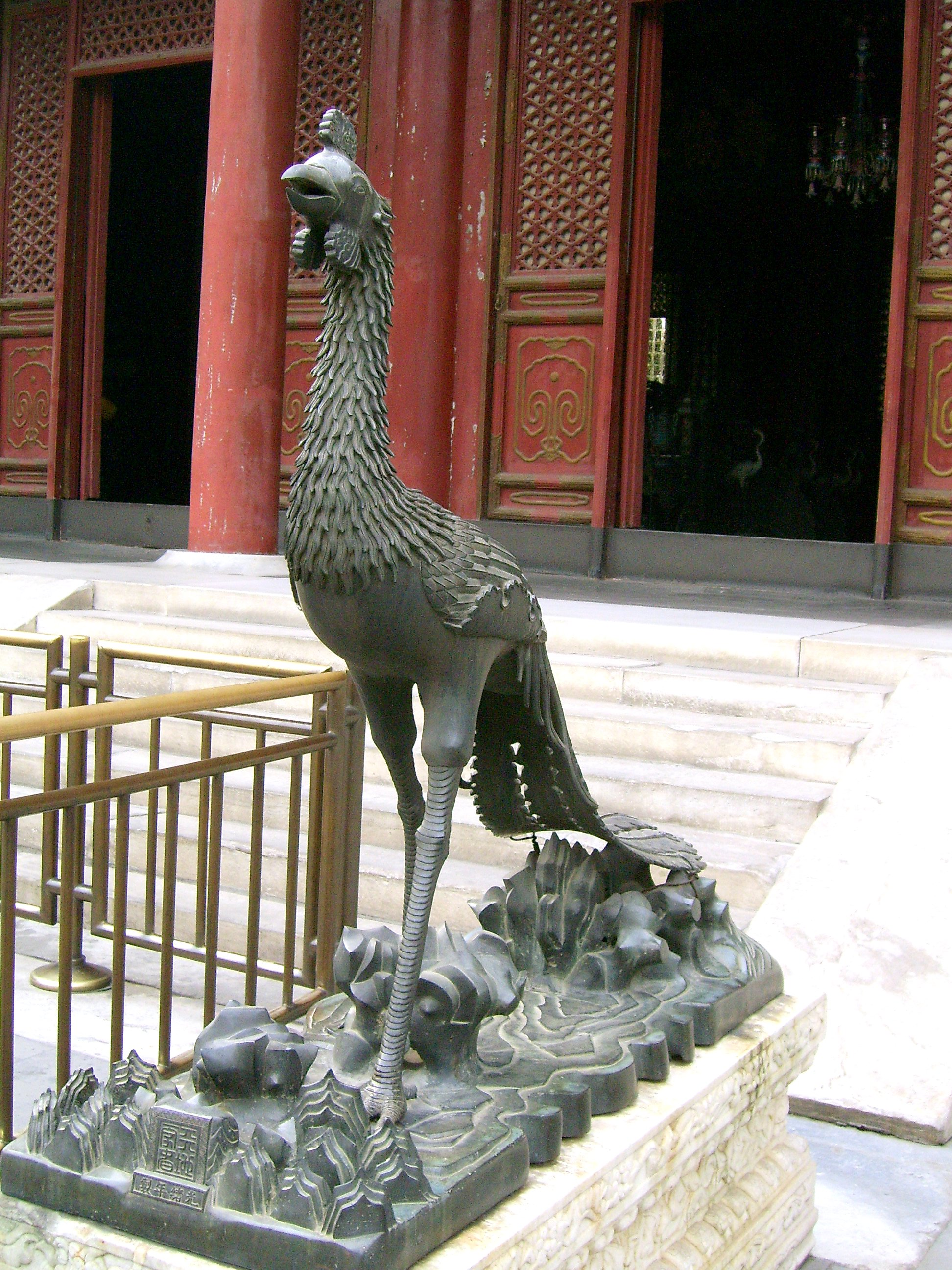
Phoenix
(鳳凰)

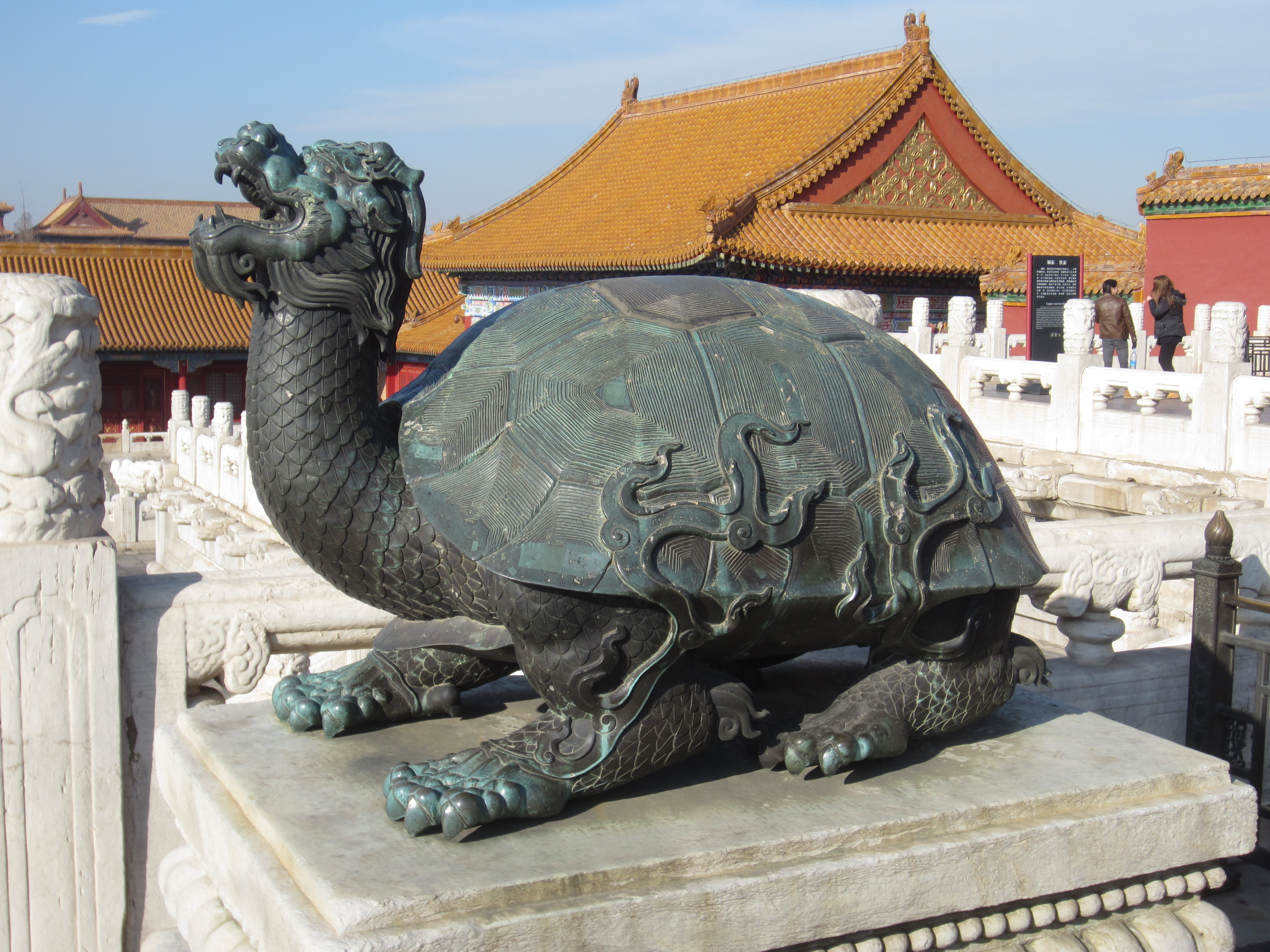
Turtle
(龜)

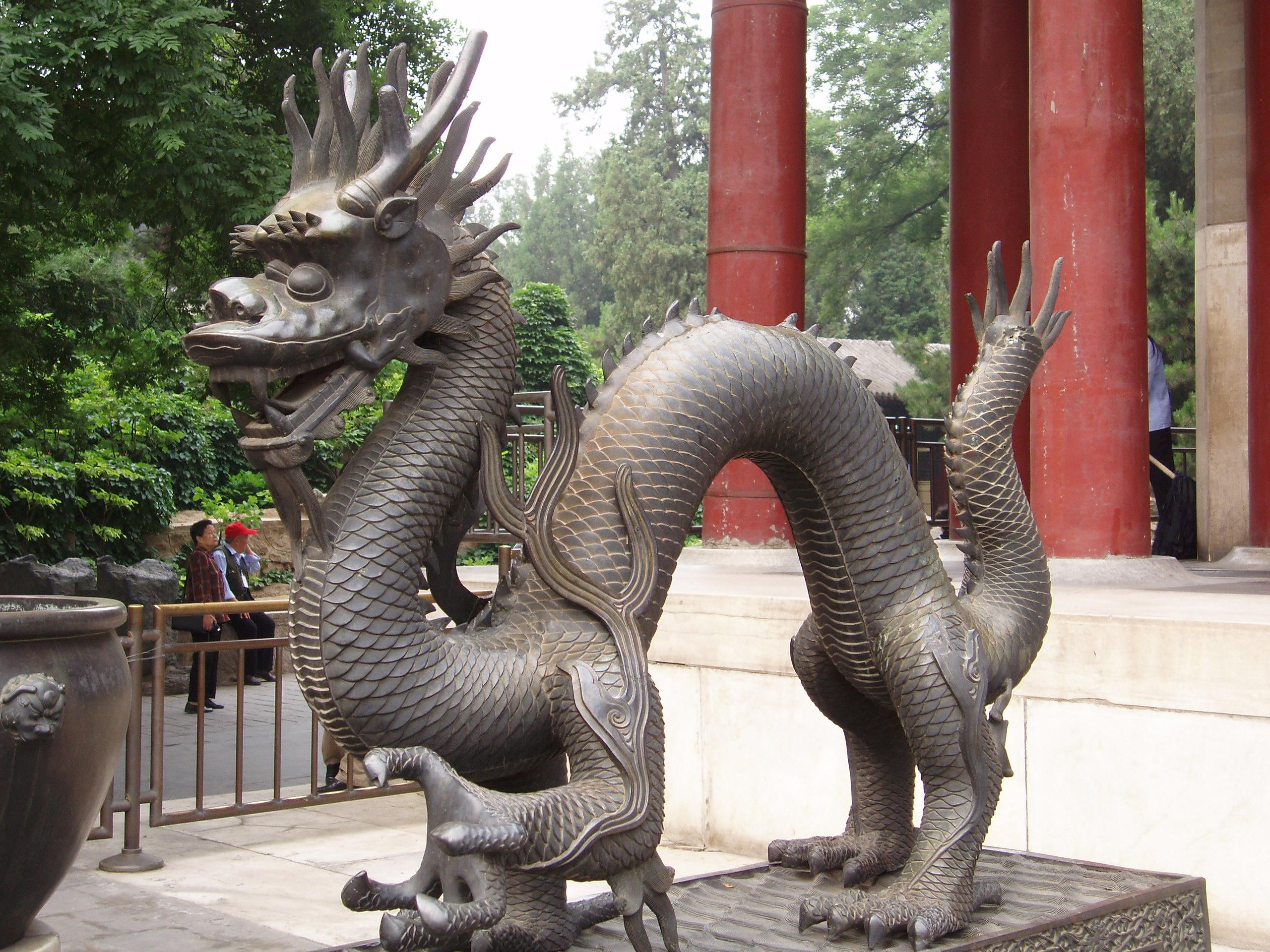
Dragon
(龍)

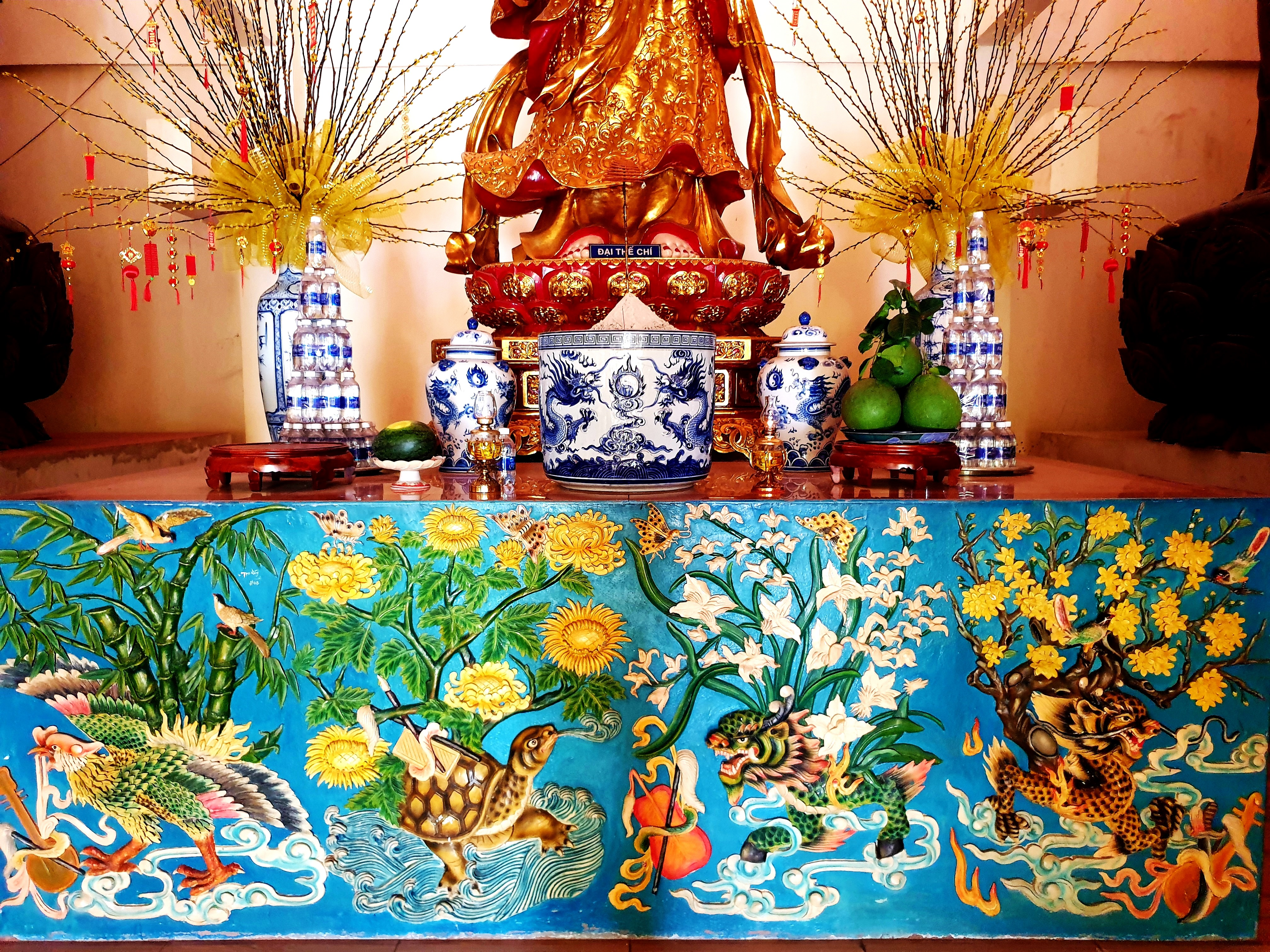
The altar drawing the Four Holy Beasts at Giác Hải Temple

== See also ==
- Four Symbols
- Wudaxian
