= Mỏ Cày =

Mỏ Cày Phường Mỏ Cày
- Ward
- Location in Vietnam
- Coordinates: 10°7′43″N 106°20′00″E
- Country: Vietnam
- Province: Vĩnh Long Province
- Time zone: UTC+07:00

Mỏ Cày is a ward (phường) of Vĩnh Long Province, Vietnam.

Until February 2009, it was the capital of former Mỏ Cày District.
