= Bến Tre River =

River in Vietnam

Coordinates: 10°14′4.5″N 106°23′20.7″E

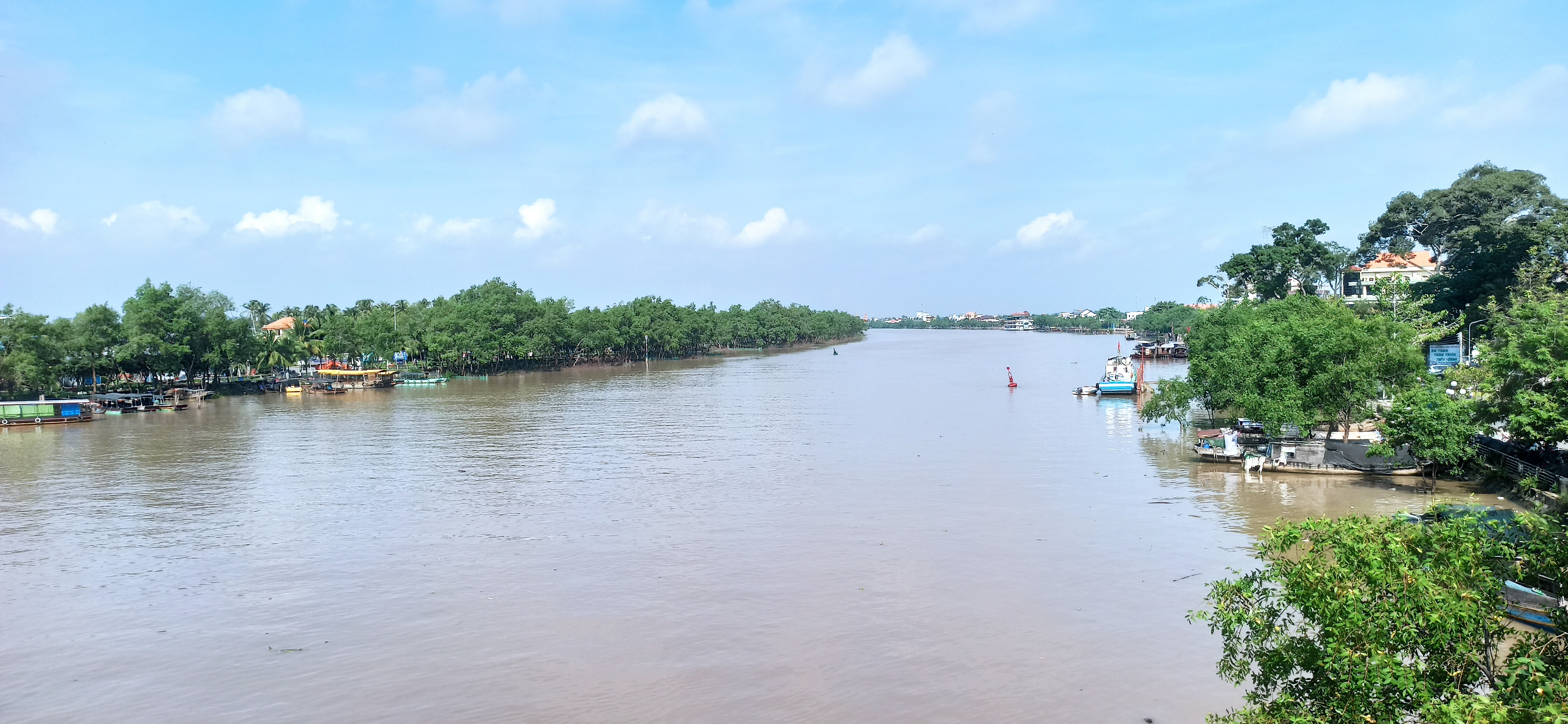
Bến Tre River as viewed from Bến Tre Bridge

The Bến Tre River (Vietnamese: Sông Bến Tre) is a river of Vietnam. It flows for 30 kilometres through Bến Tre Province.
