= Thạnh Phú district =

Coordinates: 9.950°N 106.533°E

Thạnh Phú district Huyện Thạnh Phú
- District
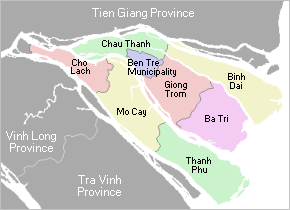
- Location in Bến Tre province
- Country: Vietnam
- Province: Bến Tre
- Capital: Thạnh Phú

Area
  - District: 155 sq mi (401 km^{2})

Population (2019 census)
  - District: 127,841
  - Density: 826/sq mi (319/km^{2})
  - Urban: 9,570
  - Rural: 118,271
- Time zone: UTC+7 (Indochina Time)

Thạnh Phú is a rural district of Bến Tre province in the Mekong Delta region of Vietnam. As of 2019 the district had a population of 127,841. The district covers an area of 401 km^{2} (155 sq mi). The district capital lies at Thạnh Phú.

The district is in the southeast of the province. To the north is the Hàm Luông River and Ba Tri district, to the south is the Chiên River and Trà Vinh province, to the west is Mỏ Cày district and to the east is the South China Sea.

The district capital is on National Highway 57 and is around 45 km southeast of Bến Tre.

== Divisions ==
The district is divided into the following communes:

- An Thạnh
- An Thuận
- Tân Phong
- Thuận Phong
- An Quy
- Hòa Lợi
- Thới Thạnh
- Mỹ Hưng
- Mỹ An
- An Điền
- An Nhơn
- Thạnh Hải
- Đại Điền
- Bình Thạnh
- Phú Khánh
- Giao Thạnh
- Quới Điền
