= Châu Thành district, Bến Tre =

Coordinates: 10°22′N 106°21′E

Châu Thành district Huyện Châu Thành
- District
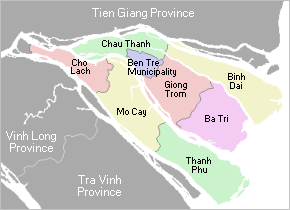
- Location in Bến Tre province
- Country: Vietnam
- Province: Bến Tre
- Capital: Châu Thành

Area
  - District: 88 sq mi (229 km^{2})

Population (2019 census)
  - District: 175,893
  - Density: 1,990/sq mi (768/km^{2})
  - Urban: 4,658
  - Rural: 171,235
- Time zone: UTC+7 (Indochina Time)

Châu Thành is a rural district of Bến Tre province in the Mekong Delta of Vietnam. As of 2019 the district had a population of 175,893. The district covers an area of 229 km^{2} (88 sq mi). The district capital lies at Châu Thành.

The district lies to the north of Bến Tre Province, the Tiên River, the towns of Bến Tre and Mỹ Tho and the districts of Châu Thành and Cai Lậy in Tiền Giang province. To the south is the Hàm Luông River and the Chợ Lách and Mỏ Cày districts.

== Administrative divisions ==
The district is divided into one township, Châu Thành (capital), and the following communes:

1. Tân Phú
2. Tiên Long
3. Qưới Thành
4. Tiên Thủy
5. Phú Đức
6. Phú Túc
7. Thành Triệu
8. Tường Đa
9. An Hiệp
10. Sơn Hòa
11. Tam Phước
12. An Khánh
13. Tân Thạch
14. Phú An Hòa
15. Qưới Sơn
16. An Phước
17. Giao Long
18. Giao Hòa
19. An Hóa
20. Phước Thạnh
21. Hữu Đinh
