= Mỏ Cày Nam district =

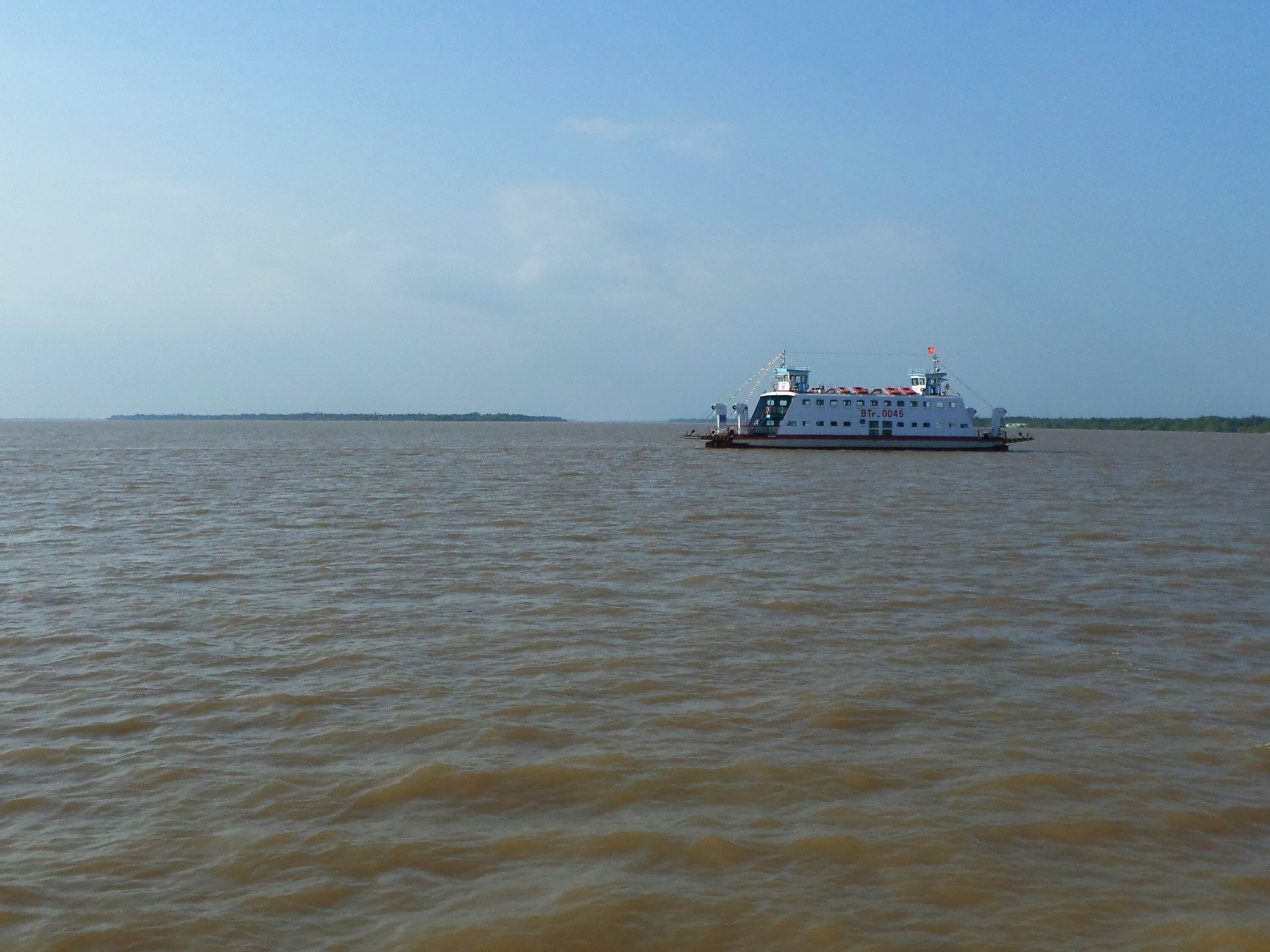
- View of Thành Thới A

- Location of Bến Tre within Vietnam
- Coordinates: 10°10′N 106°30′E
- Country: Vietnam
- Region: Mekong Delta
- Capital: Bến Tre

Government
  - People's Council Chair: Nguyễn Thị Hồng
  - People's Committee Chair: NVõ Văn Út

Area
  - Total: 219.88 km^{2} (84.90 sq mi)

Population (April 1, 2019)
  - Total: 143,577
  - Density: 653/km^{2} (1,690/sq mi)

Demographics
  - Ethnicities: Vietnamese
- Time zone: UTC+7 (ICT)
- Area codes: 75 (until 16 July 2017); 275 (from 17 June 2017)
- ISO 3166 code: VN-50
- Website: mocaynam.bentre.gov.vn

Mỏ Cày Nam is a rural district (huyện) of Bến Tre province in the Mekong Delta of Vietnam. The district was established in March 2009.

Mỏ Cày Nam borders Giồng Trôm district to the east, Mỏ Cày Bắc and Giồng Trôm districts to the north and northeast, Thạnh Phú district to the south and southwest and Trà Vinh province to the south and west.

Mỏ Cày Nam has a population of 186,474 and covers an area of 219.9 km^{2}.

== Divisions ==
This district is subdivided into 1 township (thị trấn) and 16 communes (xã):

- Township: Mỏ Cày (district seat)
- Communes: Định Thuỷ, Phước Hiệp, An Thạnh, Đa Phước Hội, Thành Thới B, Bình Khánh Đông, Bình Khánh Tây, An Định, An Thới, Thành Thới A, Hương Mỹ, Cẩm Sơn, Ngãi Đăng, Minh Đức, Tân Trung and Tân Hội.
