= Mỏ Cày district =

Coordinates: 10.083°N 106.333°E

Mỏ Cày district Huyện Mỏ Cày
- Former District
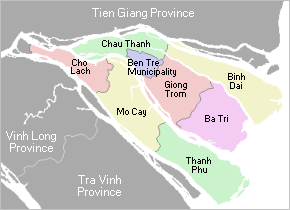
- Location in Bến Tre province
- Country: Vietnam
- Province: Bến Tre
- Capital: Mỏ Cày

Area
  - Total: 140 sq mi (370 km^{2})

Population (2003)
  - Total: 274,265
- Time zone: UTC+07:00 (Indochina Time)

Mỏ Cày is a former rural district (huyện) of Bến Tre province in the Mekong Delta region of Vietnam. As of 2003 the district had a population of 274,265. The district covers an area of 370 km². The district capital lies at Mỏ Cày. It is famous for its coconut candy.

In late March 2009, Mo Cay was split in into Mỏ Cày Bắc district (North Mỏ Cày) and Mỏ Cày Nam district (South Mỏ Cày).
