= Bến Tre province =

Former province of Vietnam (1900 – 2025)

Bến Tre province Kiến Hòa province Trúc Giang province
- Province
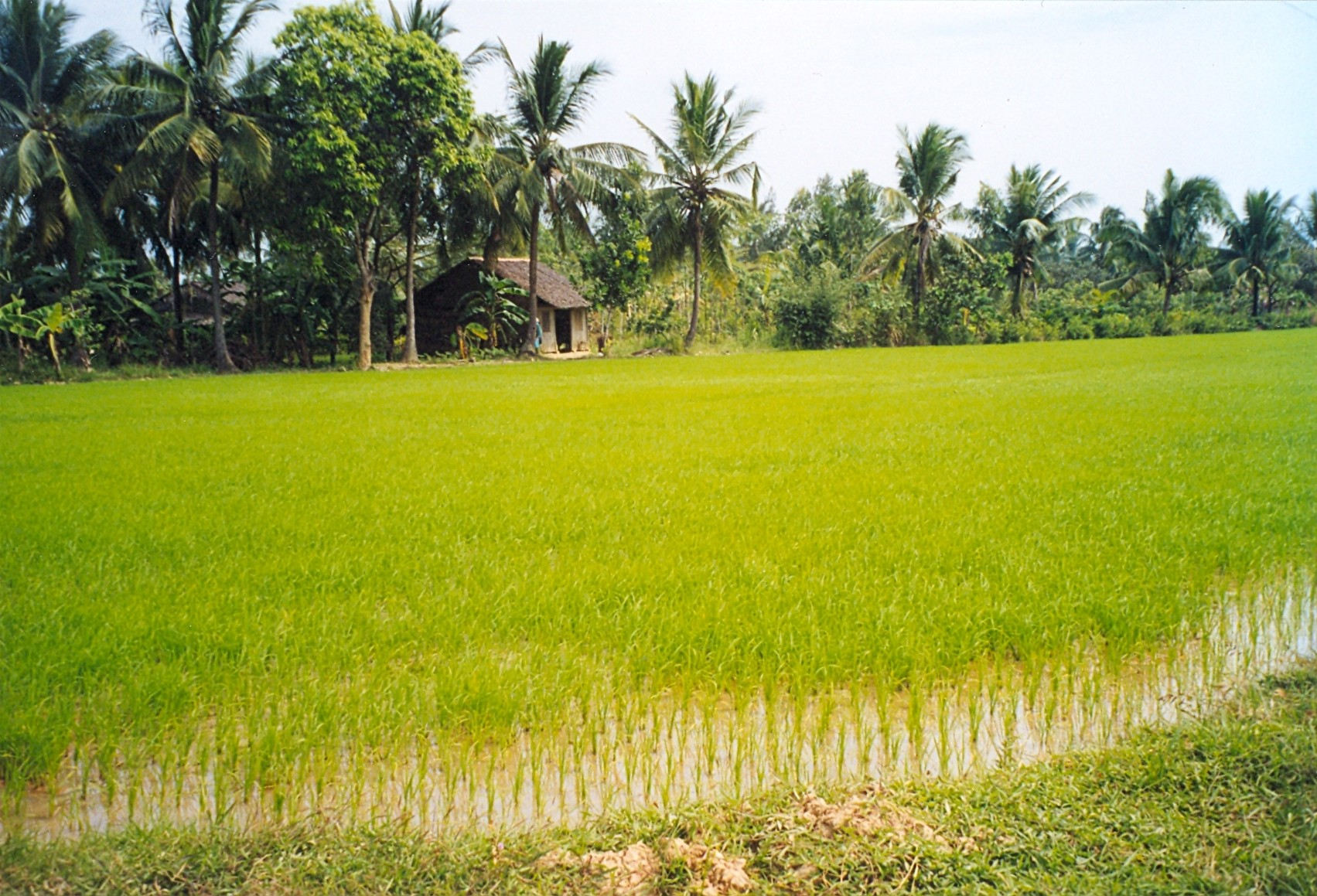
- Bến Tre countryside around Cái Mơn

- Seal
- Nickname: "Coconutland" (Xứ Dừa)
- Location of Bến Tre within Vietnam
- Coordinates: 10°10′N 106°30′E
- Country: Vietnam
- Region: Mekong Delta
- Provincial capital: Bến Tre

Government
  - Body: Bến Tre provincial Party Committee
  - People's Council Chair: Hồ Thị Hoàng Yến (Communist Party of Vietnam)
  - People's Committee Chair: Trần Ngọc Tam

Area
  - Total: 2,379.70 km^{2} (918.81 sq mi)

Population (2025)
  - Total: 1,310,190
  - Density: 550.569/km^{2} (1,425.97/sq mi)
- Demonym: People of Bến Tre

Demographics
  - Ethnicities: Vietnamese, Khmer, Hoa, Chăm

GDP
  - Total: VND 41.851 trillion US$ 1.818 billion
- Time zone: UTC+7 (ICT)
- Postal code: 86xxx
- Area codes: 75 (until 16 July 2017); 275 (from 17 June 2017)
- ISO 3166 code: VN-50
- HDI (2020): ▲0.683 (49th)
- Website: www.bentre.gov.vn

Bến Tre was a former province of Vietnam. It was one of the country's southern provinces, and was situated in the Mekong Delta. It is also famous for its coconuts and the Coconut Religion nationwide. Disconnected from the mainland, the province lies mainly on 2 river islands. It has land borders only with Vĩnh Long Province, which occupies the western tip of the southern river island.

On June 12, 2025, Bến Tre was incorporated into Vĩnh Long province.

== Etymology ==
The origin of the province’s name is still unclear as it was first inhabited by the Khmer people, though some speculated it may have been called Kompong Russei. Its original name was then later altered by incoming waves of immigration and settlement by ethnic Vietnamese into Bến Tre. In Vietnamese, "Bến Tre" literally means "bamboo port", which is quite inaccurate considering it is regionally famous for its coconuts.

== History ==
Since 1757, the land of Bến Tre belonged to Tân An canton, Định Viễn district, under Long Hồ administrative unit. During the reign of Emperor Minh Mạng, the area was part of Hoằng Trị prefecture (comprising Tân Ninh, Bảo An, and Bảo Hậu districts), under Vĩnh Long province. In 1832, An Hóa islet (now part of Bến Tre province) was included in Kiến Hòa district.

In 1867, the French established Bến Tre as a district (hạt). After several administrative changes, it officially became Bến Tre province in 1900. By 1912, the province was divided into four districts: Ba Tri, Sóc Sải, Mỏ Cày, and Thạnh Phú; Sóc Sải was later renamed Châu Thành in 1927. In 1956, the province was renamed Kiến Hòa and expanded to include nine districts.

The revolutionary government continued to refer to it as Bến Tre province. After 1975, there were plans to merge it with other provinces, but it remained a separate province. In 1976, the name was officially changed back to Bến Tre, consisting of one town and seven districts.

In 2009, Mỏ Cày was divided into two districts: Mỏ Cày Bắc (North) and Mỏ Cày Nam (South); Bến Tre town was also upgraded to a city. Today, Bến Tre province has nine district-level administrative units, with Bến Tre city classified as a grade-II urban area since 2019.

On 12 June 2025, as part of major nationwide reforms, Bến Tre province was dissolved and merged with Vĩnh Long province.

== Administration ==
Bến Tre is subdivided into 9 district-level subdivisions. The eight districts are Ba Tri, Bình Đại, Châu Thành, Chợ Lách, Giồng Trôm, Mỏ Cày Bắc, Mỏ Cày Nam, and Thạnh Phú. There is also one provincial city of Bến Tre (capital). They are further subdivided into 7 commune-level towns (or townlets), 147 communes, and 10 wards. To view the list of subdivisions, see List of communes in Bến Tre province.

== Geography ==
Geographically, Bến Tre is wedged between the two main branches of the Tiền Giang River, which is itself one of the two main distributary of the Mekong. The province's northern boundary is formed by the Tiền Giang's main course, while the province's southern boundary is formed by the Tiền Giang's largest branch (which breaks away from the Tiền Giang just upriver from Bến Tre province). Between the Tiền Giang and its main branch are two smaller branches, passing through the middle of Bến Tre. As a result, this province may be considered having 2 main river islands and has land borders only with Vĩnh Long Province on its western tip.

The entire province is criss-crossed with a network of smaller rivers and canals. The extensive irrigation that this provides makes Bến Tre a major producer of rice, but also means that the area is prone to flooding. The Climate Change Research Institute at Cần Thơ University, in studying the possible consequences of climate change, has predicted that 51% of Bến Tre province can be expected to be flooded if sea levels rise by 1 meter. Bến Tre province is, on average, only 1.25 meters (4 ft 1 in) above sea level.

== Transportation ==
Construction on the Rạch Miễu Bridge, which links Bến Tre to neighboring Tiền Giang province to its north, was started in 2002. The bridge was finished and opened for traffic on 19 January 2009. Before that time, Bến Tre was only accessible to automobiles via ferry.

== Notable people ==
- Nguyễn Phương Khánh (born 1995), beauty pageant
- Mai Thiên Vân (born 1982), singer and Bến Tre native; now lives in the U.S.
- Jack – J97 (born 1997), singer

== Gallery ==
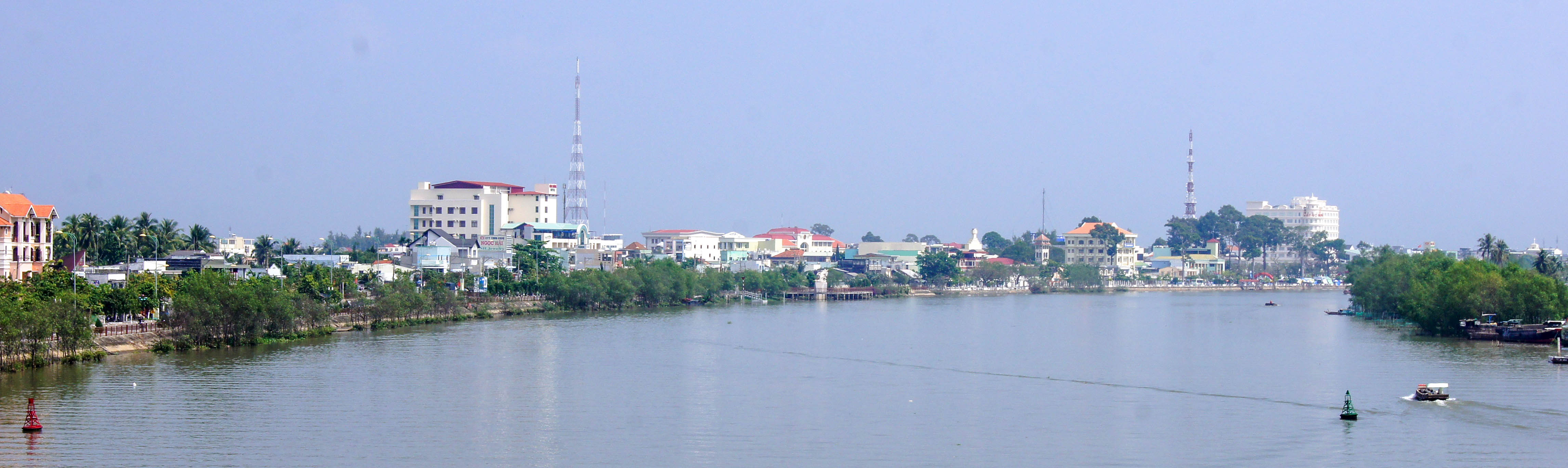
Panorama of Bến Tre city on the Bến Tre river
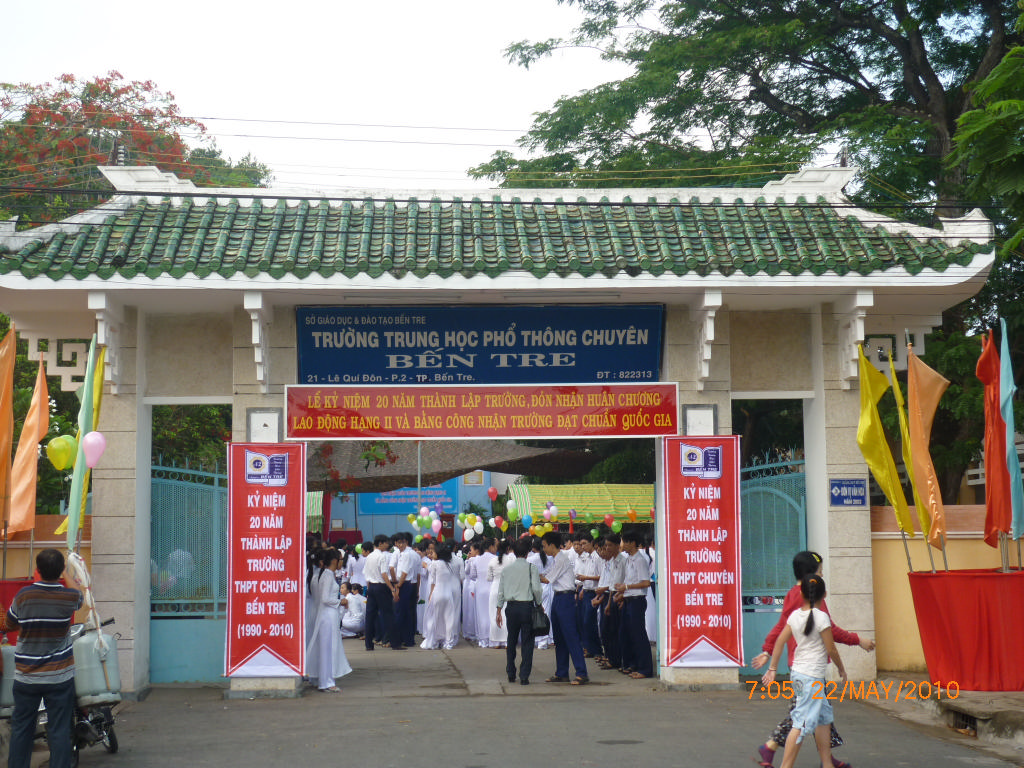
Trung học Phổ thông Chuyên Bến Tre

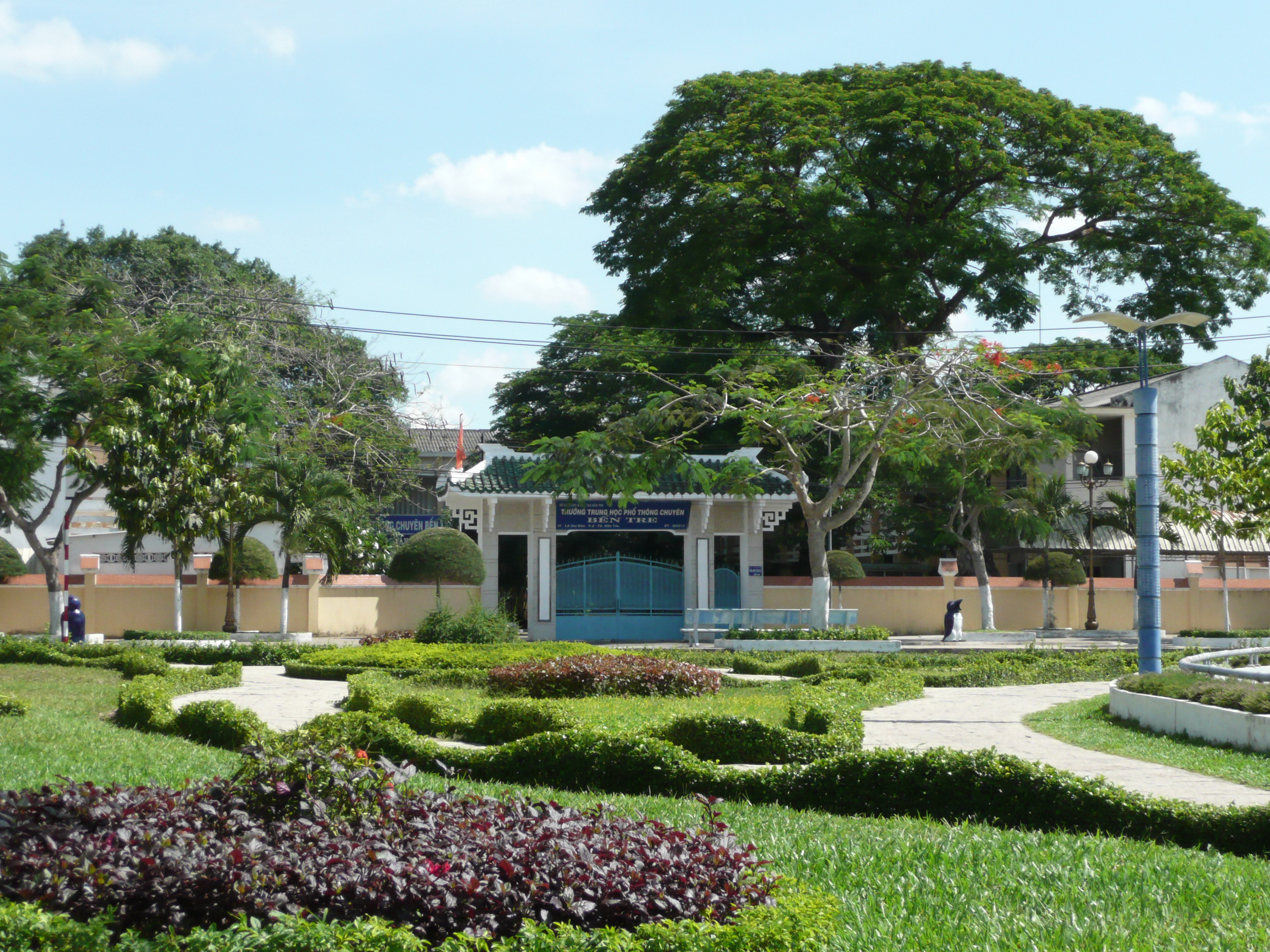
Công viên Trúc Giang

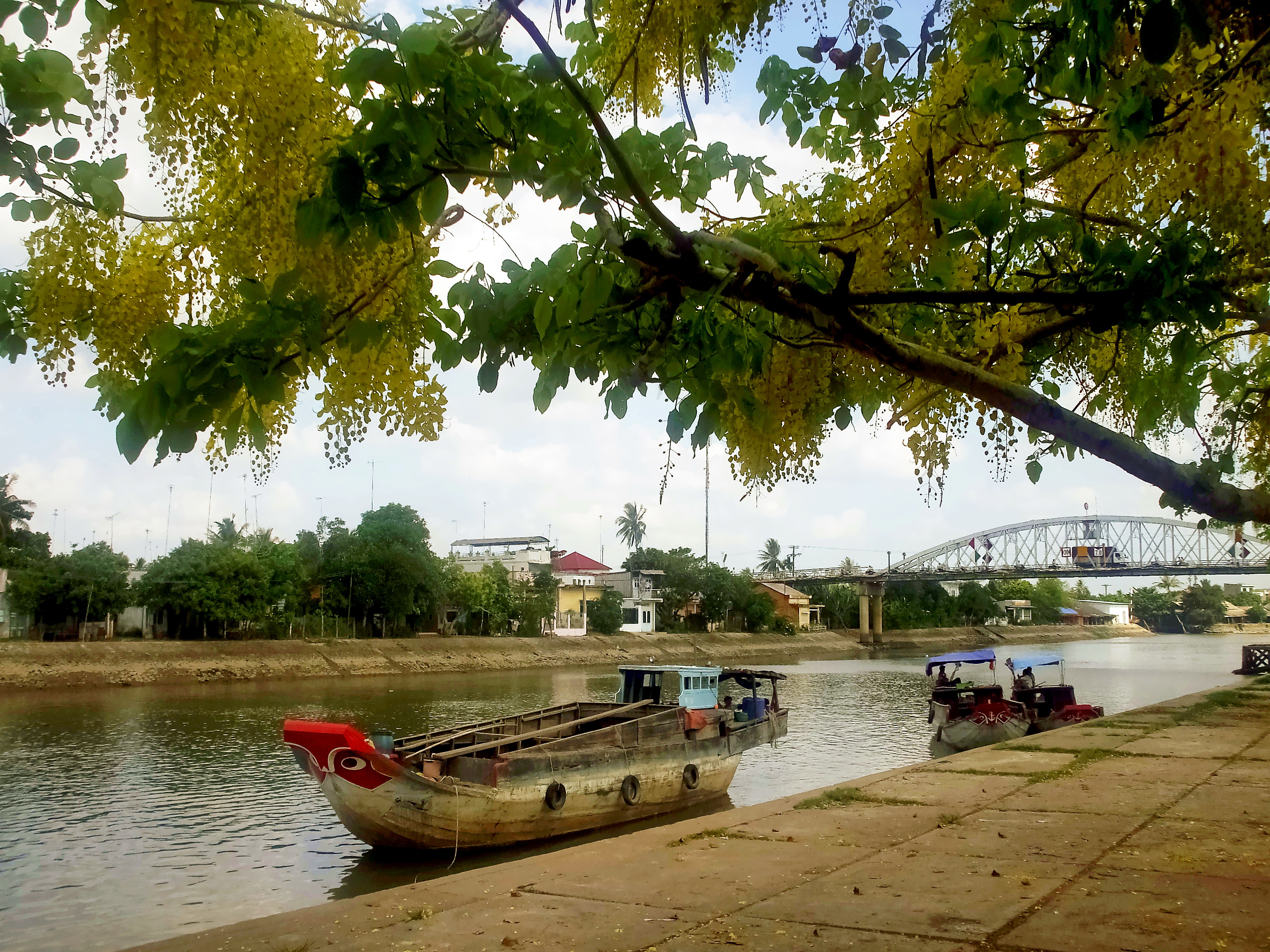
Kênh Chợ Lách

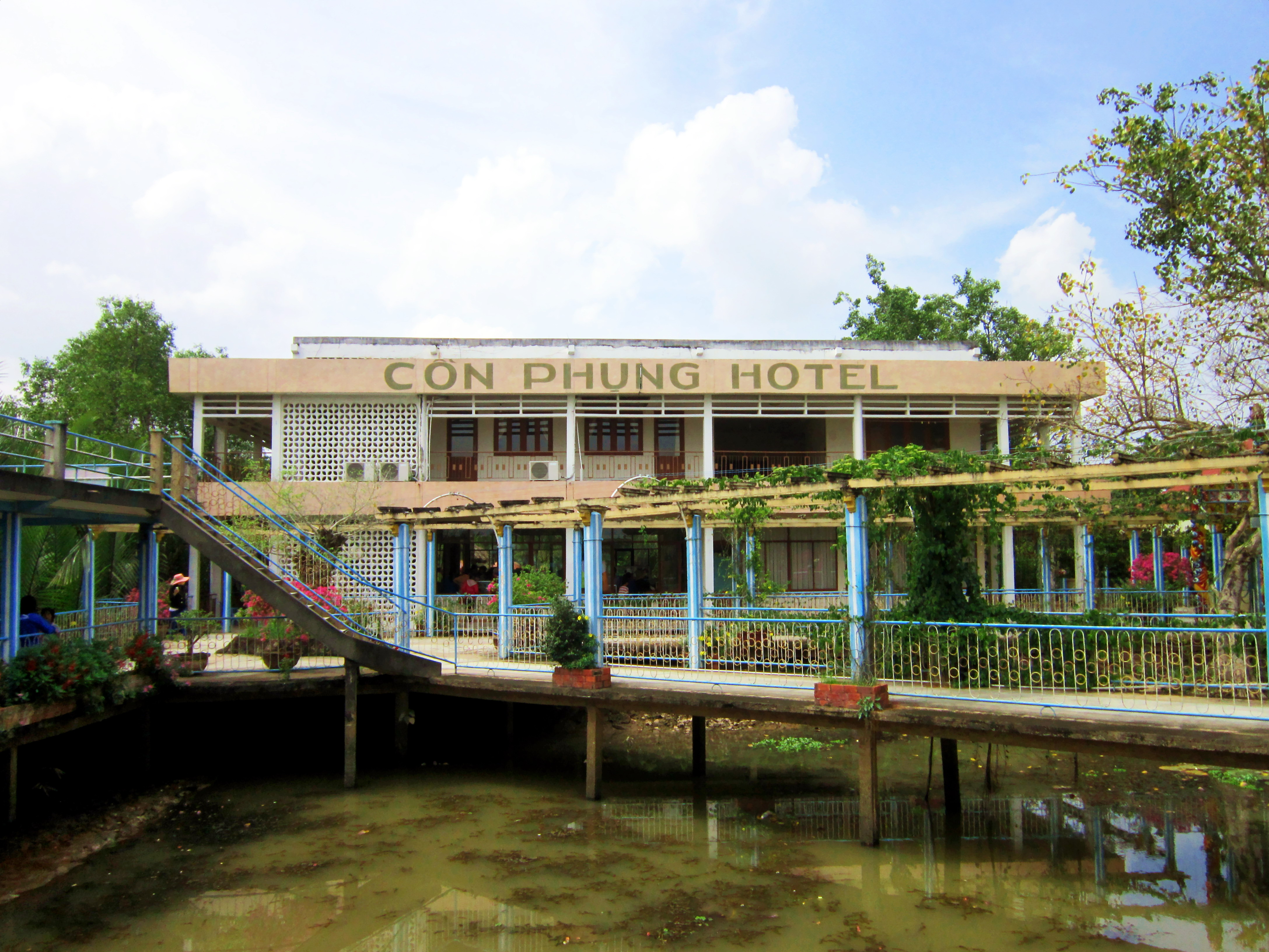
Cồn Phụng Hotel

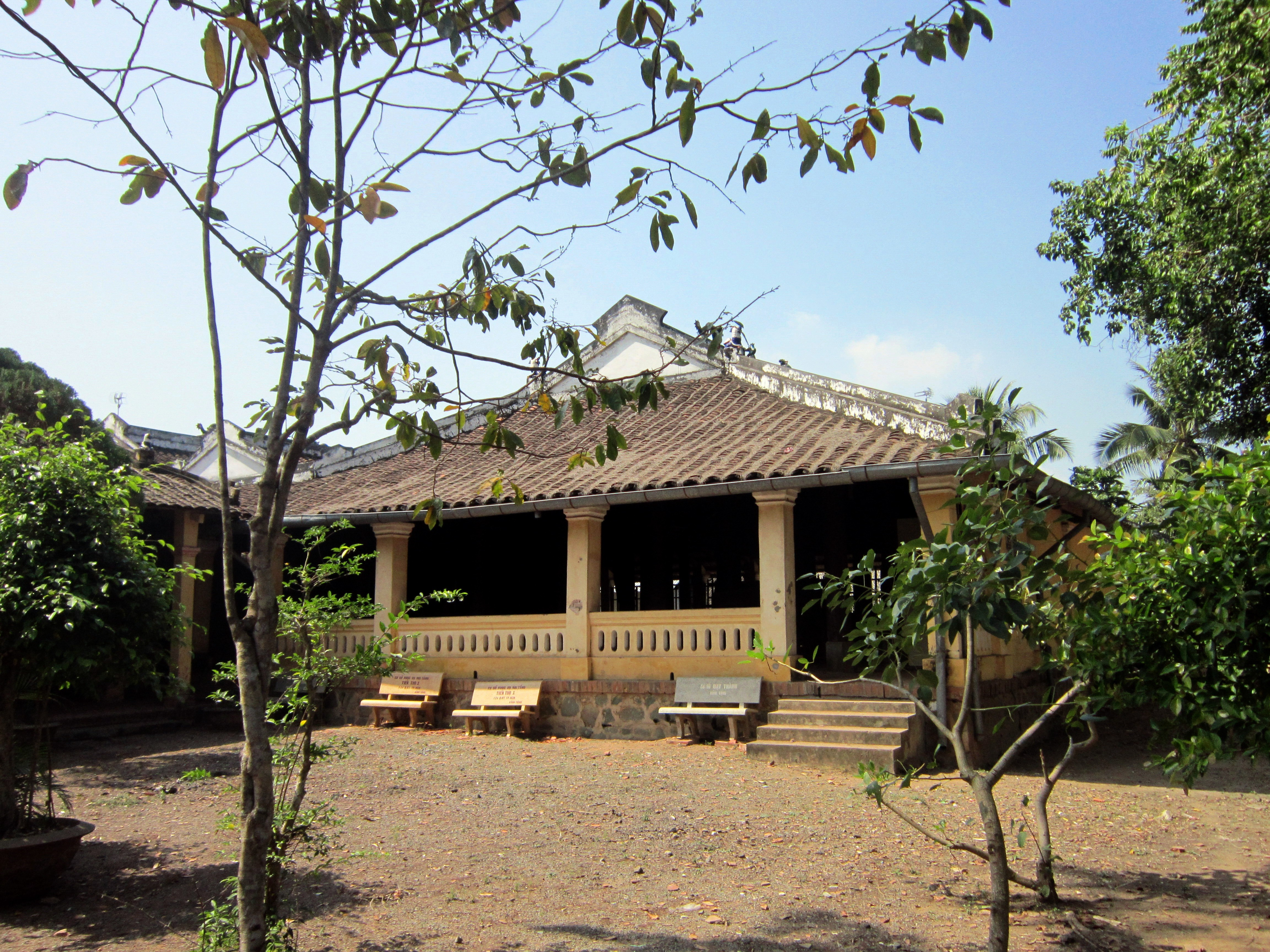
Tân Thạch Communal House

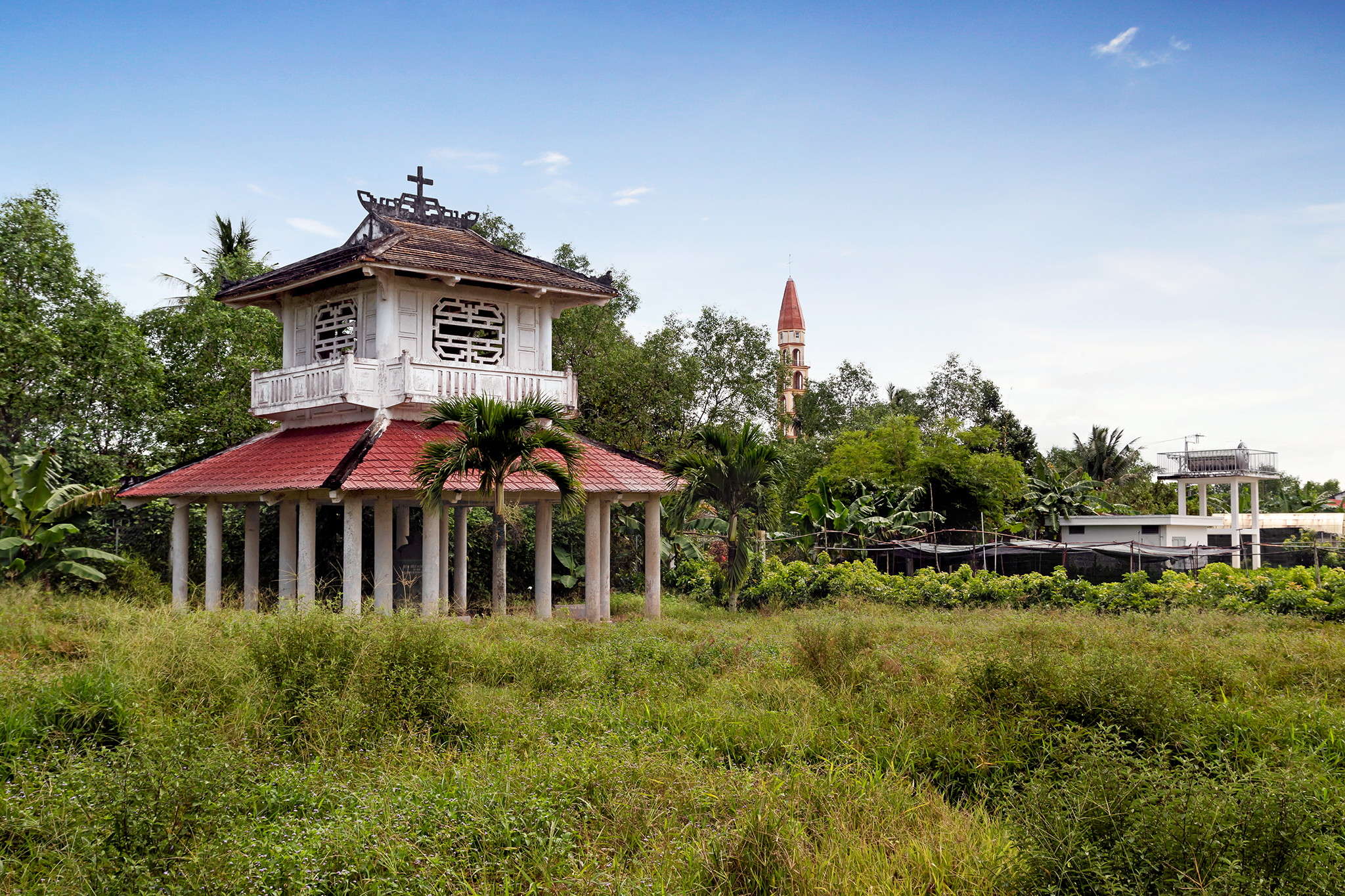
Memorial stele
Trương Vĩnh Ký

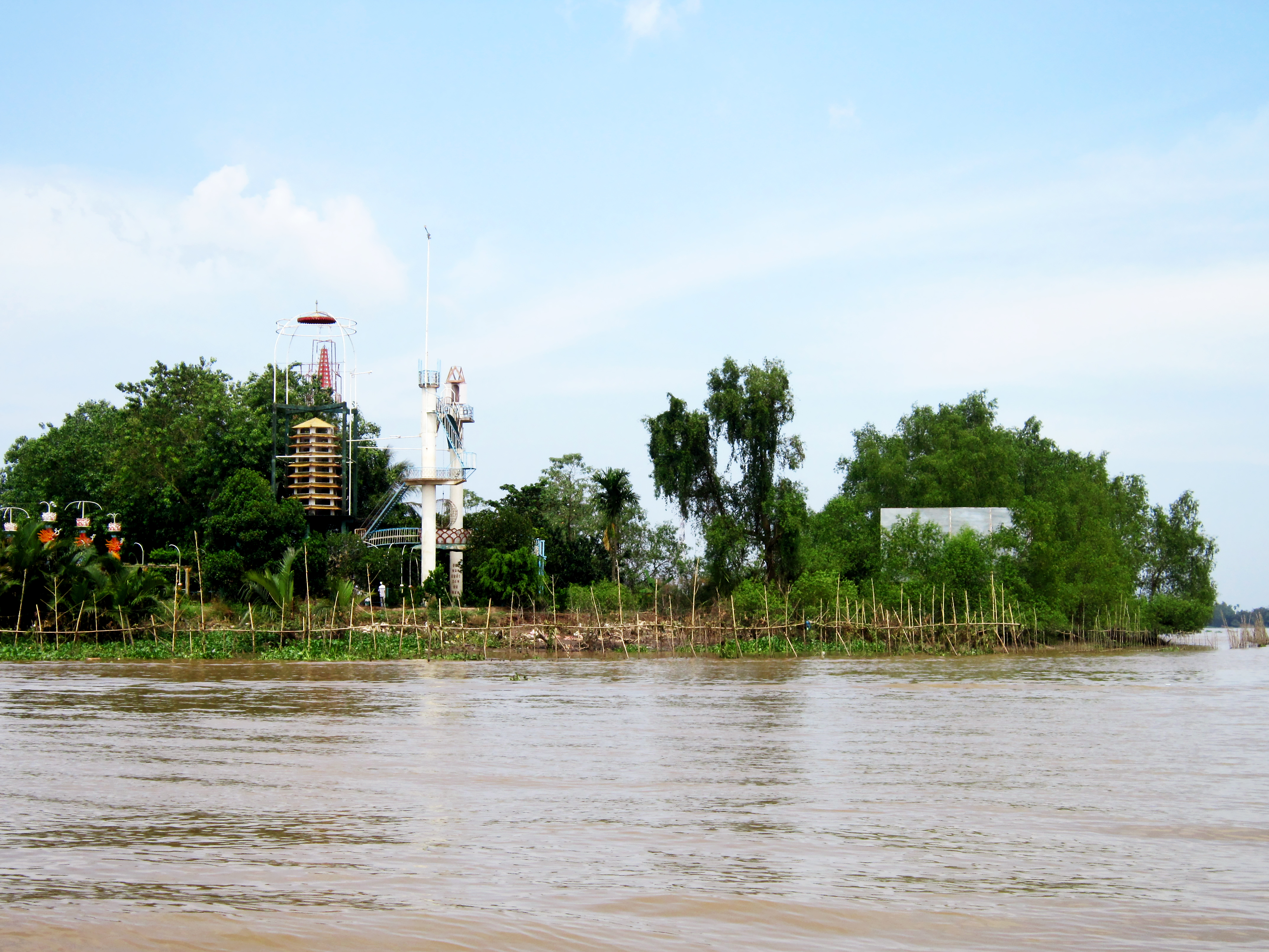
Reserves of Đạo Dừa
at Con Phung

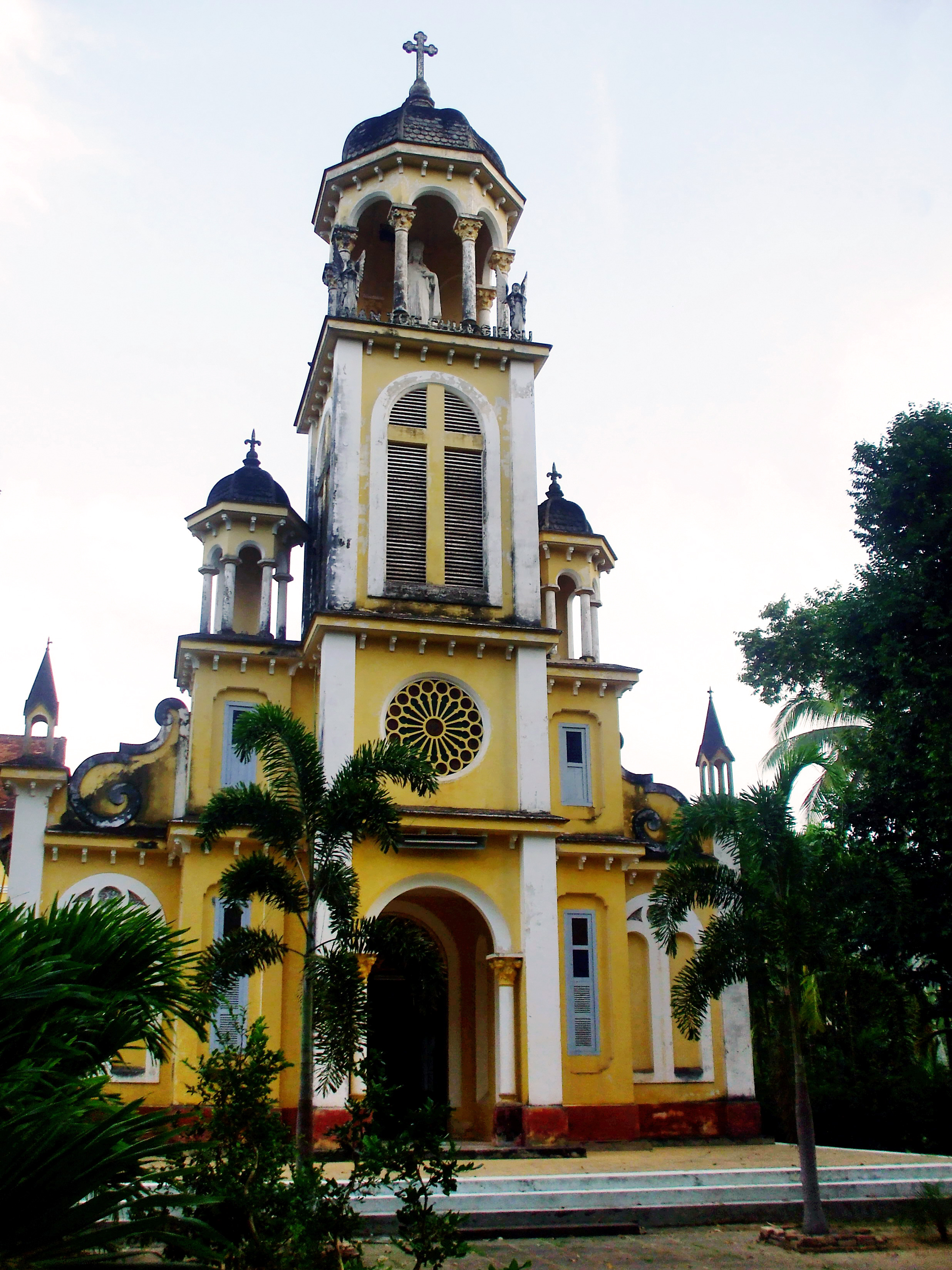
Congregation Church
Christ the King

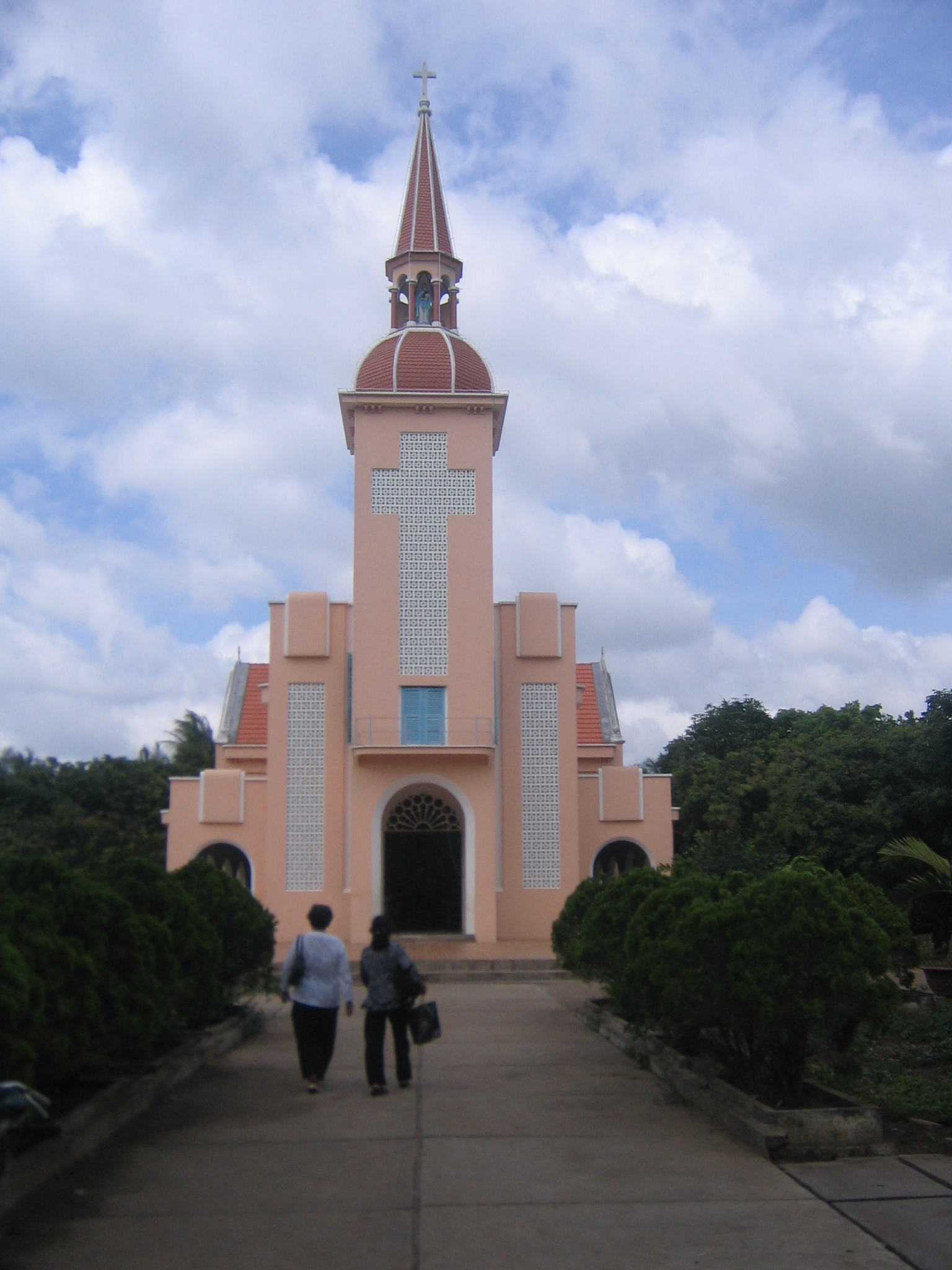
Church of Our Lady
Roman

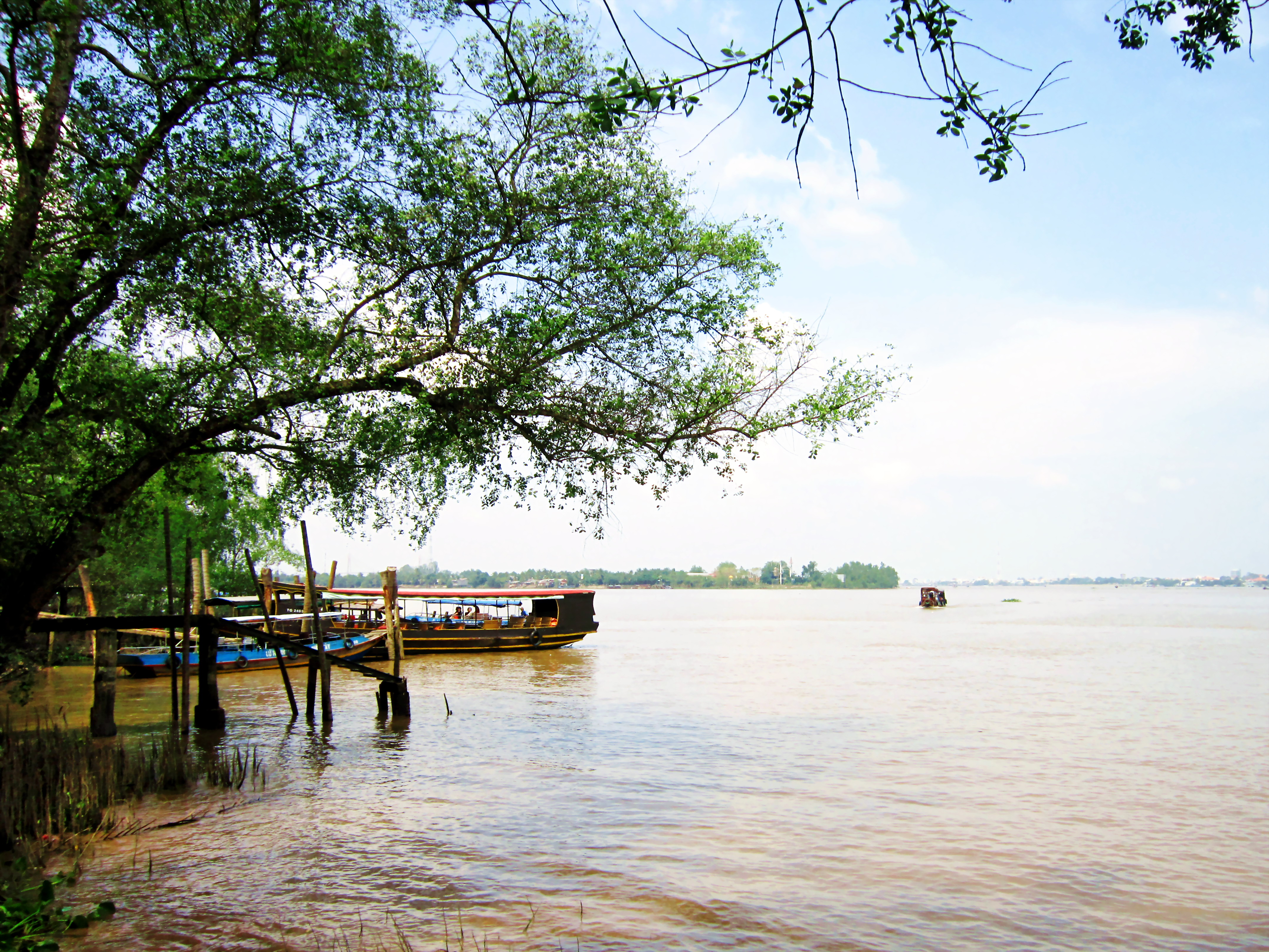
Tourist boats dock at Con Phung wharf on Tiền River

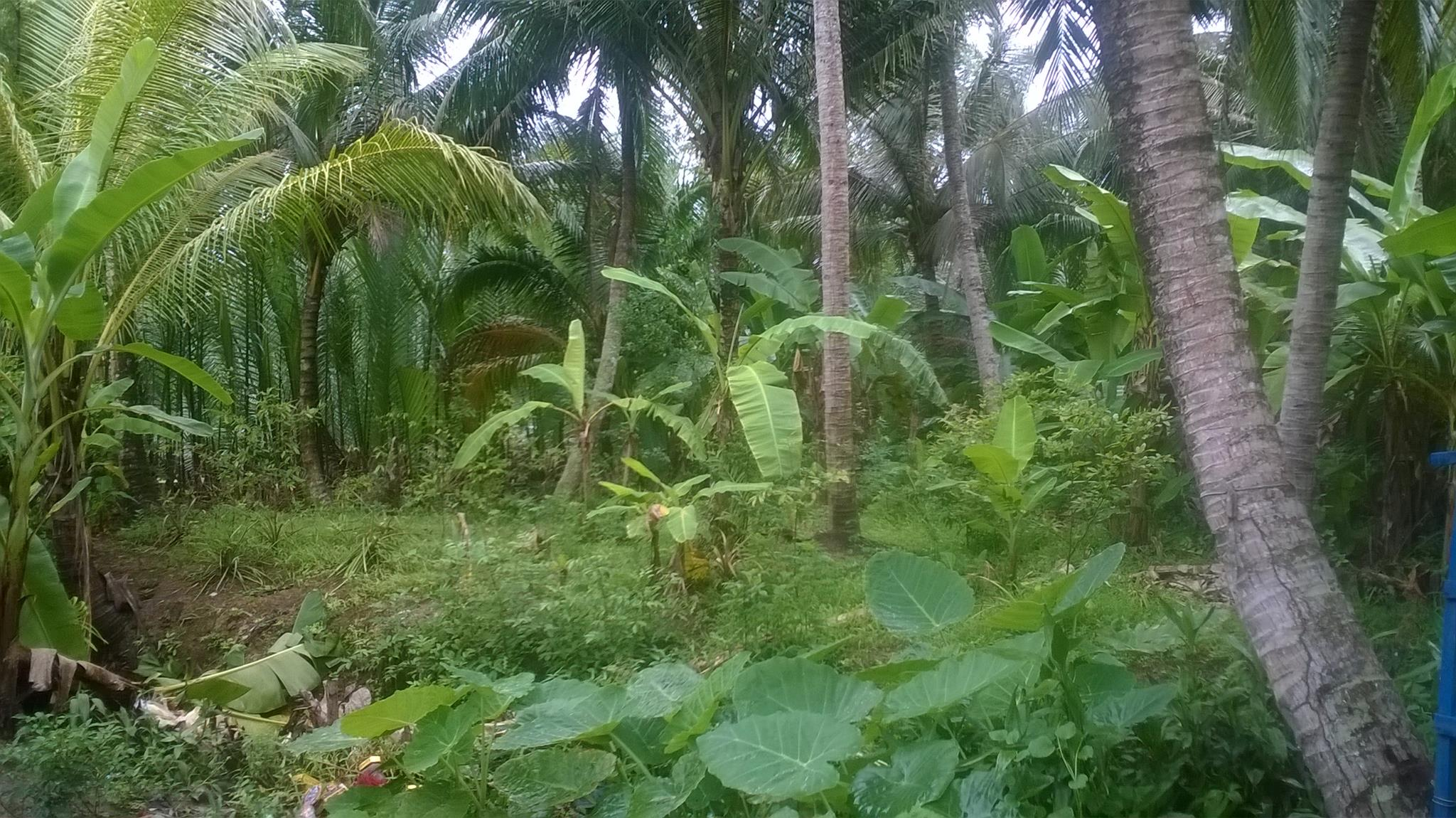
The coconut garden is green thanks to alluvium

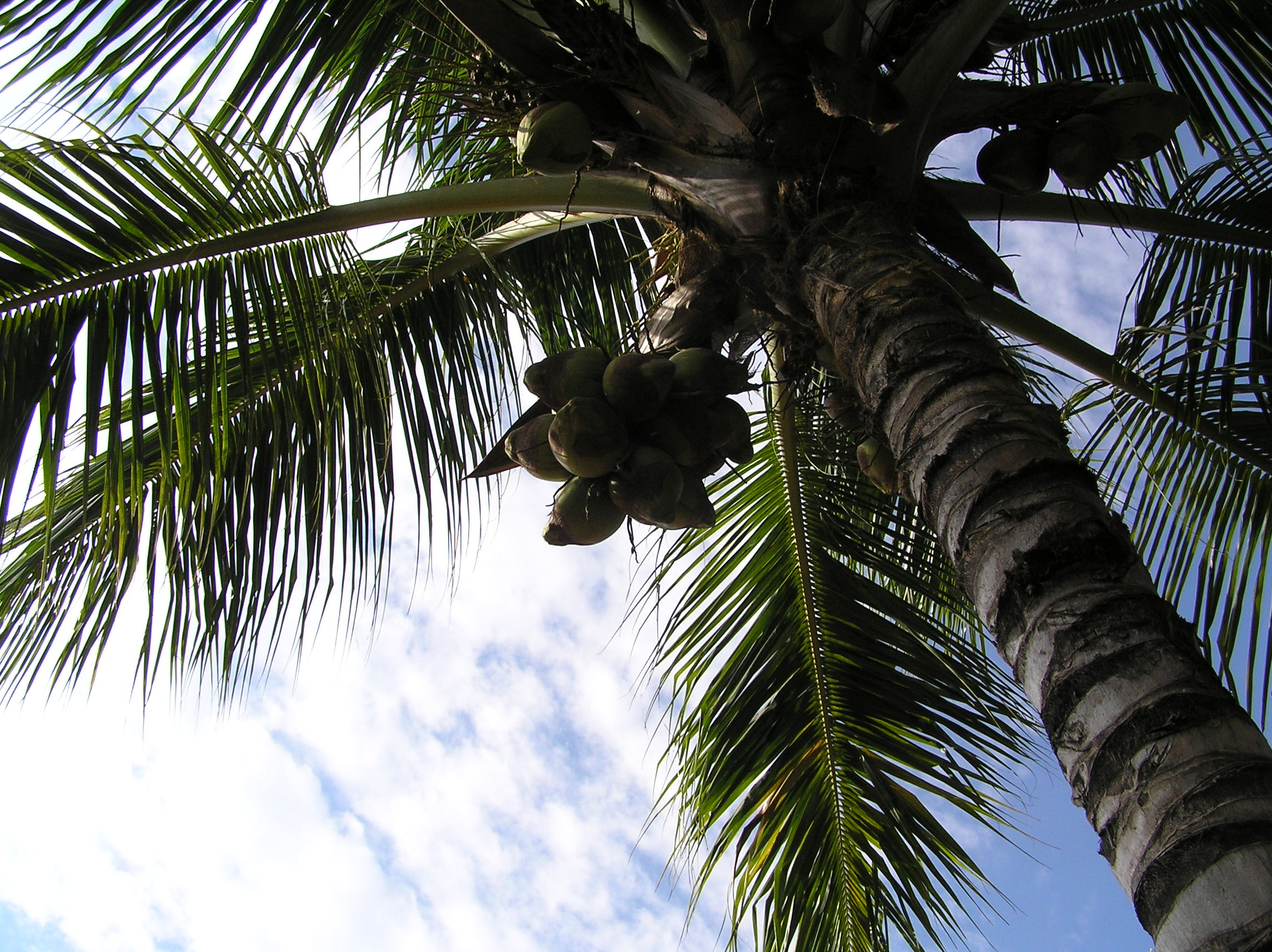
Coconut is a large-scale and popular crop grown in bến Tre
