= Tân Phú =

Tân Phú may refer to several places in Vietnam, including:

- Tân Phú district, Ho Chi Minh City, an urban district of Ho Chi Minh City
- Tân Phú district, Đồng Nai, a rural district of Đồng Nai province
- Tân Phú, district 7, a ward of District 7, Ho Chi Minh City
- Tân Phú, district 9, a ward of District 9, Ho Chi Minh City
- Tân Phú, Cần Thơ, a ward of Cái Răng district
- Tân Phú, Đồng Xoài, a ward of Đồng Xoài, Bình Phước province
- Tân Phú, Đồng Phú, a township and capital of Đồng Phú district in Bình Phước province
- Tân Phú, Đồng Nai, a township and capital of Tân Phú district in Đồng Nai province
- Tân Phú, Hanoi, a commune of Quốc Oai district
- Tân Phú, Thái Nguyên, a commune of Phổ Yên
- Tân Phú, Cai Lậy, a commune of Cai Lậy, Tiền Giang province
- Tân Phú, Hậu Giang, a commune of Long Mỹ
- Tân Phú, An Giang, a commune of Châu Thành district, An Giang province
- Tân Phú, Bến Tre, a commune of Châu Thành district, Bến Tre province
- Tân Phú, Cà Mau, a commune of Thới Bình district
- Tân Phú, a commune of Châu Thành district, Đồng Tháp province
- Tân Phú, Thanh Bình, a commune of Thanh Bình district, Đồng Tháp province
- Tân Phú, Long An, a commune of Đức Hòa district
- Tân Phú, Nghệ An, a commune of Tân Kỳ district
- Tân Phú, Phú Thọ, a commune of Tân Sơn district
- Tân Phú, Tây Ninh, a commune of Tân Châu district, Tây Ninh
- Tân Phú, Tân Phú Đông, a commune of Tân Phú Đông district, Tiền Giang province
- Tân Phú, Vĩnh Long, a commune of Tam Bình district

== See also ==
- Phú Tân (disambiguation)
- Tân Phú Đông district, Tiền Giang province
- Tân Phú Đông, Đồng Tháp, a commune of Sa Đéc
- Tân Phú Tây, a commune of Mỏ Cày Bắc district, Bến Tre province
- Tân Phú Thạnh, a commune of Châu Thành A district, Hậu Giang province
- Tân Phú Trung, Ho Chi Minh City, a commune of Củ Chi district
- Tân Phú Trung, Đồng Tháp, a commune of Châu Thành district, Đồng Tháp province
