= List of communes in Bến Tre province =

This is a list of communes in Bến Tre province by district.

== Mỏ Cày Bắc District ==
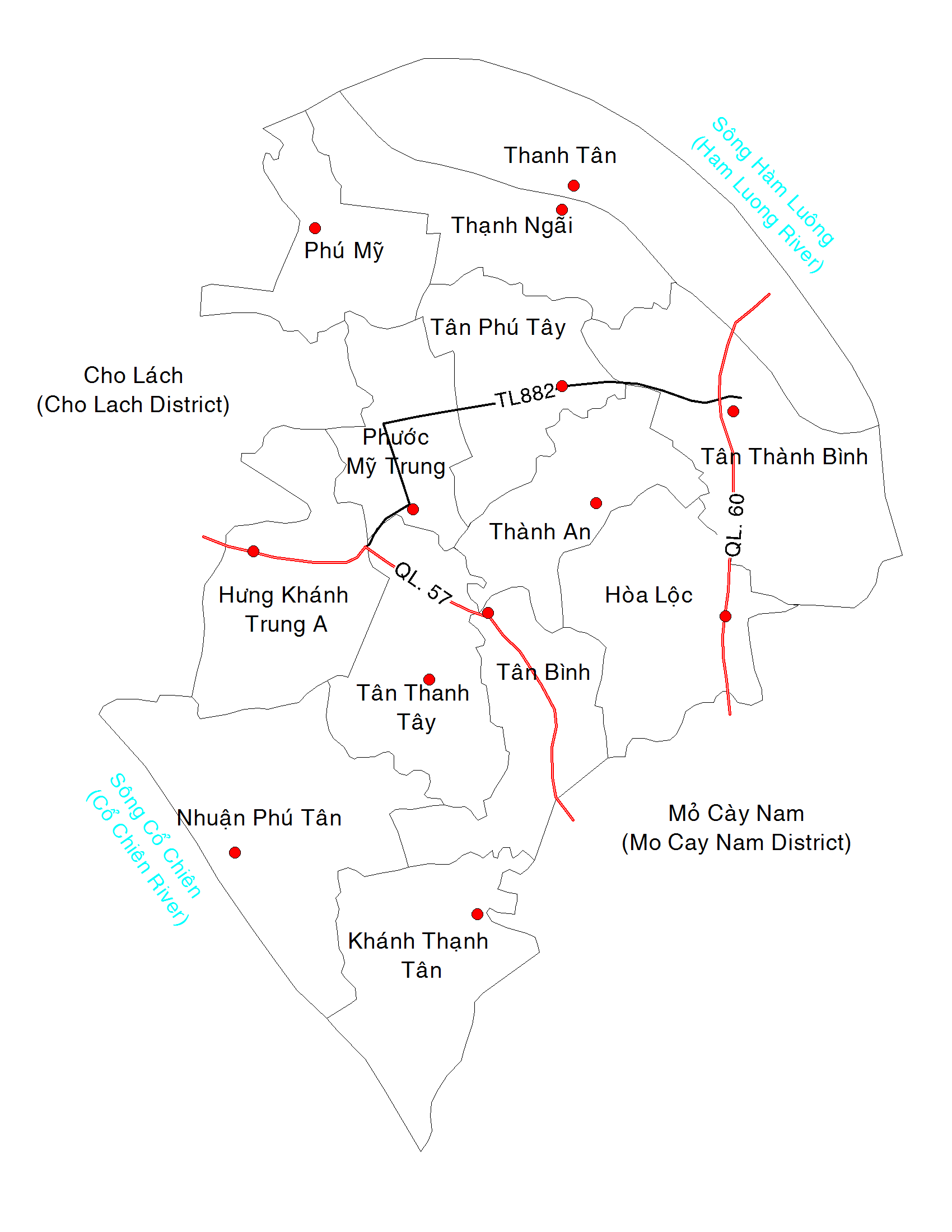
Location of communes in Mo Cay Bac District

Name	Area (km^{2})	Population (1999)	Density	Latitude	Longitude
Hòa Lộc	13.32	9159	688	10 9 57	106 19 11
Hưng Khánh Trung A	13.32	8760	658		
Khánh Thạnh Tân	13.4	11665	871	10 5 58	106 16 55
Nhuận Phú Tân	18.47	13136	711	10 7 34	106 14 49
Phú Mỹ	7.13	6132	860		
Phước Mỹ Trung	8.25	7303	885	10 11 55	106 16 16
Tân Bình	9.94	8493	854	10 8 49	106 17 54
Tân Phú Tây	10.2	7262	712	10 12 17	106 17 33
Tân Thành Bình	18.33	12968	707	10 11 45	106 19 53
Tân Thanh Tây	10.34	6603	639	10 9 15	106 16 28
Thành An	11.32	8106	716	10 116	106 17 42
Thạnh Ngãi	11.39	8887	780	10 14 13	106 17 16
Thanh Tân	20.24	11051	546	10 13 51	106 19 31
