= Mỏ Cày Bắc district =

Coordinates: 10°08′02″N 106°20′05″E

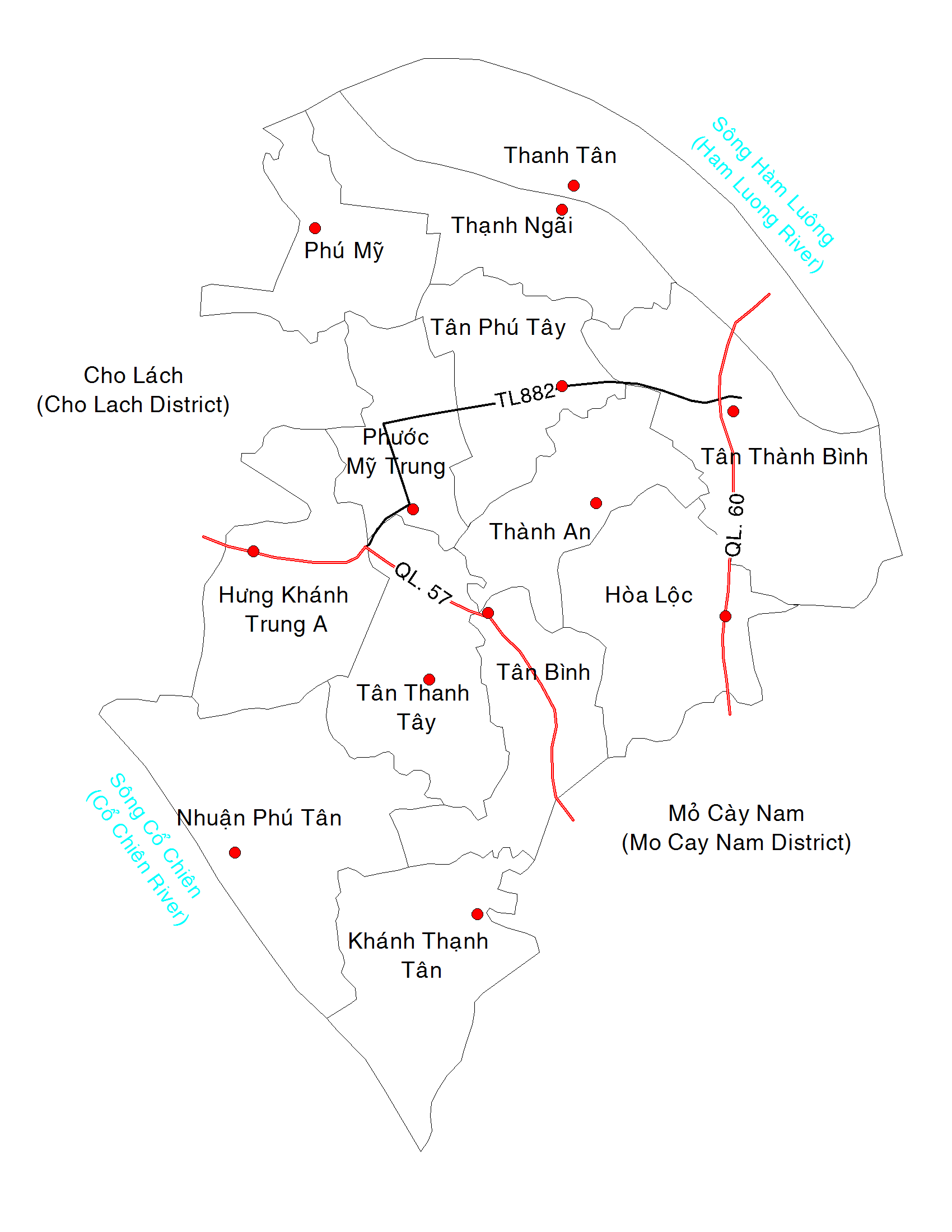
Communes and location of Mỏ Cày Bắc district

Mỏ Cày Bắc is a rural district (huyện) of Bến Tre province in the Mekong Delta of Vietnam. The district is established in March 2009.

Mỏ Cày Bắc borders Mỏ Cày Nam and Giồng Trôm districts to the east, Chợ Lách district to the west, Vĩnh Long province to the south and Châu Thành district and Bến Tre town to the north.

Mỏ Cày Bắc has a population of 113,210 in 2019 and covers an area of 154.6 km^{2}. The district is subdivided into 13 communes (xã): Thanh Tân, Thạnh Ngãi, Tân Phú Tây, Tân Thành Bình, Thành An, Phước Mỹ Trung, Tân Thanh Tây, Tân Bình, Nhuận Phú Tân, Hòa Lộc, Khánh Thạnh Tân, Hưng Khánh Trung A and Phú Mỹ.
