= Gia Thuận =

- Commune
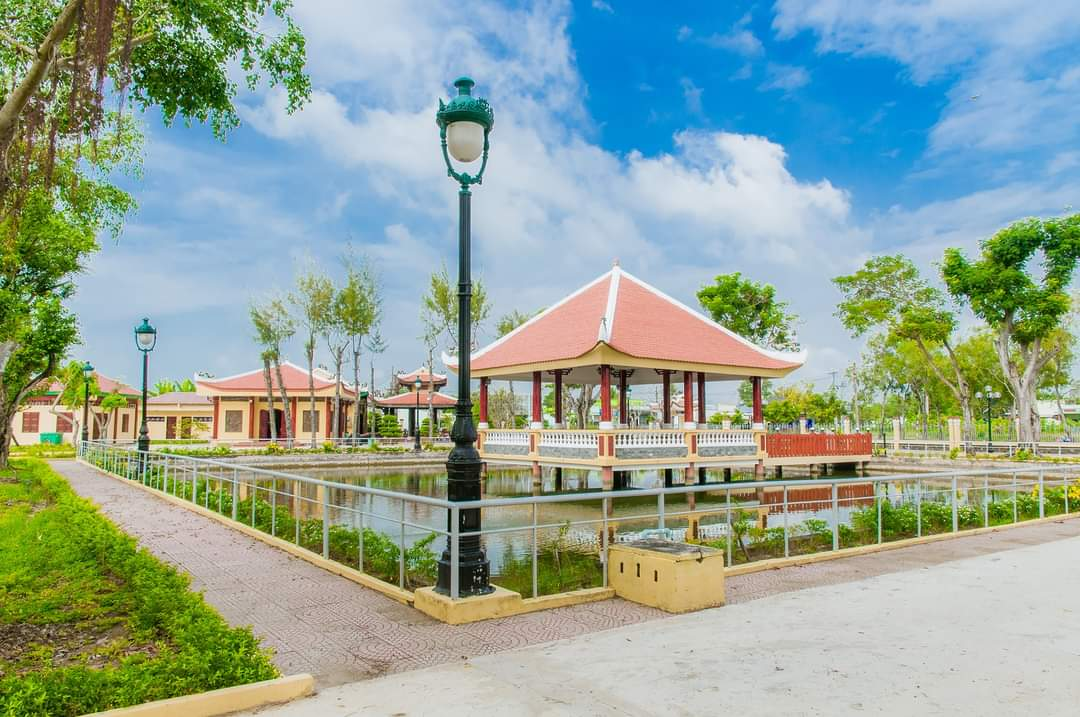
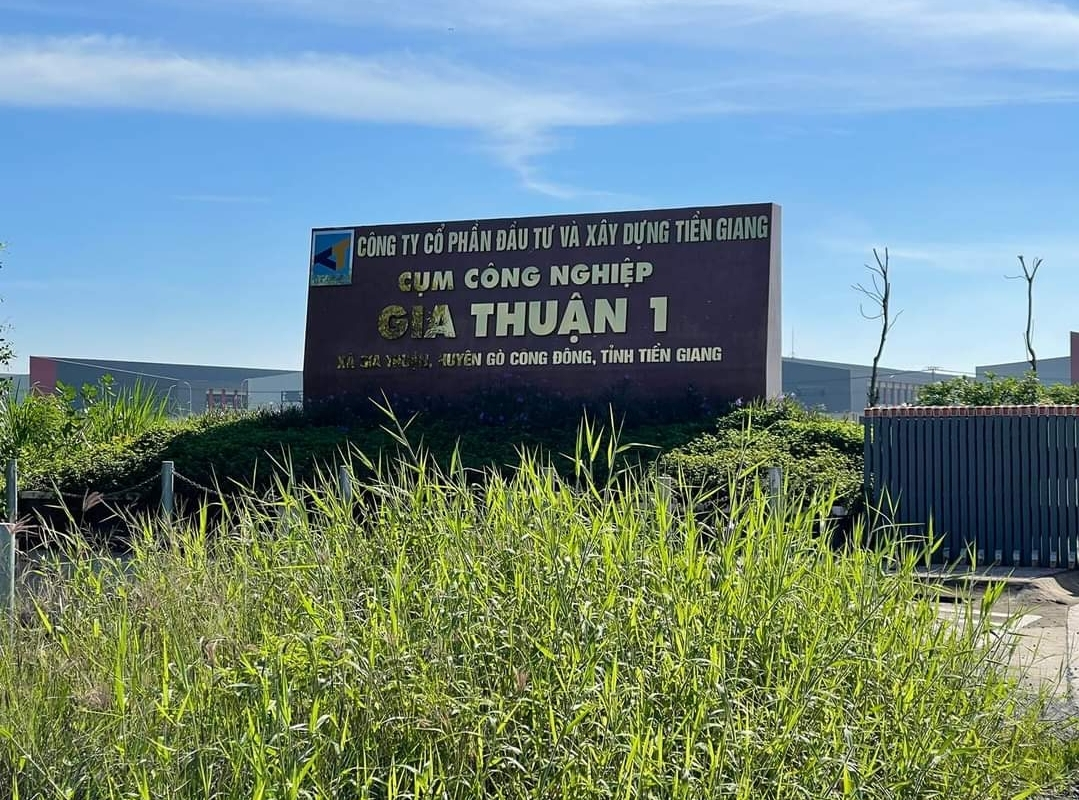
- From top to bottom: Trương Định Hero Temple, Gia Thuận 1 Industrial Cluster
- Interactive map of Gia Thuận
- Coordinates: 10°24′55″N 106°45′10″E
- Country: Vietnam
- Province: Đồng Tháp
- Establish: June 16, 2025

Area
  - Total: 67.4 km^{2} (26.0 sq mi)

Population (2025)
  - Total: 45,907 people
  - Density: 681/km^{2} (1,760/sq mi)
- Time zone: UTC+07:00

Gia Thuận is a commune in Đồng Tháp province, Vietnam. It is one of 102 communes and wards in the province following the 2025 reorganization.

Gia Thuận is one of the commune located in the eastern most part of Đồng Tháp province, along with Tân Điền, Gò Công Đông, and Tân Phú Đông communes.

== Geography ==
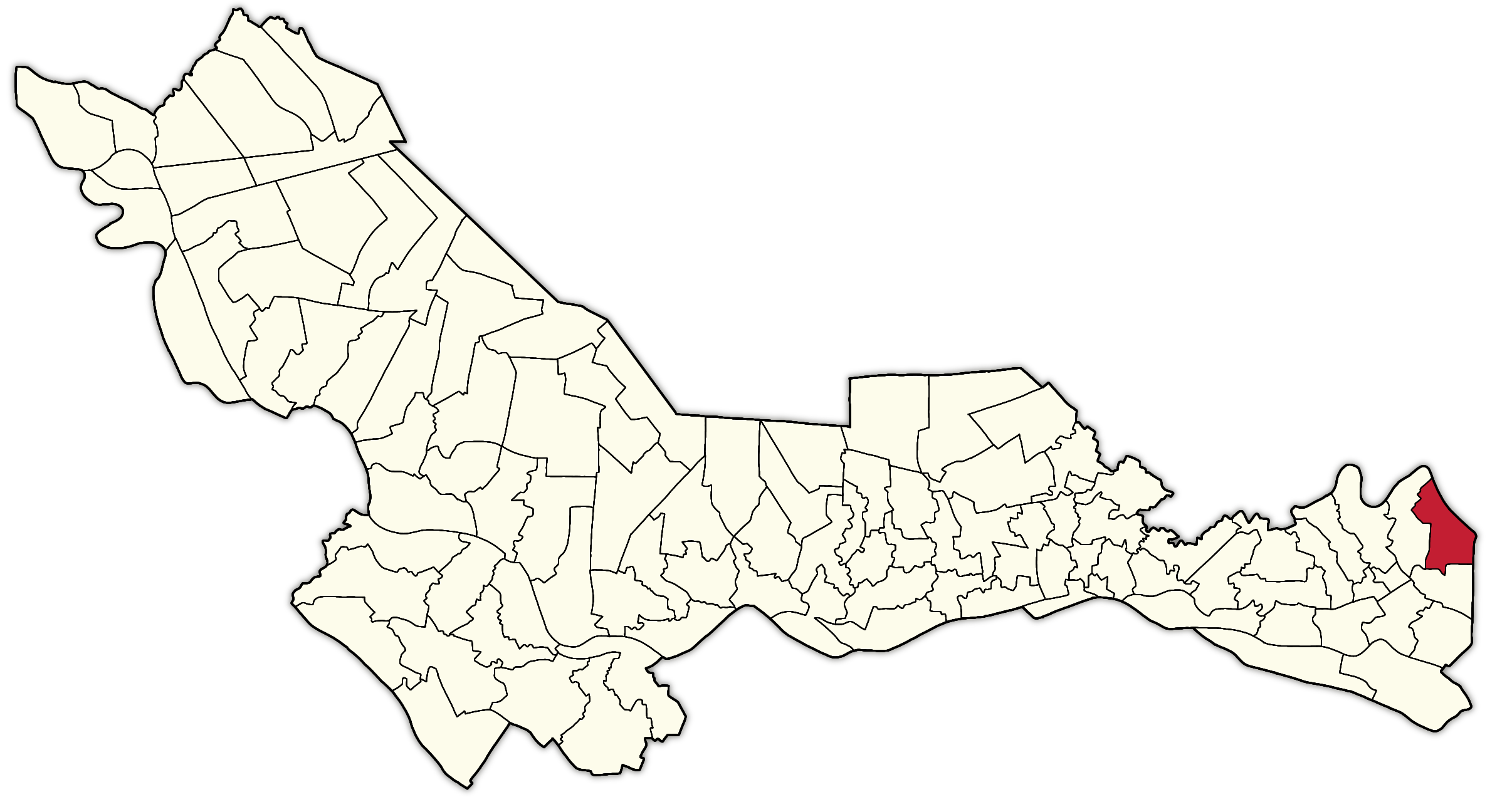
Location of Gia Thuận commune in Đồng Tháp province map (highlight in red).

Gia Thuận is a coastal commune located in the eastern part of Đồng Tháp province, 150km east of Cao Lãnh ward, 55km east of Mỹ Tho ward, and 15km northeast of Gò Công ward. The commune has the following geographical location:

- To the west, it borders Tân Đông commune.
- To the south, it borders Tân Điền commune.
- To the east, it borders An Thới Đông commune of Hồ Chí Minh city.

== History ==
Prior to 2025, Gia Thuận commune was formerly Vàm Láng commune-level town, Kiểng Phước commune, and Gia Thuận commune in Gò Công Đông district, Tiền Giang province.

On June 12, 2025, the National Assembly of Vietnam issued Resolution No. 202/2025/QH15 on the reorganization of provincial-level administrative units. Accordingly:

- Đồng Tháp province was established by merging the entire area and population of Đồng Tháp province and Tiền Giang province.

On June 16, 2025, the Standing Committee of the National Assembly of Vietnam issued Resolution No. 1663/NQ-UBTVQH15 on the reorganization of commune-level administrative units in Đồng Tháp province. Accordingly:

- Gia Thuận commune was established by merging the entire area and population of Vàm Láng commune-level town, Kiểng Phước commune, and Gia Thuận commune (formerly part of Gò Công Đông district).
