= Phú Tân =

Phú Tân may refer to several places in Vietnam, including:

- Phú Tân district, An Giang, a district of An Giang province
- Phú Tân district, Cà Mau, a district of Ca Mau province
- Phú Tân, Bến Tre, a ward of Bến Tre City
- Phú Tân, Bình Dương, a ward of Thủ Dầu Một
- Phú Tân, Hậu Giang, a commune of Châu Thành District, Hậu Giang Province
- Phú Tân, Sóc Trăng, a commune of Châu Thành District, Sóc Trăng Province
- Phú Tân, Đồng Nai, a commune of Định Quán District
- Phú Tân, Cà Mau, a commune of Cà Mau province
- Phú Tân, Tiền Giang, a commune of Tân Phú Đông District

== See also ==
- Tân Phú (disambiguation)
