= An Thới =

An Thới may refer to several places in Vietnam, including:

- An Thới, Cần Thơ, a ward of Bình Thủy District
- An Thới, Kiên Giang, a township of Phú Quốc
- An Thoi Naval Base, in An Thới, Kiên Giang
- An Thới, Bến Tre, a rural commune of Mỏ Cày Nam District.

== See also ==
- An Thới Đông
