= Lê Anh Xuân =

Vietnamese poet

Lê Anh Xuân (chữ Hán: 黎英春; 5 June 1940 – 24 May 1968) was a Vietnamese poet. He was awarded the title of Hero of the People's Armed Forces for his contributions.

== Biography ==
His real name was Ca Lê Hiến, he was born on June 5, 1940, in Bến Tre, his hometown in Tân Thành Bình commune, Mỏ Cày district (now belongs to Mỏ Cày Bắc district), Bến Tre Province. His father was professor Ca Văn Thỉnh, a teacher, and literature researcher. The members of his family were well-known teachers and artists. His brother was Ca Lê Thuần, and his younger sister was Ca Lê Hồng—the former president of the Ho Chi Minh City School of Dramatic Arts. His younger brother was the artist Ca Lê Thắng.

He had early contact with poetry as a child, at the age of 12 he began learning culture, while working at Trình Đình Trọng printshop in the Southern Department of Education.

In 1954, he followed his family to the North, studied at the Southern School, Nguyễn Trãi High School (Hanoi), and then entered the History Department at the University of Hanoi. His first poem "Nhớ mưa quê hương" (Remembering the rain of the homeland) won the hearts of readers and won the second prize in the 1960s poetry competition of Văn Nghệ magazine. Lê Anh Xuân worked as a lecturer in the History Faculty and was sent to study abroad but he refused to return to his hometown.

In December 1964, Lê Anh Xuân volunteered for the South and worked at the Education Subcommittee of the Central Propaganda Department. By July 7, 1965, he moved to work at the Liberation Arts Association. From here, Lê Anh Xuân lived as a soldier and an artist.

At the end of 1964, he crossed Trường Sơn to the South, and worked at the Subcommittee of Education under the Central Propaganda Department of the Central Office for South Vietnam and later the Southern Liberation Arts Association. During this time, he began to use the pen name Lê Anh Xuân. In 1966, he joined the Communist Party of Vietnam. In addition to poetry, he also wrote prose.

Lê Anh Xuân died on May 21, 1968, in Phước Quang Hamlet, Phước Lợi Commune, Cần Đước District, Long An Province in a raid of the US Army.

== Legacy ==
His name is set for a street in District 1. In Đồng Hới city, Quảng Bình there is a road named after Lê Anh Xuân in Bac Ly ward.

In 2001, he was posthumously awarded the State Prize for Arts and Literatures, and in 2011, he was posthumously awarded the title Hero of the People's Armed Forces.
