= Long Thuận =

Long Thuận could refer to the following places in Vietnam:

- Long Thuận: ward in Đồng Tháp province.
- Long Thuận: commune in Tây Ninh province.
