= Gò Công Đông =

- Commune
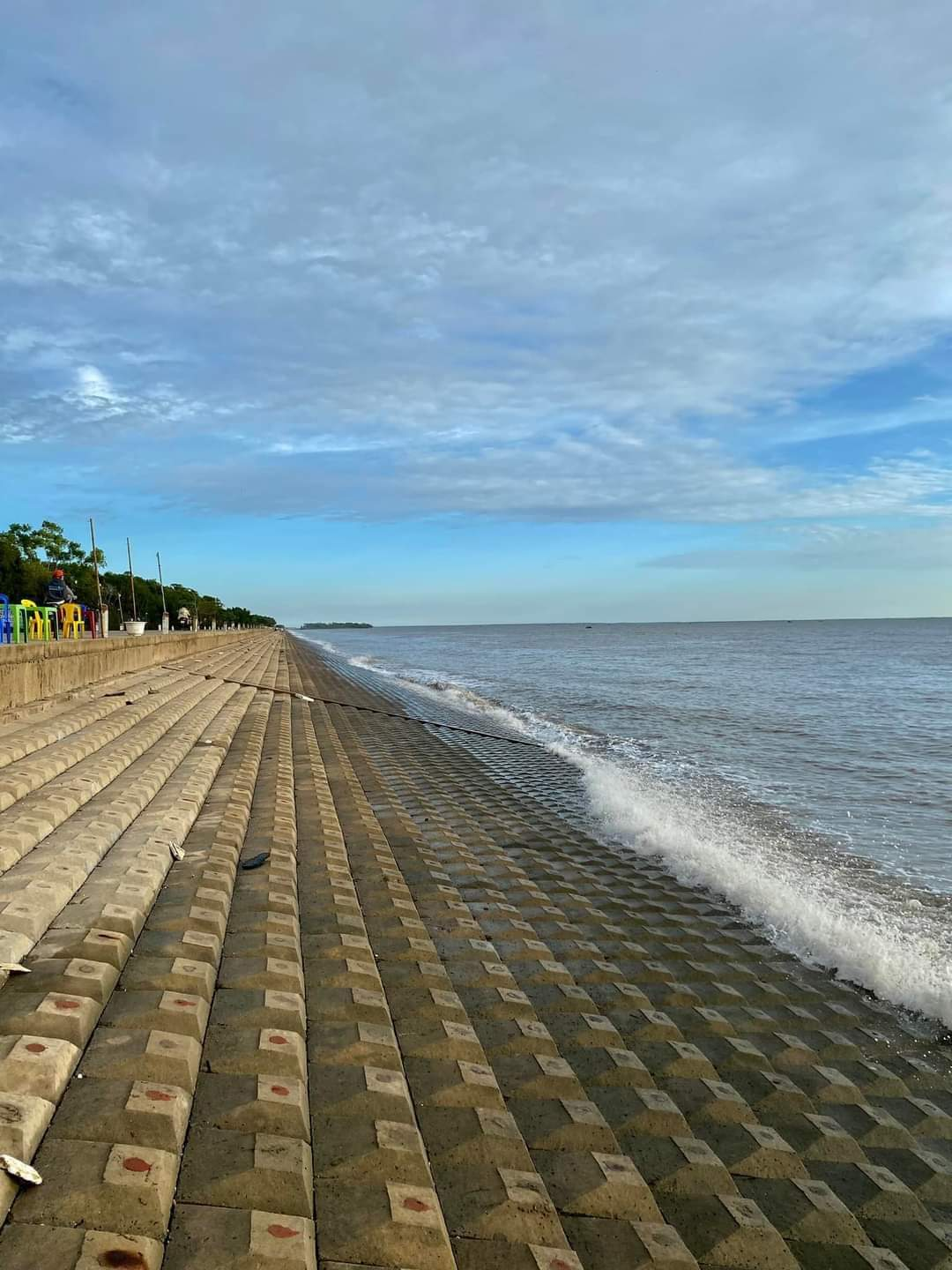
- Tân Thành Beach Tourist Area
- Interactive map of Gò Công Đông
- Country: Vietnam
- Province: Đồng Tháp
- Establish: June 16, 2025

Area
  - Total: 106.41 km^{2} (41.09 sq mi)

Population (2025)
  - Total: 30,104 people
  - Density: 282.91/km^{2} (732.72/sq mi)
- Time zone: UTC+07:00

Gò Công Đông is a commune in Đồng Tháp province, Vietnam. It is one of 102 communes and wards in the province.

Gò Công Đông is one of the communes located in the eastern most part of Đồng Tháp province, along with Tân Phú Đông, Tân Điền, and Gia Thuận communes.

== Geography ==
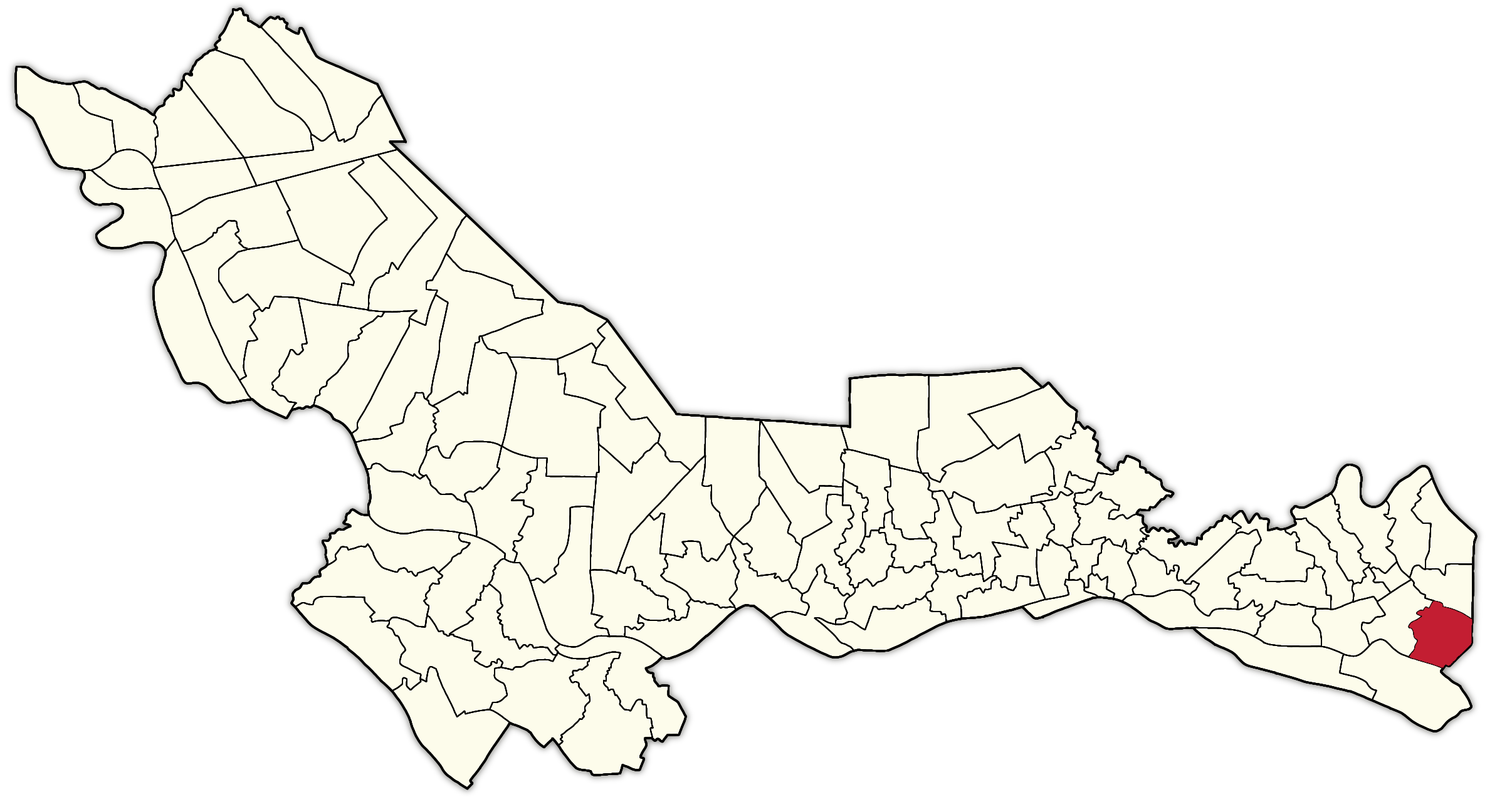
Location of Gò Công Đông commune on Đồng Tháp province map (highlight in red).

Gò Công Đông is a coastal commune located in the eastern part of Đồng Tháp province, approximately 150 km from Cao Lãnh ward, 55 km east of Mỹ Tho ward, and 15 km east of Gò Công ward. The commune has the following geographical location:

- To the east, it borders the East Sea.
- To the south, it borders Tân Phú Đông commune.
- To the west, it borders Tân Hòa commune.
- To the north, it borders Tân Điền commune.

== History ==
Prior to 2025, Gò Công Đông commune was formerly Tăng Hòa commune and Tân Thành commune, both belonging to Gò Công Đông district, Tiền Giang province.

On June 12, 2025, the National Assembly of Vietnam issued Resolution No. 202/2025/QH15 on the reorganization of provincial-level administrative units. Accordingly:

- Đồng Tháp province was established by merging the entire area and population of Đồng Tháp province and Tiền Giang province.

On June 16, 2025, the Standing Committee of the National Assembly of Vietnam issued Resolution No. 1663/NQ-UBTVQH15 on the reorganization of commune-level administrative units in Đồng Tháp province. Accordingly:

- Gò Công Đông commune was established by merging the entire area and population of Tăng Hòa and Tân Thành communes (formerly part of Gò Công Đông district).
