= Gò Công Đông district =

Coordinates: 10°22′04″N 106°44′45″E

Gò Công Đông
- District
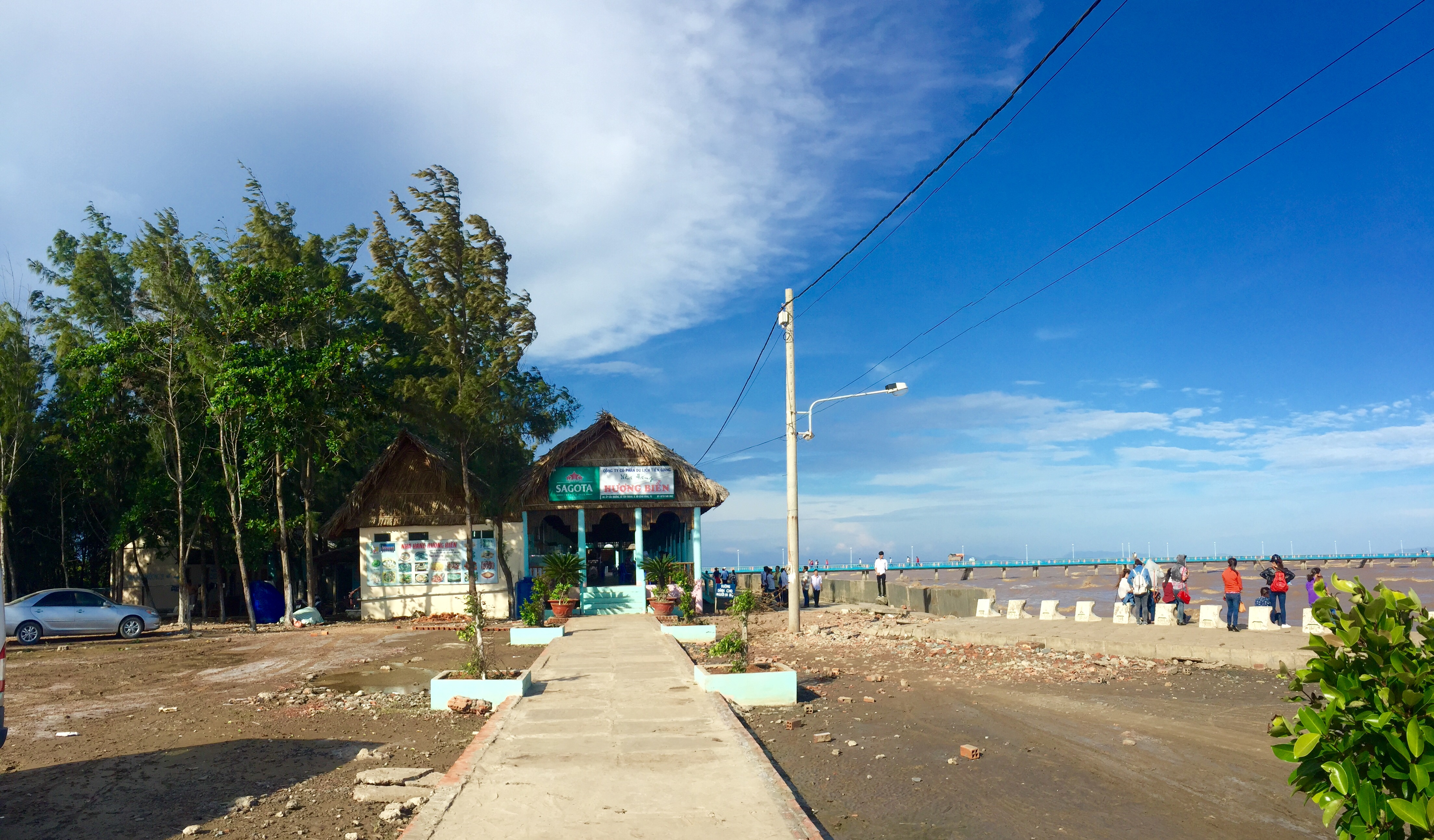
- View by the road of Tân Thành

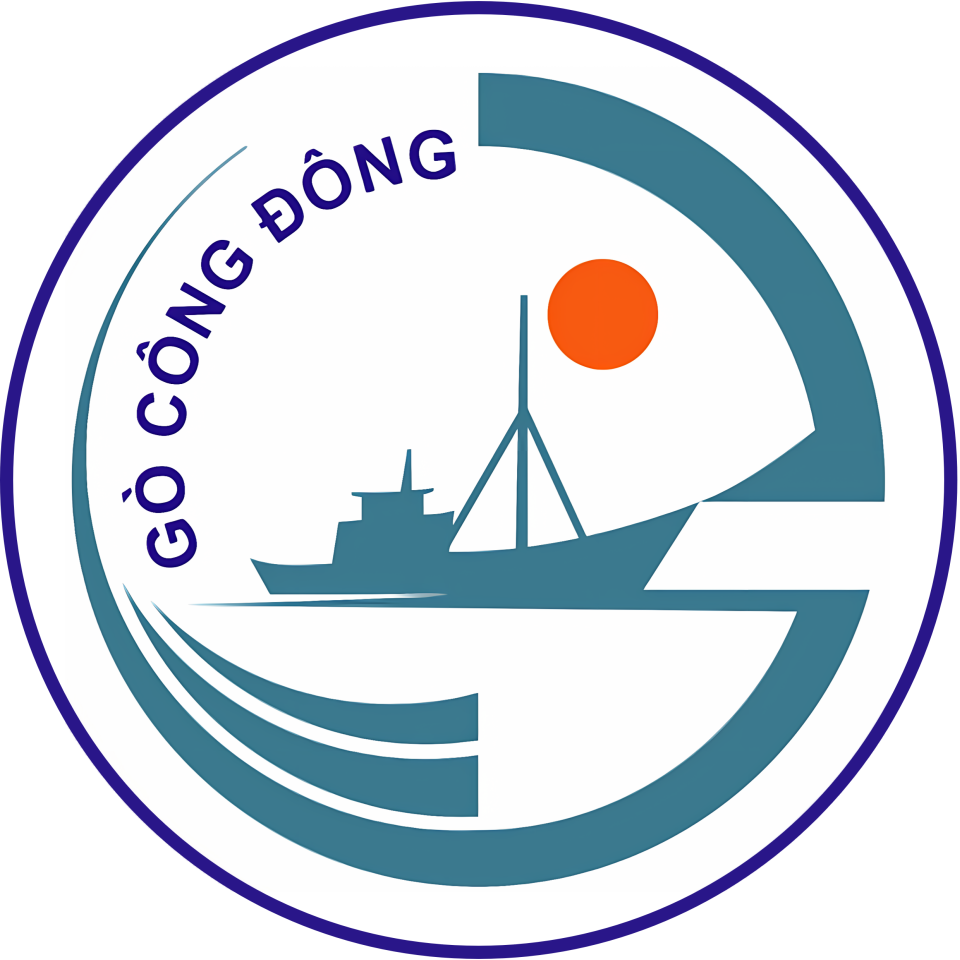
- Seal
- Interactive map of Gò Công Đông
- Country: Vietnam
- Region: Mekong Delta
- Province: Tiền Giang
- Capital: Tân Hòa commune-level town

Area
  - Total: 116.26 sq mi (301.11 km^{2})

Population (2024)
  - Total: 140,540 people
- Time zone: UTC+7 (UTC + 7)

Gò Công Đông is a former district of Tiền Giang province, in the Mekong Delta region of Vietnam. The district capital lies at Tân Hòa. After being dissolved in 2025 following administrative reforms in Vietnam, the district was divided into 5 communes: Gò Công Đông, Tân Hòa, Tân Điền, Gia Thuận, and Tân Đông all belonging to Đồng Tháp province.

== Geography ==
Gò Công Đông district has a geographical location:

- To the west, it borders Gò Công Tây district and Gò Công provincial city.
- To the south, it borders Tân Phú Đông district.
- To the east, it borders the East Sea.
- To the northwest, it borders Long An province.
- To the northeast it borders Hồ Chí Minh city.
