= Sơn Qui =

- Ward
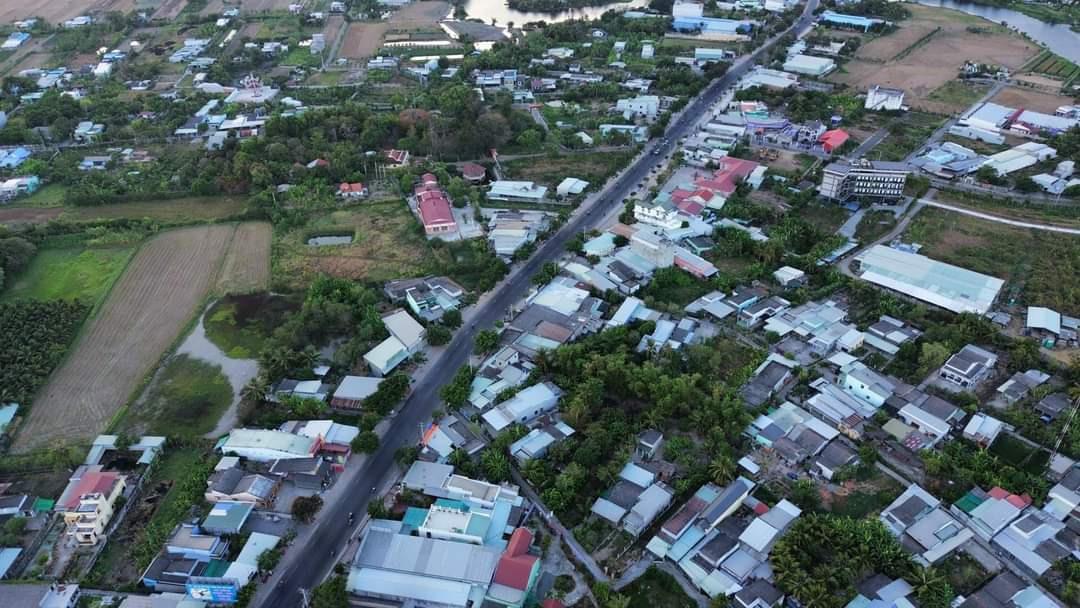
- A view of Sơn Qui ward from above.
- Interactive map of Sơn Qui
- Country: Vietnam
- Province: Đồng Tháp
- Establish: June 16, 2025

Area
  - Total: 49 km^{2} (19 sq mi)

Population (2025)
  - Total: 46,507 people
  - Density: 950/km^{2} (2,500/sq mi)

Sơn Qui (It also written as Sơn Quy) is a ward in Đồng Tháp province, Vietnam. It is one of 102 wards and communes in the province following the 2025 reorganization.

== Geography ==
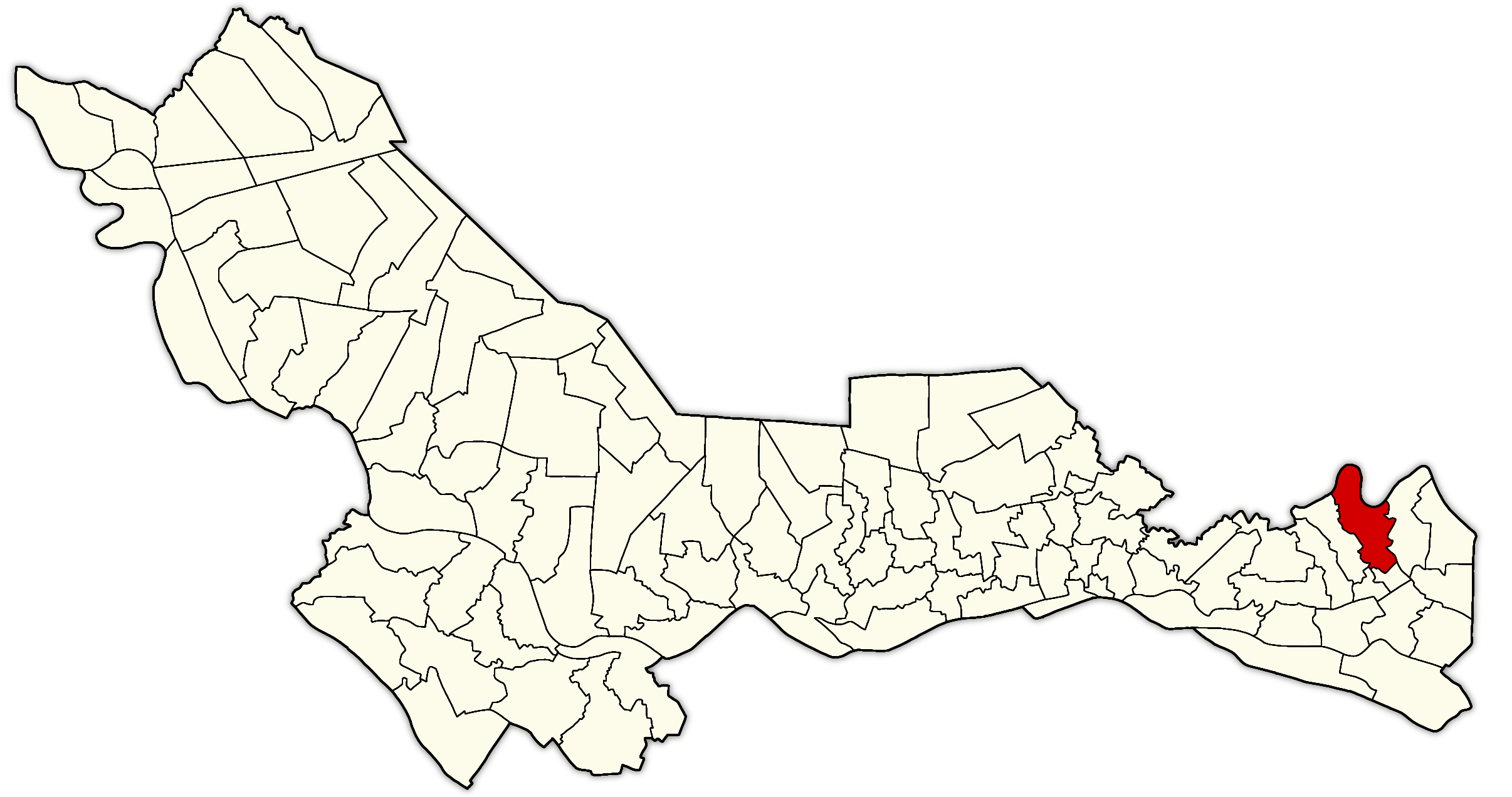
Location of Sơn Qui ward on the map of Đồng Tháp province (highlighted in red).

Sơn Qui is a ward located in the eastern part of Đồng Tháp province, 140km east of Cao Lãnh ward and 45km east of Mỹ Tho ward. The ward has a geographical location:

- To the north, it borders Tây Ninh province.
- To the west, it borders Bình Xuân ward.
- To the south, it borders two wards: Gò Công and Long Thuận.
- To the east, it borders Tân Đông commune.

== History ==
Prior to 2025, Sơn Qui ward was formerly Long Hưng ward, Tân Trung commune and Bình Đông commune belonging to Gò Công city, Tiền Giang province.

On June 12, 2025, the National Assembly of Vietnam issued Resolution No. 202/2025/QH15 on the reorganization of provincial-level administrative units. Accordingly:

- Đồng Tháp province was established by merging the entire area and population of Đồng Tháp province and Tiền Giang province.

On June 16, 2025, the Standing Committee of the National Assembly of Vietnam issued Resolution No. 1663/NQ-UBTVQH15 on the reorganization of commune-level administrative units in Đồng Tháp province. Accordingly:

- The Sơn Qui ward was established by merging the entire area and population of Long Hưng ward, Tân Trung commune, and Bình Đông commune (formerly part of Gò Công city; excerpt from Clause 91, Article 1).
