= Tân Điền =

- Commune
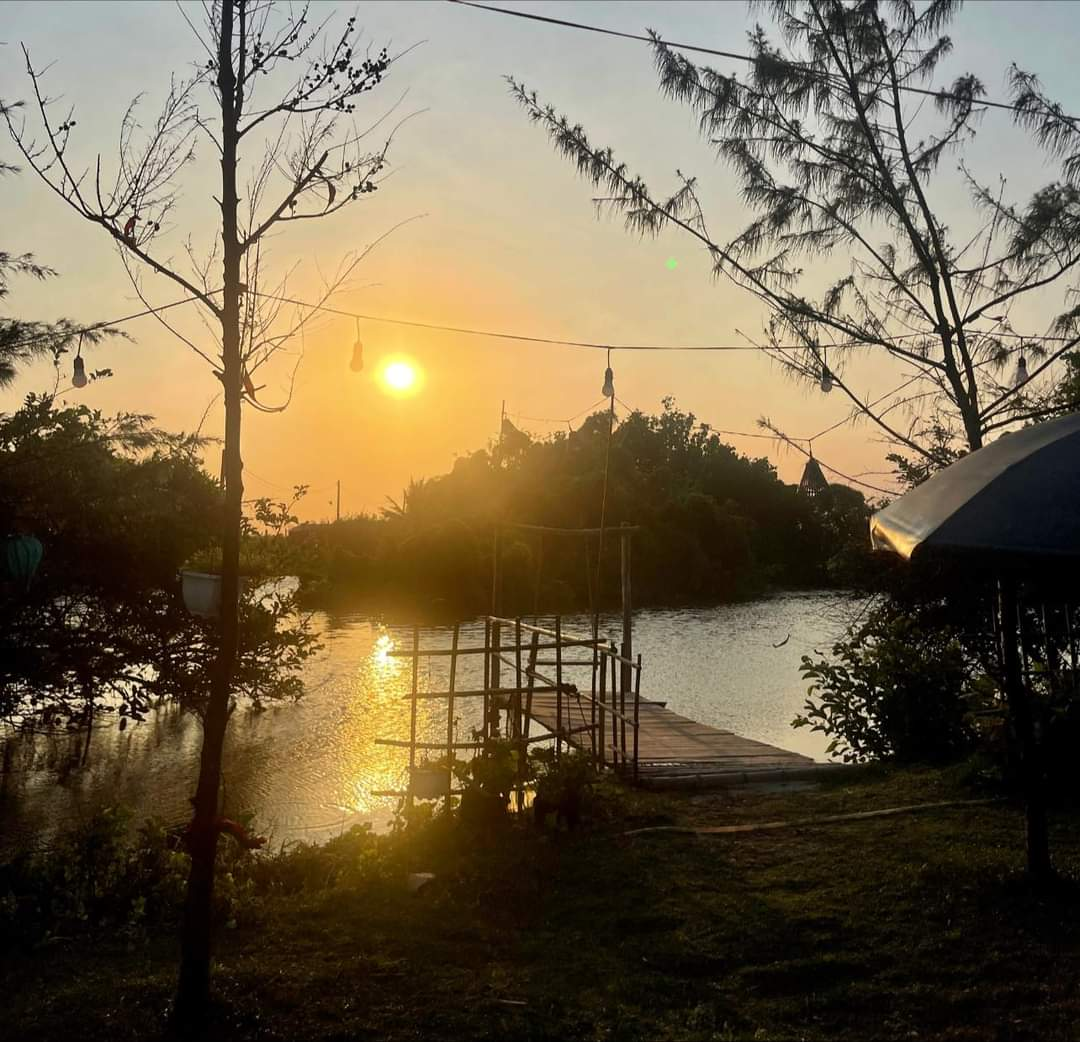
- Interactive map of Tân Điền
- Country: Vietnam
- Province: Đồng Tháp
- Establish: June 16, 2025

Area
  - Total: 39.01 km^{2} (15.06 sq mi)

Population (2025)
  - Total: 22,130 people
  - Density: 567.3/km^{2} (1,469/sq mi)
- Time zone: UTC+07:00

Tân Điền is a commune in Đồng Tháp province, Vietnam. It is one of 102 communes and wards in the province following the 2025 reorganization.

Tân Điền is one of the communes located in the easternmost part of Đồng Tháp province, along with Gia Thuận, Gò Công Đông, and Tân Phú Đông communes.

== Geography ==
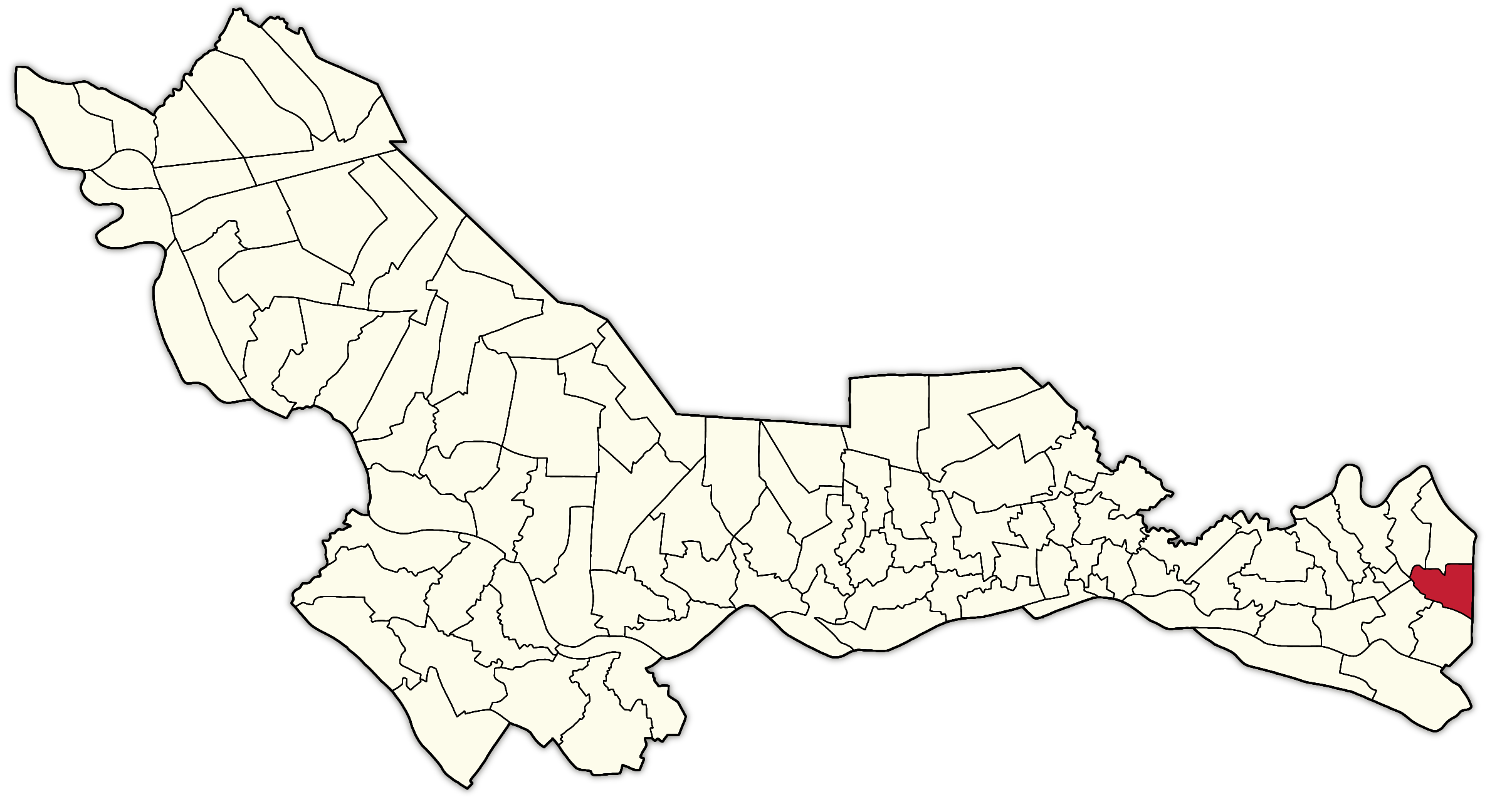
Location of Tân Điền commune in Đồng Tháp province map (highlight in red).

Tân Điền is a coastal commune located in the eastern part of Đồng Tháp province. The commune has the following geographical location:

- To the north, it borders Gia Thuận commune and Tân Đông commune.
- To the west, it borders Long Thuận ward.
- To the south, it borders Tân Hòa commune and Gò Công Đông commune.
- To the east, it borders the East Sea.

== History ==
Prior to 2025, Tân Điền commune was formerly Bình Ân commune and Tân Điền commune in Gò Công Đông district, Tiền Giang province.

On June 12, 2025, the National Assembly of Vietnam issued Resolution No. 202/2025/QH15 on the reorganization of provincial-level administrative units. Accordingly:

- Đồng Tháp province was established by merging the entire area and population of Đồng Tháp province and Tiền Giang province.

On June 16, 2025, the Standing Committee of the National Assembly of Vietnam issued Resolution No. 1663/NQ-UBTVQH15 on the reorganization of commune-level administrative units in Đồng Tháp province. Accordingly:

- Tân Điền commune was established by merging the entire area and population of Bình Ân commune and Tân Điền commune (formerly part of Gò Công Đông district).
