= Tân Hòa, Đồng Tháp =

Tân Hòa
- Commune
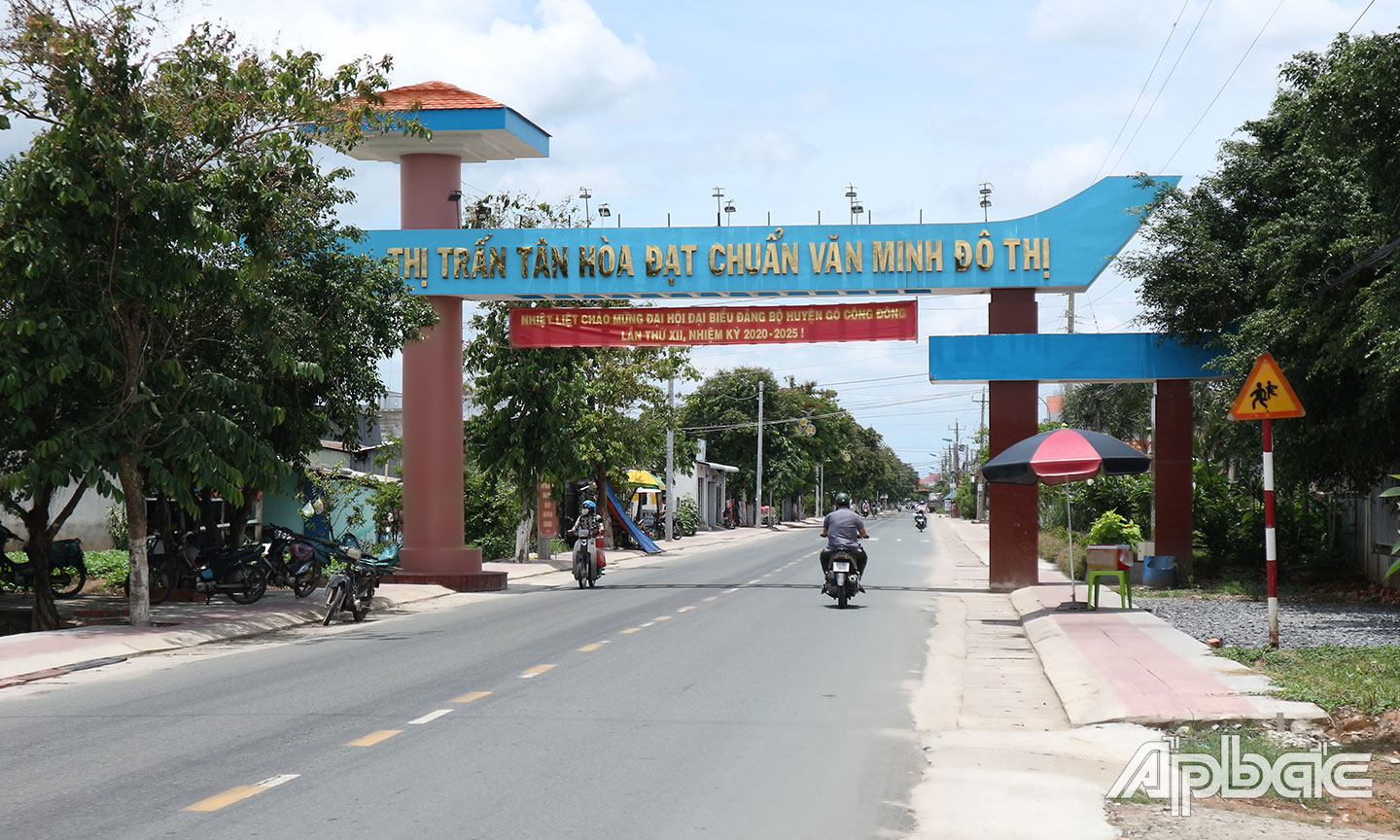
- Interactive map of Tân Hòa
- Country: Vietnam
- Province: Đồng Tháp
- Establish: June 16, 2025

Area
  - Total: 37.96 km^{2} (14.66 sq mi)

Population (2025)
  - Total: 34,149 people
  - Density: 899.6/km^{2} (2,330/sq mi)
- Time zone: UTC+07:00

Tân Hòa is a commune in Đồng Tháp province, Vietnam. It is one of 102 communes and wards in the province.

== Geography ==
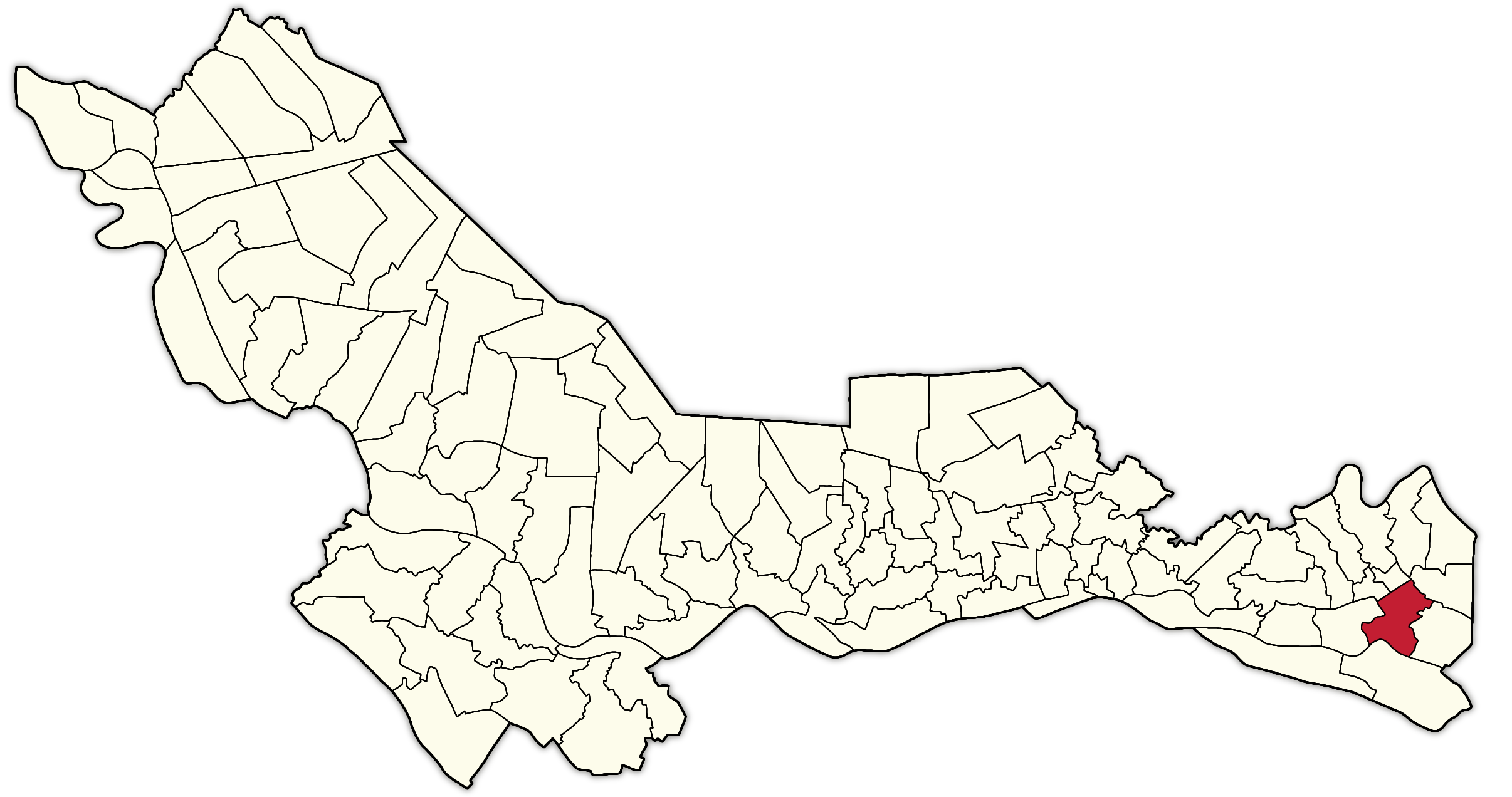
Location of Tân Hòa commune on Đồng Tháp province map (highlight in red).

Tân Hòa is a commune located in the eastern part of Đồng Tháp province. The commune has the following geographical location:

- To the east, it borders Gò Công Đông commune.
- To the north, it borders Long Thuận ward, Gò Công ward and Tân Điền commune.
- To the south, it borders Tân Phú Đông commune.
- To the west, it borders Long Bình commune.

== History ==
Prior to 2025, Tân Hòa commune was formerly Tân Hòa commune-level town and Phước Trung and Bình Nghị communes belonging to Gò Công Đông district, Tiền Giang province.

On June 12, 2025, the National Assembly of Vietnam issued Resolution No. 1663/NQ-UBTVQH15 on the reorganization of provincial-level administrative units. Accordingly:

- Đồng Tháp province was established by merging the entire area and population of Đồng Tháp province and Tiền Giang province.

On June 16, 2025, the Standing Committee of the National Assembly of Vietnam issued Resolution No. 1663/NQ-UBTVQH15 on the reorganization of commune-level administrative units in Đồng Tháp province. Accordingly:

- Tân Hòa commune was established by merging the entire area and population of Tân Hòa town, Phước Trung commune, and Bình Nghị commune (formerly part of Gò Công Đông district).
