= Tân Đông, Đồng Tháp =

Tân Đông
- Commune
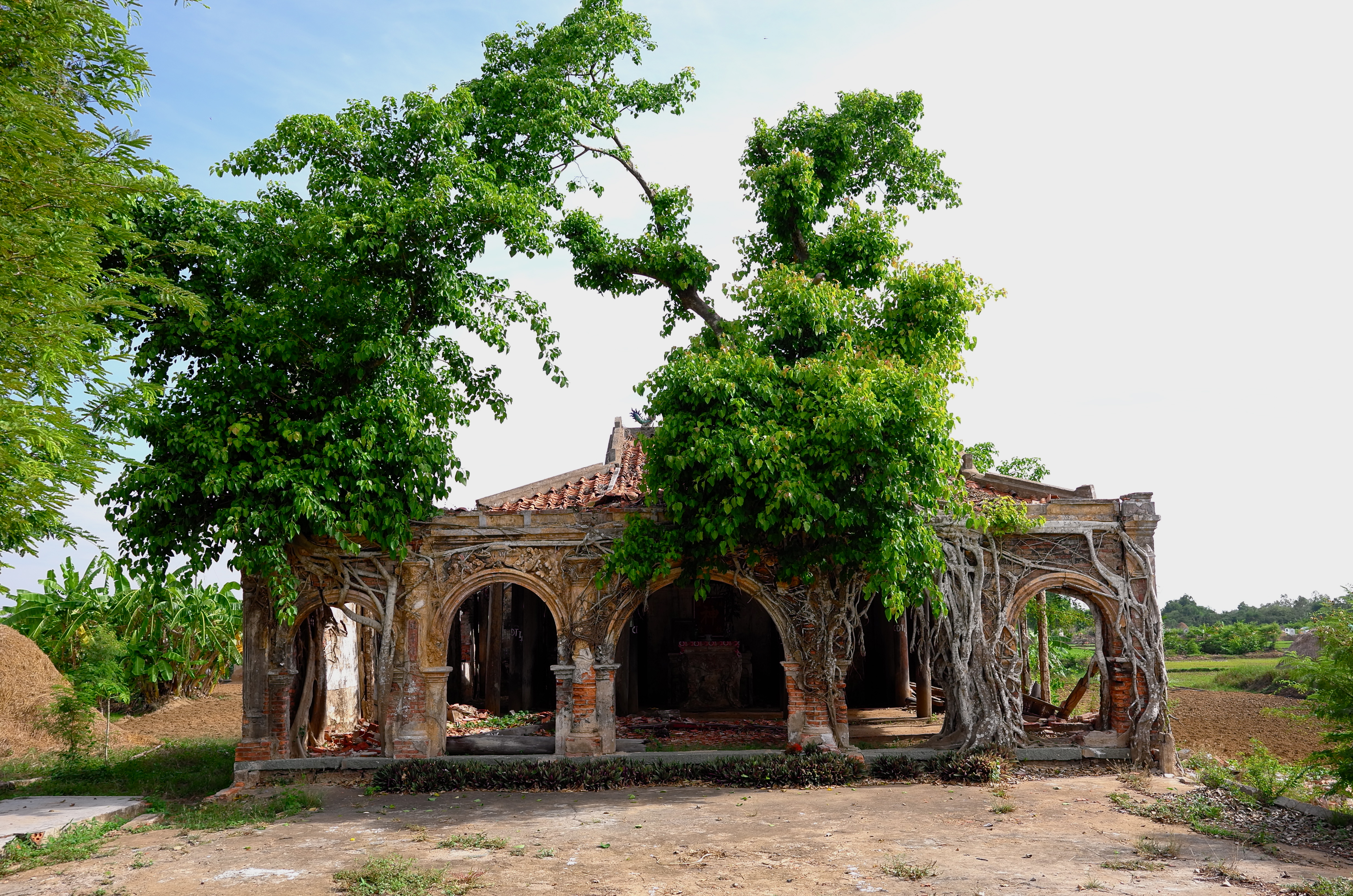
- Tân Đông Ancient Temple
- Interactive map of Tân Đông
- Country: Vietnam
- Province: Đồng Tháp
- Establish: June 16, 2025

Area
  - Total: 50.35 km^{2} (19.44 sq mi)

Population (2025)
  - Total: 51,413 people
  - Density: 1,021/km^{2} (2,645/sq mi)
- Time zone: UTC+07:00

Tân Đông is a commune in Đồng Tháp province, Vietnam. It is one of 102 communes and wards in the province.

== Geography ==
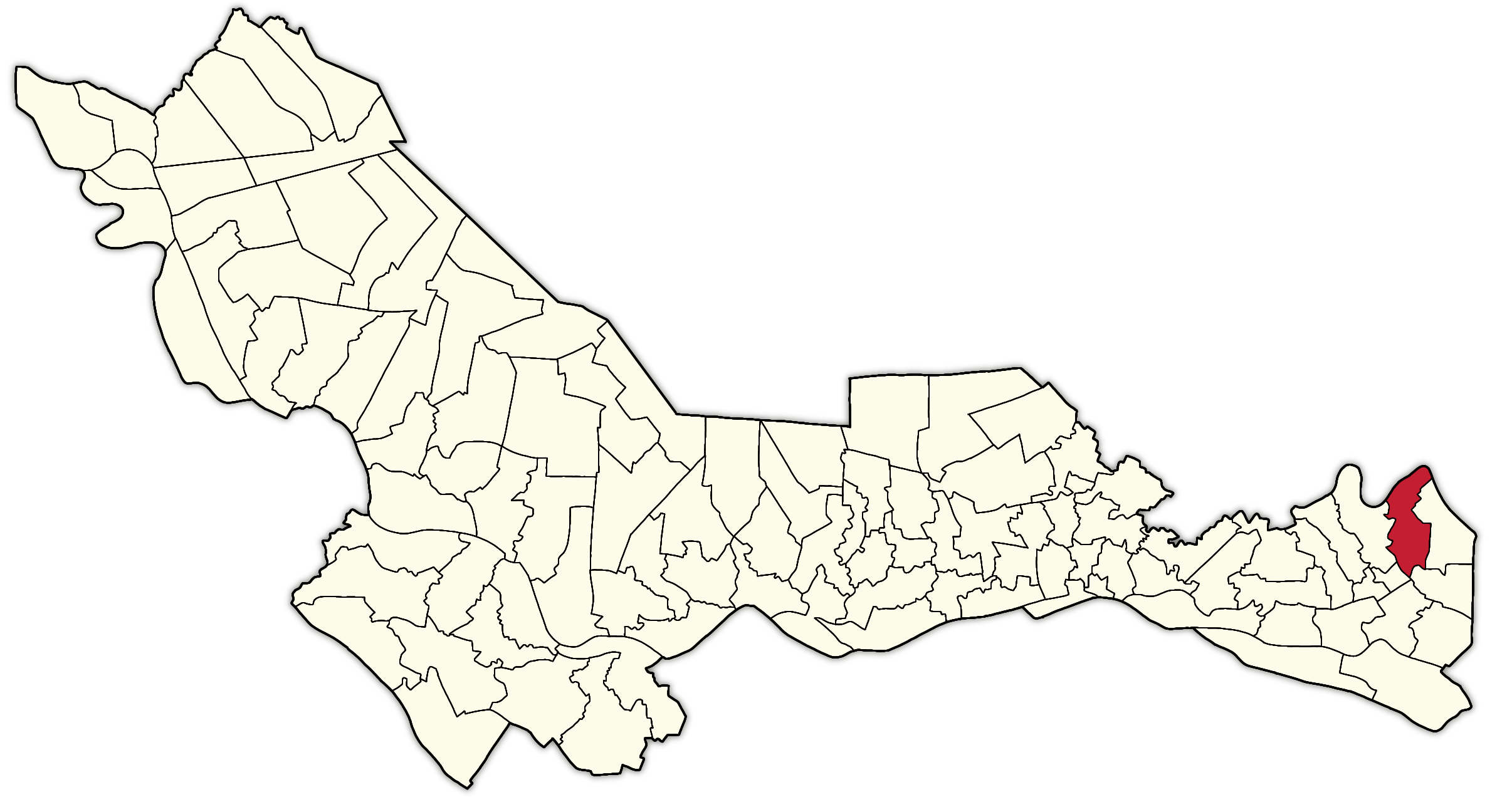
Location of Tân Đông commune on Đồng Tháp province map (highlight in red).

Tân Đông is a commune located in the eastern part of Đồng Tháp province. The commune has the following geographical location:

- To the east, it borders Gia Thuận commune.
- To the southeast, it borders Tân Điền commune.
- To the west, it borders Long Thuận ward and Sơn Qui ward.

== History ==
Prior to 2025, Tân Đông commune was formerly Tân Phước, Tân Tây, and Tân Đông communes belonging to Gò Công Đông district, Tiền Giang province.

On June 12, 2025, the National Assembly of Vietnam issued Resolution No. 202/2025/QH15 on the reorganization of provincial-level administrative units. Accordingly:

- Đồng Tháp province was established by merging the entire area and population of Đồng Tháp province and Tiền Giang province.

On June 16, 2025, the Standing Committee of the National Assembly of Vietnam issued Resolution No. 1663/NQ-UBTVQH15 on the reorganization of commune-level administrative units in Đồng Tháp province. Accordingly:

- Tân Đông commune was established by merging the entire area and population of Tân Phước, Tân Tây, and Tân Đông communes (formerly part of Gò Công Đông district).
