= Tân Phú district, Đồng Nai =

Coordinates: 11.2720°N 107.4367°E

Tân Phú district Huyện Tân Phú
- District
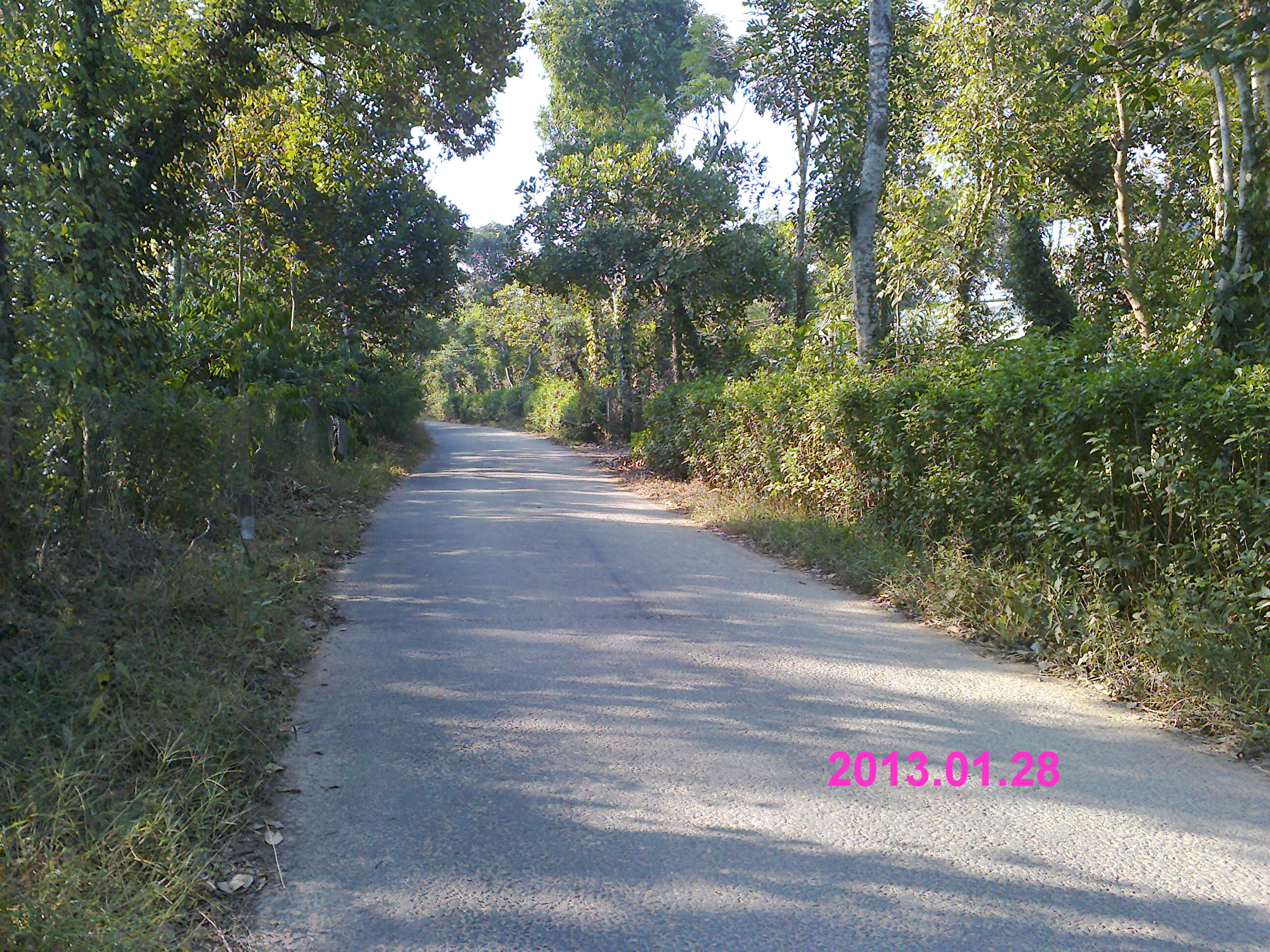
- Country Road in Tan Phu

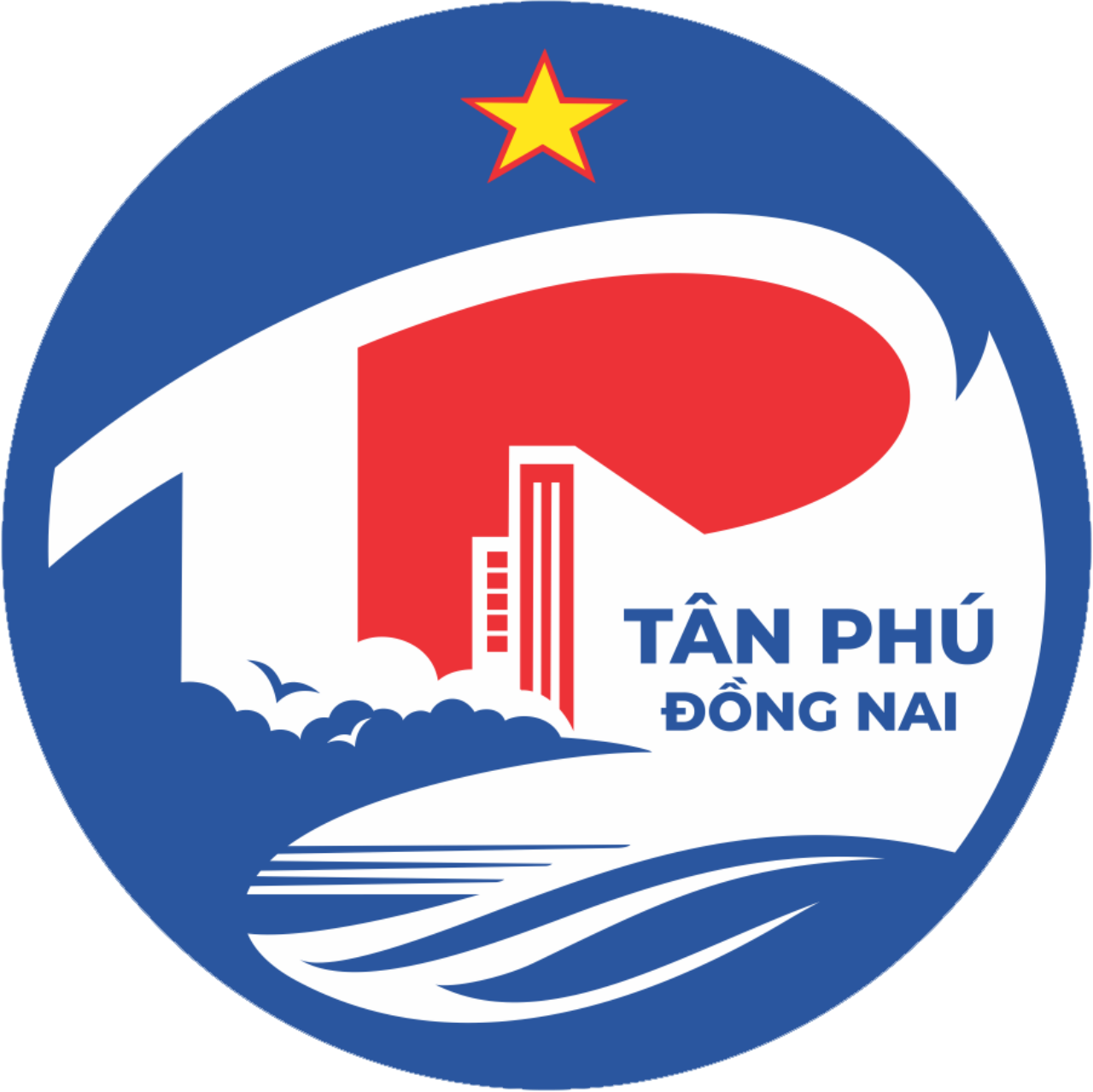
- Seal
- Interactive map of Tân Phú district
- Country: Vietnam
- Region: South East
- Province: Đồng Nai
- Capital: Tân Phú

Area
  - Total: 299 sq mi (774 km^{2})

Population (2019)
  - Total: 170,670
- Time zone: UTC+7 (Indochina Time)

Tân Phú was a district (huyện) of Đồng Nai province (now Đồng Nai municipality) in the Southeast region of Vietnam.

As of 2003 the district had a population of 164,366. The district covers an area of 774 km^{2} (299 sq mi). The district capital lies at Tân Phú.

== Administrative subdivisions ==
This district is mostly rural, with the following xã:

- Tân Phú town (thị trấn)
- Xã Đắc Lua
- Xã Nam Cát Tiên
- Xã Núi Tượng
- Xã Phú An
- Xã Phú Bình
- Xã Phú Điền
- Xã Phú Lâm
- Xã Phú Lập
- Xã Phú Lộc
- Xã Phú Sơn
- Xã Phú Thanh
- Xã Phú Thịnh
- Xã Phú Trung
- Xã Phú Xuân
- Xã Tà Lài
- Xã Thanh Sơn
- Xã Trà Cổ
