= Tân Phú Đông =

- Commune
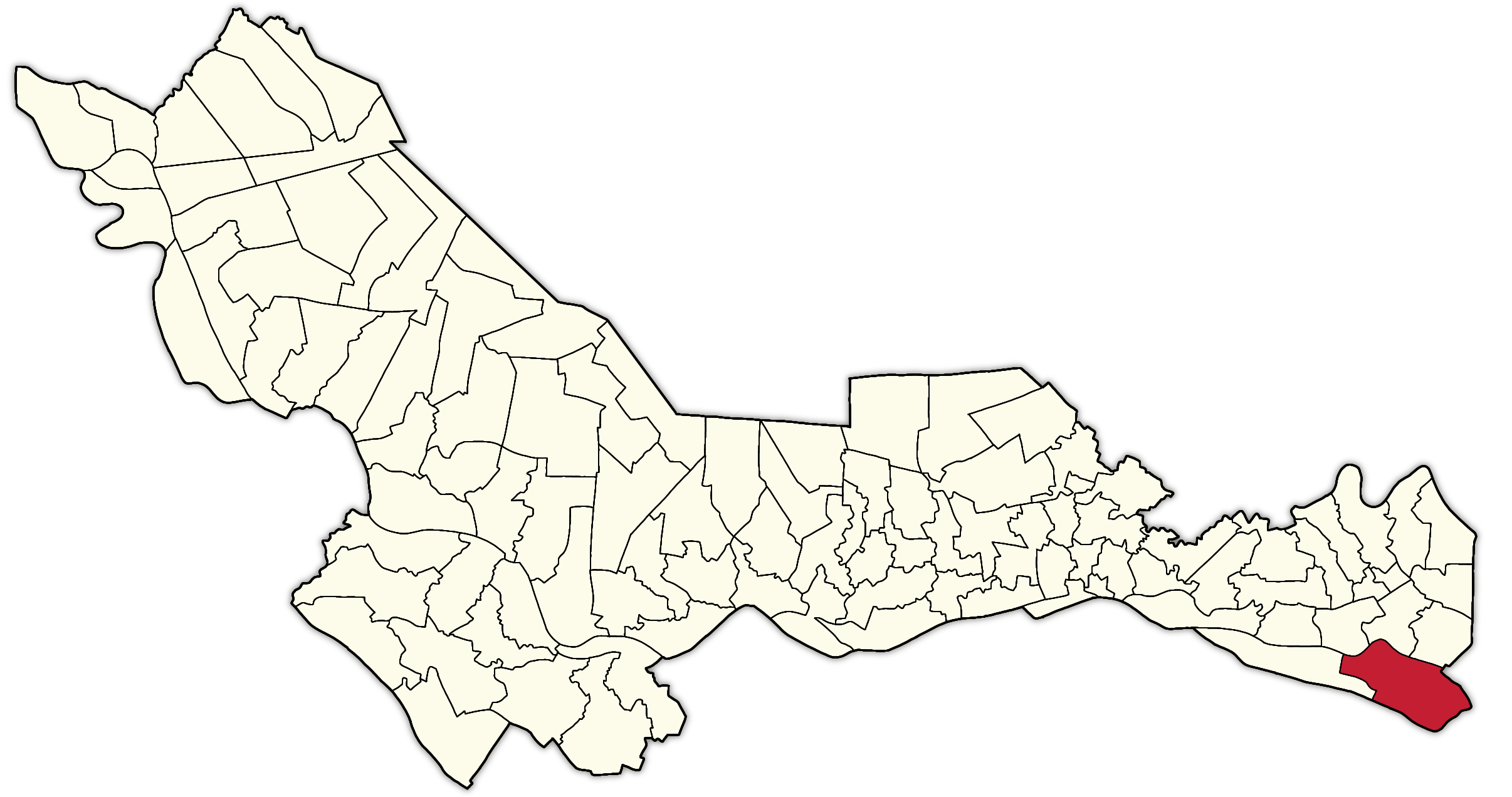
- Location of Tân Phú Đông commune on Đồng Tháp province map (highlight in red)
- Country: Vietnam
- Province: Đồng Tháp
- Establish: June 16, 2025

Area
  - Total: 175.15 km^{2} (67.63 sq mi)

Population (2025)
  - Total: 23,630 people
  - Density: 134.9/km^{2} (349.4/sq mi)
- Time zone: UTC+07:00

Tân Phú Đông is a commune in Đồng Tháp province, Vietnam. It is one of 102 communes and wards in the province following the 2025 reorganization.

This is one of the five island communes in Đồng Tháp province, along with Tân Thới, Tân Long, Long Khánh, and Long Phú Thuận communes.

And it is one of the communes located in the far east of Đồng Tháp province, along with Gò Công Đông commune, Tân Điền commune, and Gia Thuận commune.

== Geography ==
Tân Phú Đông is a commune located in the eastern part of Đồng Tháp province. The commune has the following geographical location:

- To the north, it borders Gò Công Đông commune, Tân Hòa commune, and Vĩnh Hựu commune.
- To the east, it borders the East Sea.
- To the south, it borders Vĩnh Long province.
- To the west, it borders Tân Thới commune.

== History ==
Prior to 2025, Tân Phú Đông commune consisted of Phú Thạnh, Phú Đông, and Phú Tân communes in Tân Phú Đông district, Tiền Giang province.

On June 12, 2025, the National Assembly of Vietnam issued Resolution No. 202/2025/QH15 on the reorganization of provincial-level administrative units. Accordingly:

- Đồng Tháp province was established by merging the entire area and population of Đồng Tháp province and Tiền Giang province.

On June 16, 2025, the Standing Committee of the National Assembly of Vietnam issued Resolution No. 1663/NQ-UBTVQH15 on the reorganization of commune-level administrative units in Đồng Tháp province. Accordingly:

- Tân Phú Đông commune was established by merging the entire area and population of Phú Thạnh, Phú Đông, and Phú Tân communes (formerly part of Tân Phú Đông district).
