= Long Thuận, Đồng Tháp =

Long Thuận
- Ward
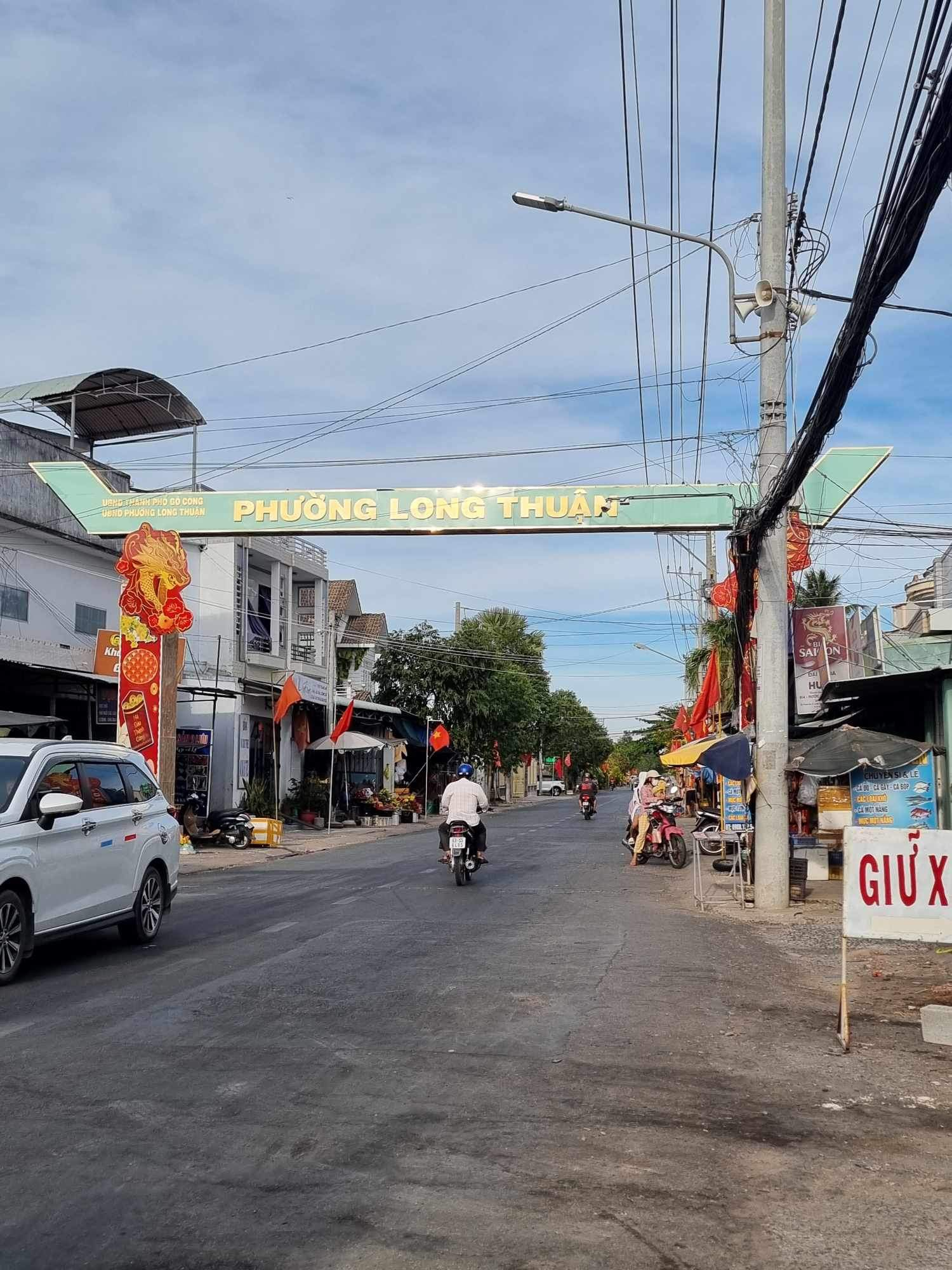
- Entrance gate to Long Thuận ward
- Interactive map of Long Thuận
- Country: Vietnam
- Province: Đồng Tháp
- Establish: June 16, 2025

Area
  - Total: 8.3 km^{2} (3.2 sq mi)

Population (2025)
  - Total: 29,715 people
  - Density: 3,600/km^{2} (9,300/sq mi)

Long Thuận is a ward in Đồng Tháp province, Vietnam. It is one of 102 communes and wards in the province following the 2025 reorganization.

== Geography ==
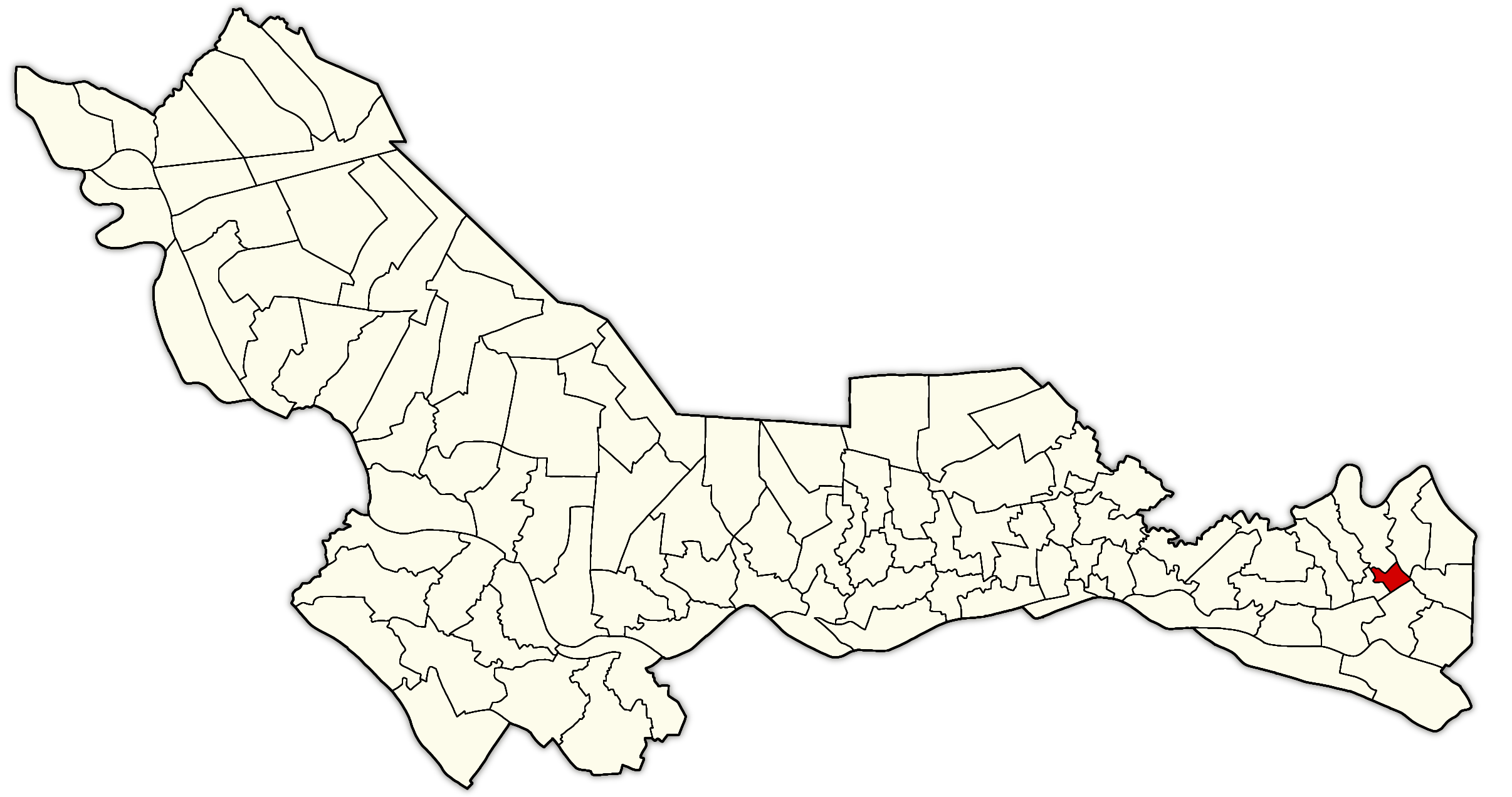
Location of Long Thuận ward in Đồng Tháp province map (highlight in red).

Long Thuận is a ward located in the eastern part of Đồng Tháp province, 40km east of Mỹ Tho ward and about 140km east of Cao Lãnh ward. The ward has a geographical location:

- To the west, it borders Gò Công ward.
- To the north, it borders Sơn Qui ward and Tân Đông commune.
- To the east, it borders Tân Điền commune.
- To the south, it borders Tân Hòa commune.

== History ==
Before 2025, Long Thuận ward was formerly Ward 2 and Long Thuận ward belonging to Gò Công city, Tiền Giang province.

On June 12, 2025, the National Assembly of Vietnam issued Resolution No. 202/2025/QH15 on the reorganization of provincial-level administrative units. Accordingly:

- Đồng Tháp province was established by merging the entire area and population of Đồng Tháp province and Tiền Giang province.

On June 16, 2025, the Standing Committee of the National Assembly of Vietnam issued Resolution No. 1663/NQ-UBTVQH15 on the reorganization of commune-level administrative units in Đồng Tháp province, accordingly:

- Long Thuận ward was established by merging the entire area and population of Ward 2 and Long Thuận ward (belonging to Gò Công city; excerpt from Clause 89, Article 1).
