= Tân Phú, Đồng Nai =

Tân Phú Phường Tân Phú
- Ward
- Interactive map of Tân Phú
- Coordinates: 11°16′10″N 107°25′40″E
- Country: Vietnam
- Municipality: Đồng Nai
- Established: June 16, 2025

Area
  - Total: 40.85 sq mi (105.81 km^{2})

Population (2024)
  - Total: 76,765
  - Density: 1,879.0/sq mi (725.50/km^{2})
- Time zone: UTC+07:00 (Indochina Time)
- Administrative code: 26116

Tân Phú (Vietnamese: Phường Tân Phú) is a ward of Đồng Nai, Vietnam. It is one of the 95 new wards, communes and special zones of the province following the reorganization in 2025.

== History ==
On June 16, 2025, the National Assembly Standing Committee issued Resolution No. 1662/NQ-UBTVQH15 on the arrangement of commune-level administrative units of Đồng Nai province in 2025 (effective from June 16, 2025). Accordingly, the entire land area and population of Tân Phú township and Phú Lộc, Trà Cổ, Phú Thanh, Phú Xuân communes of the former Tân Phú district will be integrated into a new commune named Tân Phú (Clause 34, Article 1).
