= An Thới Đông =

An Thới Đông Xã An Thới Đông Quảng Xuyên, Lý Nhơn
- Commune
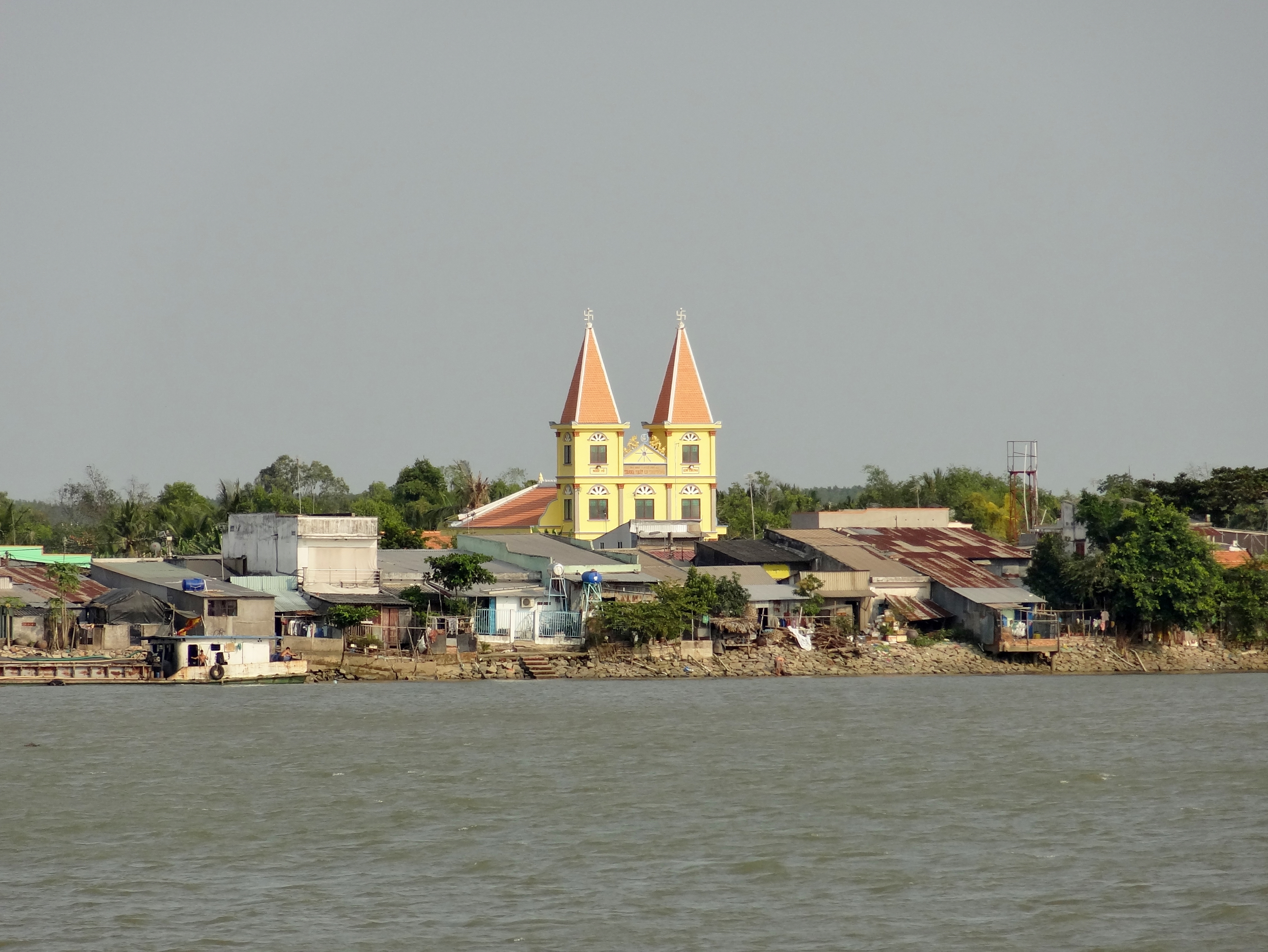
- A neighborhood of An Thới Đông with the Cao Dai Temple in the background, as seen from the Nhà Bè River
- Interactive map of An Thới Đông
- Coordinates: 10°35′27″N 106°47′29″E
- Country: Vietnam
- Municipality: Ho Chi Minh City
- Established: June 16, 2025

Area
  - Total: 99.56 sq mi (257.85 km^{2})

Population (2024)
  - Total: 22,607
  - Density: 227.08/sq mi (87.675/km^{2})
- Time zone: UTC+07:00 (Indochina Time)
- Administrative code: 27673

An Thới Đông (Vietnamese: Xã An Thới Đông) is a commune of Ho Chi Minh City, Vietnam. It is one of the 168 new wards, communes and special zones of the city following the reorganization in 2025.

== History ==
On June 16, 2025, the National Assembly Standing Committee issued Resolution No. 1685/NQ-UBTVQH15 on the arrangement of commune-level administrative units of Ho Chi Minh City in 2025 (effective from June 16, 2025). Accordingly, the entire land area and population of Lý Nhơn commune and the majority of An Thới Đông commune of the former Cần Giờ district will be integrated into a new commune named An Thới Đông (Clause 121, Article 1).
