= Nhuận Phú Tân =

Nhuận Phú Tân Xã Nhuận Phú Tân
- Commune and village
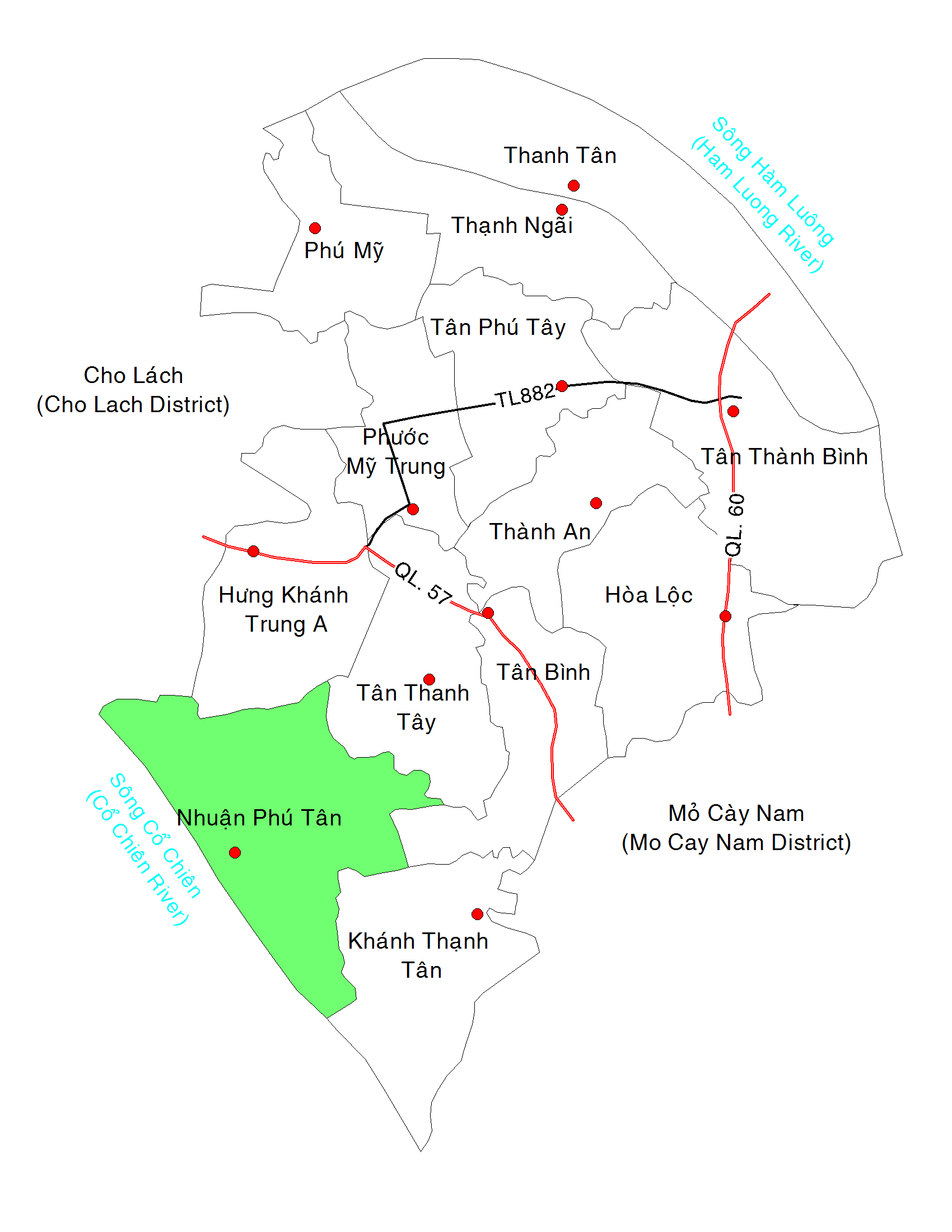
- Location in Mo Cay Bac District

- Location within Vietnam
- Coordinates: 10°7′34″N 106°14′49″E
- Country: Vietnam
- Region: Mekong Delta
- Province: Vĩnh Long

Area
  - Total: 7.13 sq mi (18.47 km^{2})

Population (1999)
  - Total: 13,136
  - Density: 1,840/sq mi (711/km^{2})
- Time zone: UTC+07:00 (Indochina Time)
- Postal code: 28936

Nhuận Phú Tân is a rural commune of Vĩnh Long Province, Vietnam. The commune covers 18.47 km^{2}, with a population of 13,136 in 1999, and a population density of 711 inhabitants/km^{2}.
