= Tân Phú Đông district =

Tân Phú Đông
- District
- Location within Vietnam
- Coordinates: 10°19′N 106°45′E
- Country: Vietnam
- Region: Mekong Delta
- Province: Tiền Giang
- Capital: Phú Thạnh commune

Area
  - Total: 78.02 sq mi (202.08 km^{2})

Population (2008)
  - Total: 42,926
- Time zone: UTC+7 (UTC + 7)

Tân Phú Đông is a new rural district (huyện) of Tiền Giang province in the Mekong Delta region of Vietnam. This district located in an islet named "Lợi Quan" of the Mekong River. It was established in 2008 and is the poorest district in Tiền Giang Province. Its territory came from split of Gò Công Đông district and Gò Công Tây district.

Tân Phú Đông is subdivided into 6 communes:

- Phú Đông
- Phú Tân
- Phú Thạnh
- Tân Thới
- Tân Phú
- Tân Thạnh
