= Hưng Khánh Trung =

Hưng Khánh Trung Xã Hưng Khánh Trung
- Commune and village
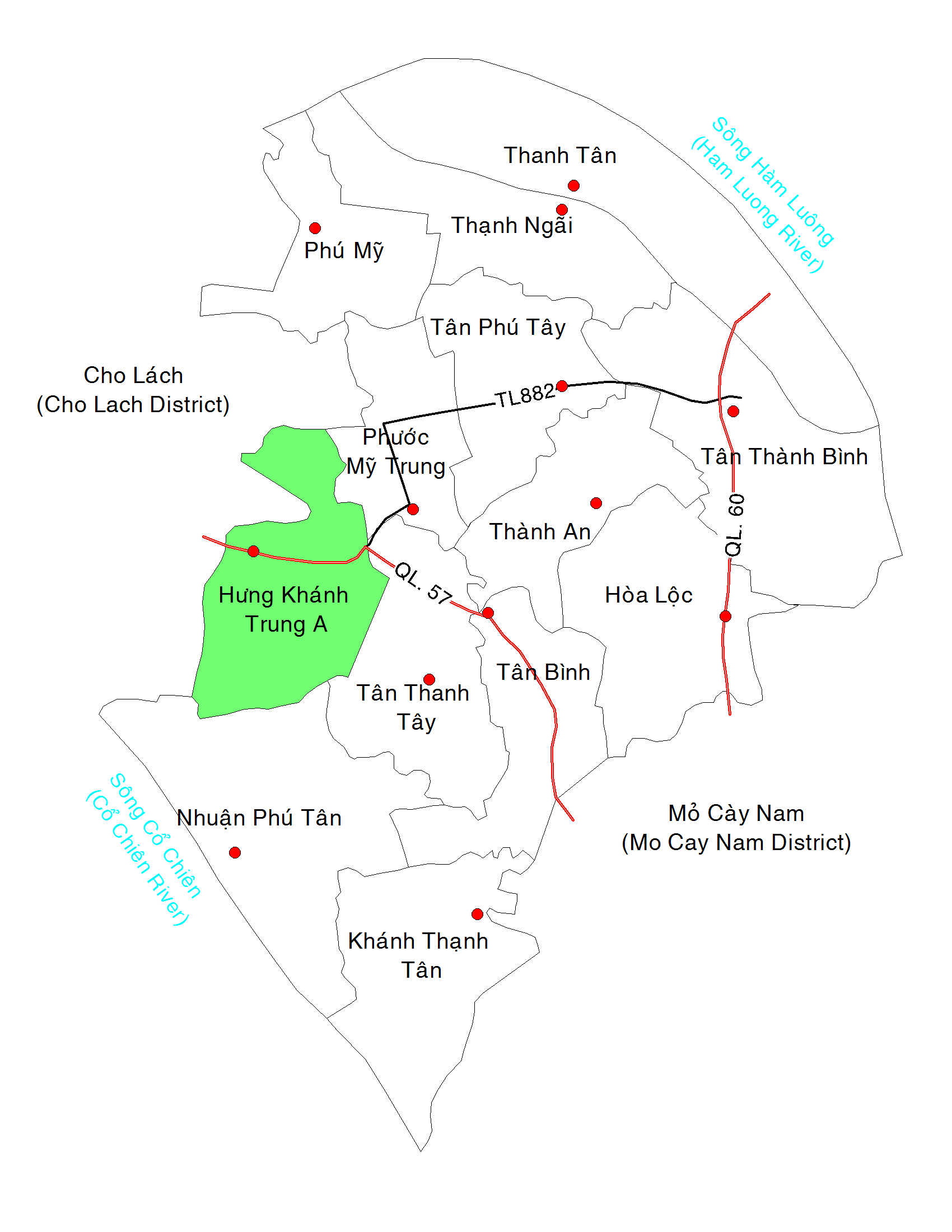
- Location in Mỏ Cày Bắc District
- Country: Vietnam
- Region: Mekong Delta
- Province: Vĩnh Long

Area
  - Total: 13.32 km^{2} (5.14 sq mi)

Population (1999)
  - Total: 8,760
  - Density: 658/km^{2} (1,700/sq mi)
- Time zone: UTC+7 (UTC + 7)
- Postal code: 28901

Hưng Khánh Trung is a commune (xã) of Vĩnh Long Province, Vietnam. The commune covers an area of 13.32 km². In 1999 it had a population of 8,760.
