= Tân Thành Bình =

Tân Thành Bình Xã Tân Thành Bình
- Commune and Village
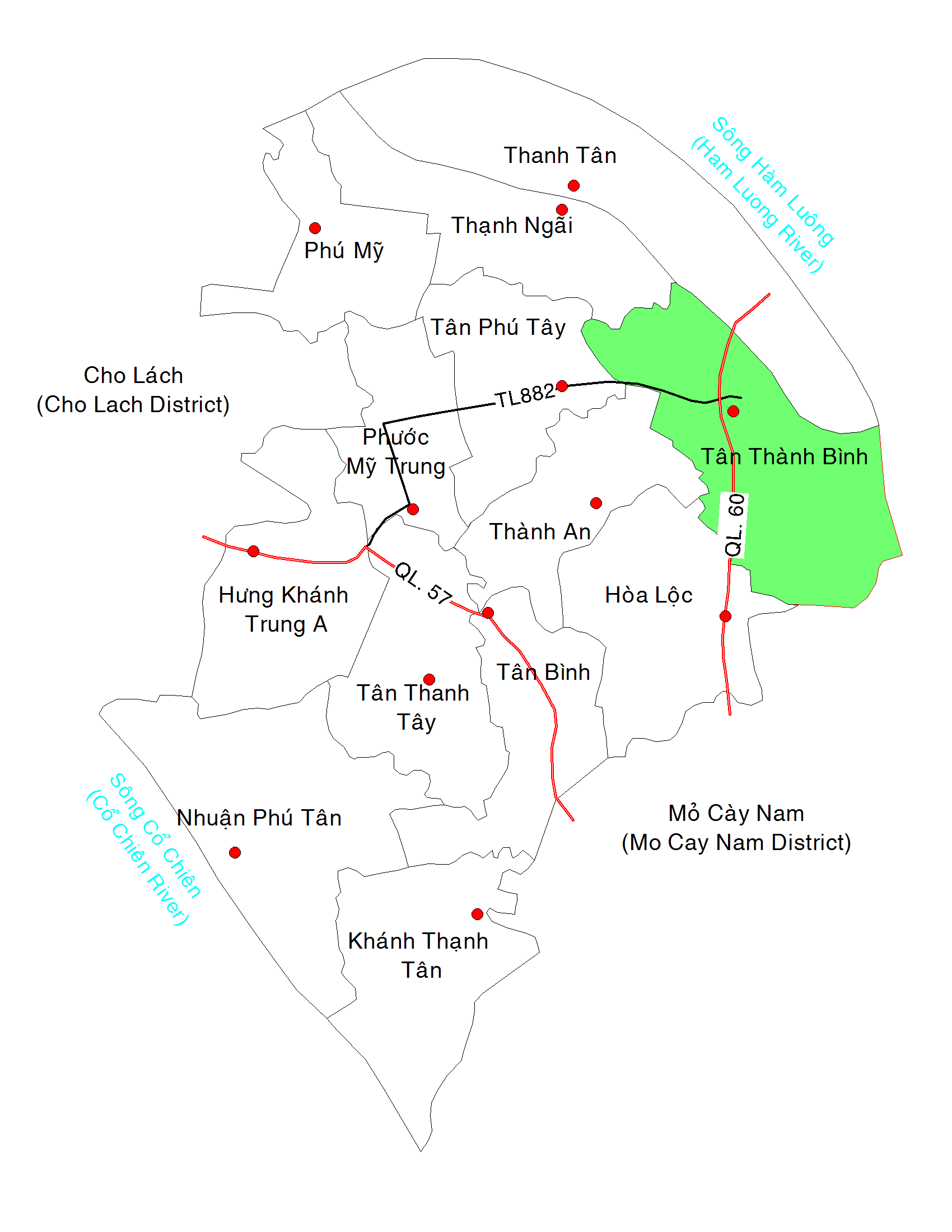
- Location in Mỏ Cày Bắc District

- Location within Vietnam
- Coordinates: 10°11′45″N 106°19′53″E
- Country: Vietnam
- Region: Mekong Delta
- Province: Vĩnh Long

Area
  - Total: 7.08 sq mi (18.33 km^{2})

Population (1999)
  - Total: 12,968
  - Density: 1,830/sq mi (707/km^{2})
- Time zone: UTC+07:00 (Indochina Time)
- Postal code: 28918

Tân Thành Bình is a rural commune of Vĩnh Long Province, Vietnam. The commune covers 18.33 km^{2}, with a population of 12,968 in 1999, and a population density of 707 inhabitants/km^{2}.
