= Phước Mỹ Trung =

Phước Mỹ Trung Xã Phước Mỹ Trung
- Commune and village
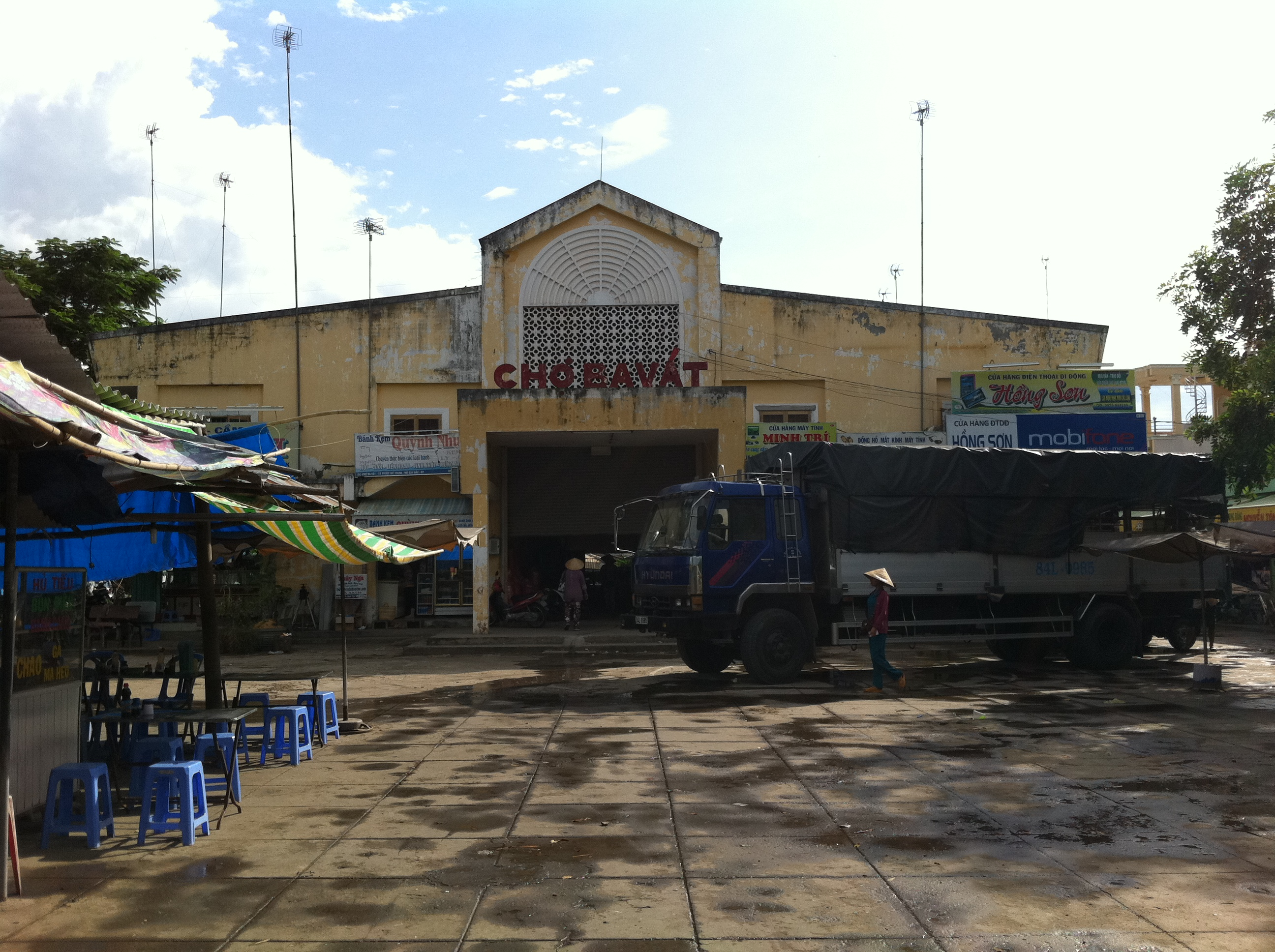
- Ba Vat market

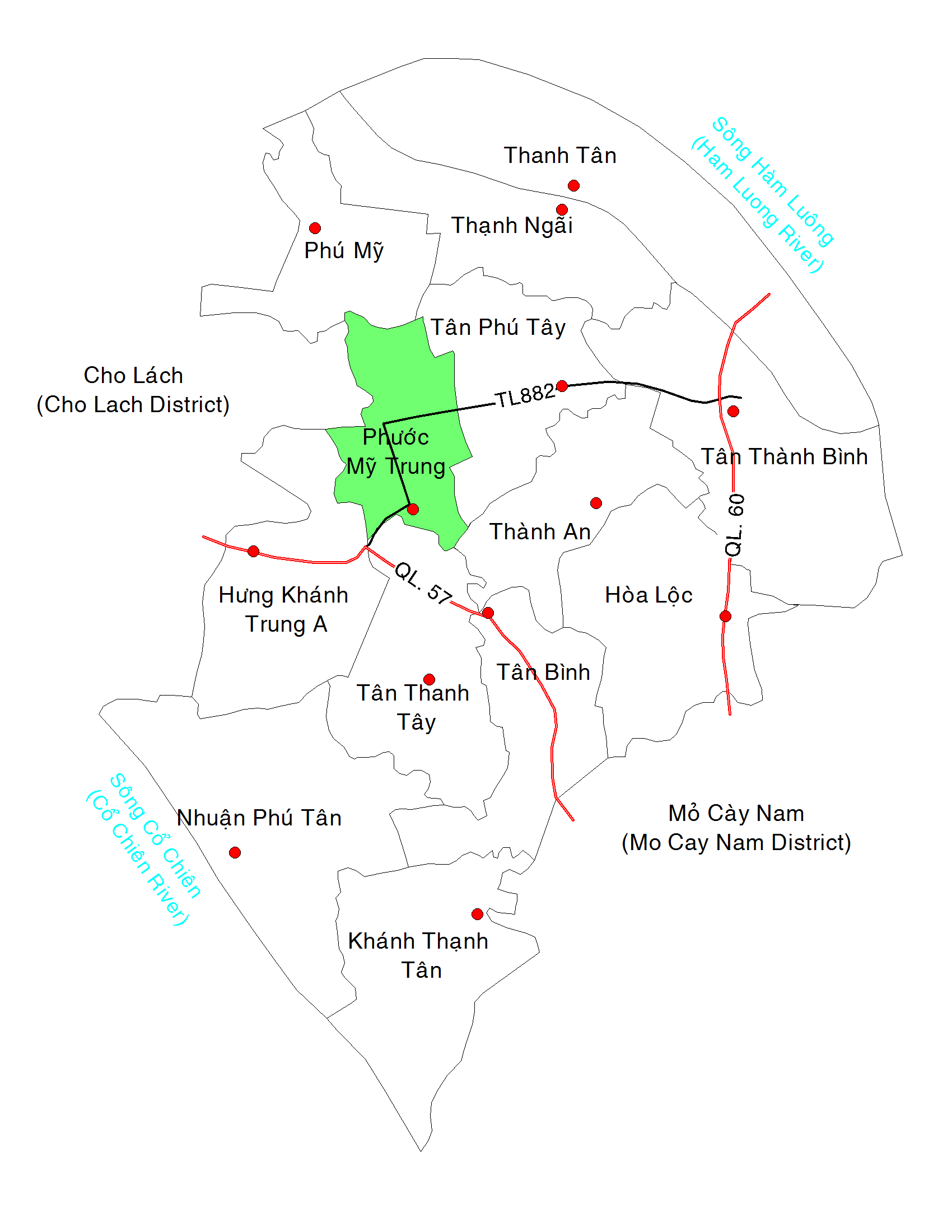
- Location in Mỏ Cày Bắc District

- Location within Vietnam Location within Southeast Asia Location within Asia
- Coordinates: 10°11′55″N 106°16′16″E
- Country: Vietnam
- Region: Mekong Delta
- Province: Vĩnh Long

Area
  - Total: 3.63 sq mi (9.41 km^{2})

Population (2013)
  - Total: 11,315
  - Density: 3,110/sq mi (1,202/km^{2})
- Time zone: UTC+07:00 (Indochina Time)
- Postal code: 28915

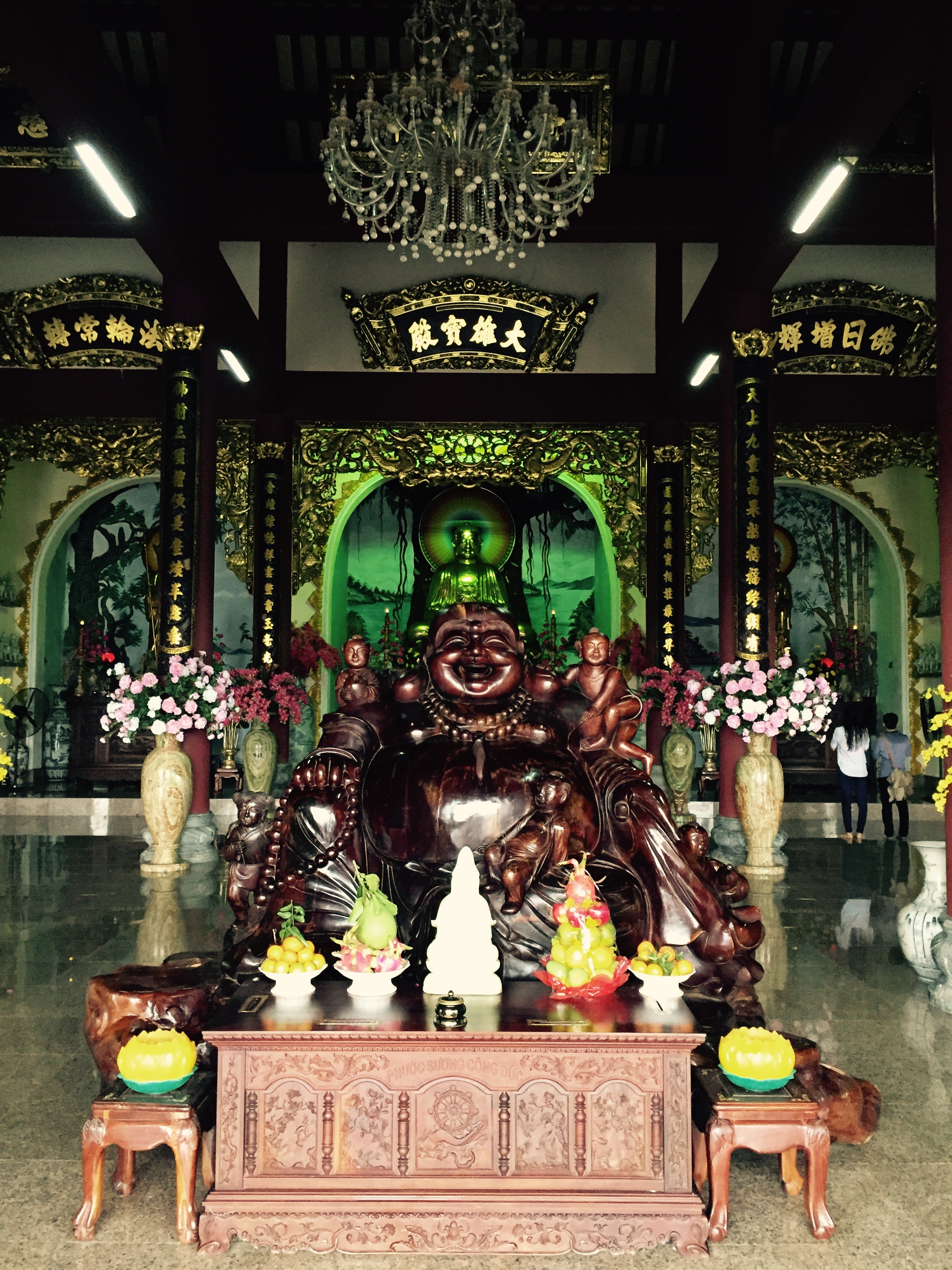
Temple in Phan Rang–Tháp Chàm

Phước Mỹ Trung is a rural commune of Vĩnh Long Province, Vietnam. The commune covers 8.25 km^{2}, with a population of 7,303 in 1999, and a population density of 885 inhabitants/km^{2}. It is a seat of Mỏ Cày Bắc District.
