= Kiến Phong province =

Former province of Vietnam (1956 – 1976)

Kiến Phong
- Province
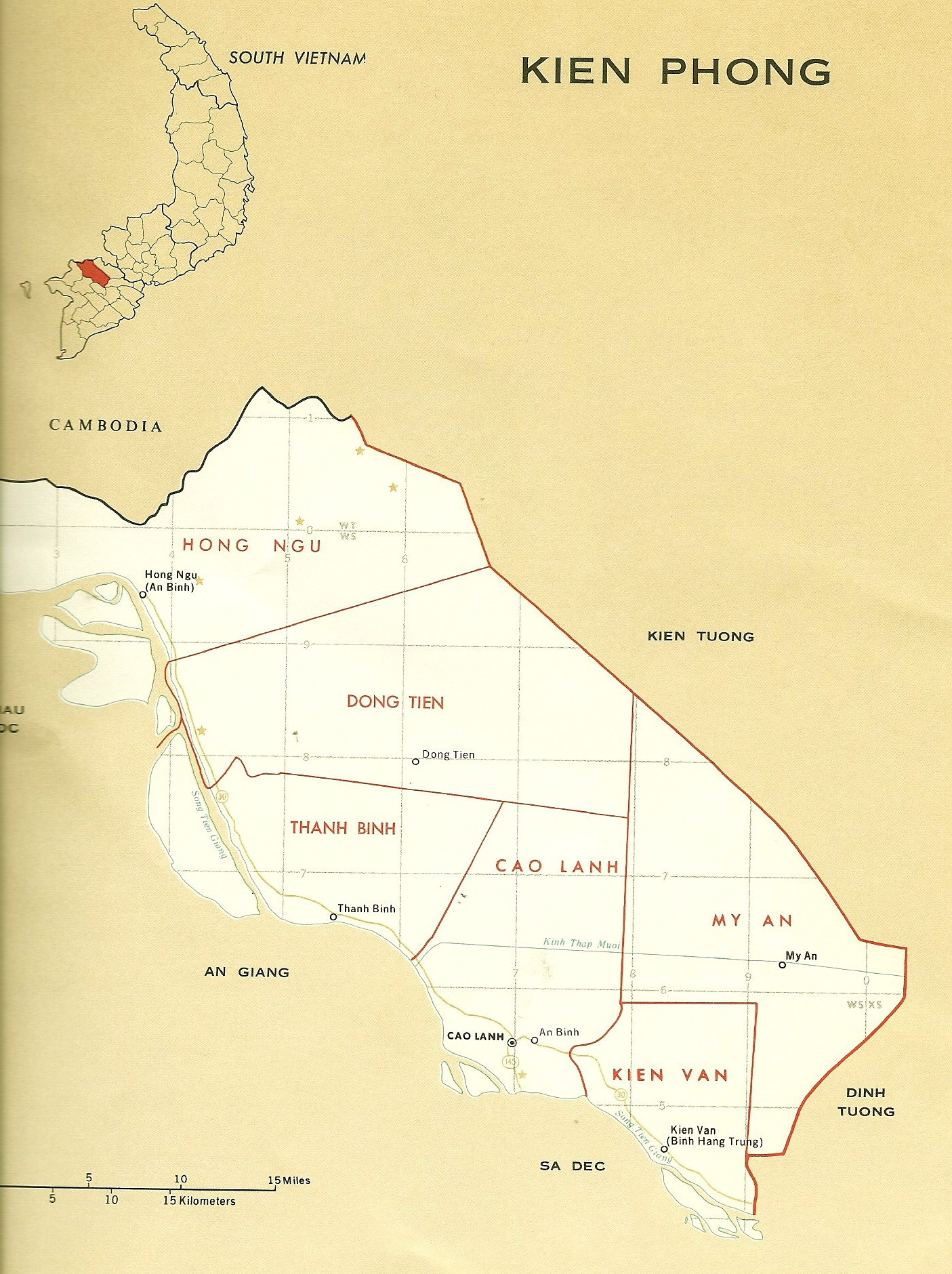
- Kiến Phong province map
- Country: Republic of Vietnam (1956 – 1975); Republic of South Vietnam (1975 – 1976)
- Established: October 22, 1956
- Dissolution: February 24, 1976
- Capital: Cao Lãnh district-level town
- Subdivisions: 1 district-level town 6 districts

Area
  - Total: 2,657.30 km^{2} (1,025.99 sq mi)

Population (1975)
  - Total: 445,599
  - Density: 167.689/km^{2} (434.312/sq mi)

Kiến Phong (Oct. 22, 1956 – Feb. 24, 1976) was a former province of the Republic of Vietnam (1956 – 1975) and the Republic of South Vietnam (1975 – 1976). It is now a part of Đồng Tháp province).

== History ==
=== Period 1956 – 1976 ===
On October 22, 1956, President Ngô Đình Diệm of the Republic of Vietnam issued Decree No. 143-NV (Note: Sắc lệnh số 143-NV về việc để thay đổi địa giới và tên Đô thành Sài Gòn – Chợ Lớn cùng các tỉnh và tỉnh lỵ tại Việt Nam. Địa giới và địa danh các tỉnh ở miền Nam thay đổi nhiều, một số tỉnh mới được thành lập. Theo Sắc lệnh này, địa phận Việt Nam Cộng hòa gồm Đô thành Sài Gòn và 22 tỉnh.) concerning:

- Kiến Phong province was established by renaming Phong Thạnh province.
- The capital of Kiến Phong province is Cao Lãnh, and administratively it belongs to Mỹ Trà commune, Cao Lãnh district.

By 1957, Kiến Phong province had 4 districts, 8 canton and 43 commune.

Subdivisions of Kiến Phong province
District	District capital	Canton
Cao Lãnh	Mỹ Trà commune	An Tịnh; Phong Thạnh; Phong Nẫm
Hồng Ngự	An Bình commune	An Phước; Long Phú; Tân Bình
Thanh Bình	Tân Phú commune	Phong Thạnh Thượng
Mỹ An	Mỹ An commune	Mỹ An

On July 21, 1960, Kiến Phong province had 4 districts, 10 cantons, and 43 communes.

Subdivisions of Kiến Phong province
District	Administrative changes
Cao Lãnh	An Tịnh; Phong Thạnh; Phong Nẫm
Hồng Ngự	Hồng Ân canton (renamed from An Phước canton); Hồng Phước canton (renamed from Long Phú canton); Hồng Quang canton (renamed from Tân Bình canton)
Thanh Bình	The district capital was moved from Tân Phú commune to An Phong commune.; Divide Phong Thạnh Thượng canton into two cantons: Thanh Liêm and Thanh Khiết.
Mỹ An	Divide Mỹ An canton into two cantons: Mỹ Đức and Mỹ Phước.

On July 13, 1961, Kiến Văn district was established by separating a part of Cao Lãnh district, with the district capital located in Bình Hàng Trung commune. Kiến Văn district comprises the entire Phong Nẫm canton (6 communes) and 1 commune (formerly part of An Tịnh canton). Later, Đồng Tiến district was established by separating land from Thanh Bình district.
