= Tân Long =

Tân Long could be one of the following locations in Vietnam:

- Tân Long: commune in Cần Thơ municipality.
- Tân Long: commune in Đồng Tháp province.
- Tân Long: commune in Tây Ninh province.
- Tân Long: commune in Tuyên Quang province.

Historical places with this name include:

- Tân Long: ward of Thái Nguyên provincial city in Thái Nguyên province (today part of Quan Triều ward, Thái Nguyên province).
- Tân Long: ward of Mỹ Tho provincial city in Tiền Giang province (today part of Mỹ Tho ward, Đồng Tháp province).
- Tân Long: commune in Ngã Năm district-level town of Sóc Trăng province (today part of Tân Long commune, Cần Thơ municipality).
- Tân Long: commune of Phú Giáo district, Bình Dương province (today part of An Long commune, Ho Chi Minh City).
- Tân Long: commune of Thanh Bình district in Đồng Tháp province (today part of Tân Long commune, Đồng Tháp province).
- Tân Long: commune in Phụng Hiệp district of Hậu Giang province (today part of Thạnh Hòa commune, Cần Thơ municipality).
- Tân Long: commune in Thủ Thừa district, Long An province (today part of Tân Long commune, Tây Ninh province).
- Tân Long: commune in Tân Kỳ district, Nghệ An province (today part of Tân Phú commune, Nghệ An province).
- Tân Long: commune in Yên Lập district, Phú Thọ province (today part of Yên Lập commune, Phú Thọ province).
- Tân Long: commune in Hướng Hóa district, Quảng Trị province (today part of Lao Bảo commune, Quảng Trị province).
- Tân Long: commune in Đồng Hỷ district, Thái Nguyên province (today part of Quang Sơn commune, Thái Nguyên province).
- Tân Long: commune in Yên Sơn district, Tuyên Quang province (today part of Tân Long commune, Tuyên Quang province).
- Tân Long: commune in Mang Thít district, Vĩnh Long province (today part of Tân Long Hội commune, Vĩnh Long province).
