= Tam Nong High School =

Tam Nong high school
- Trường Trung học phổ thông Tam Nông

Location
- Tam Nông district, Đồng Tháp; Vietnam
- Coordinates: 10.4141°N 105.2252°E

Information
- Type: Public
- Established: 1983
- Principal: Phan Văn Trung
- Grades: 10-12
- Enrollment: 1,000
- Area: 24.654 sq. meter

Tam Nong High School (Vietnamese: Trường Trung học phổ thông Tam Nông), one of the four public high schools in Tam Nong, was founded in 1984. It is located in Tam Nong district, Dong Thap, Vietnam.

== History ==
In 1983, the high school was the first high school in Tam Nong District first founded with 4 classes, one class of grade 11 and three classes of grade 10. On July 31, 1984, the People's Committee of Dong Thap City re-named it as Tam Nong High School and initiated a plan to locate the school's campus in an area of over 24.654 sq. meter at Phu Ninh village, Tam Nong District, Dong Thap Province.

== Teaching staff ==
The principal is Ms. Phan Văn Trung, a learned man, majors in chemistry. There are about 70 teachers with seven groups, i.e. Literature, English, History-Geography-Civic Education, Maths-Informatics, Physics-Chemistry-Industrial Engineering, Physical Education-National Defense and Biology-Agricultural Engineering. Most teachers are young, qualified experienced and devoted. File:Teaching Staff.jpg

== Infrastructure ==
Tam Nong High School was located in a large campus (over 2 hectares) in 1984.

== Education ==
Tam Nong High School offers each grade 10th, 11th, and 12th special education to help students perform well with their own talents. Students must wear uniforms when we go to school. The uniforms for boys consist of blue or dark-colored pants and white shirts. The girls wear ao dai. The school functions from 7 a.m. to 5 p.m. During the recess hour students often go to the playground or go to the library to read books or newspapers. At break time, they also play sport, etc.

The tuition fee is at the same level as public schools in Vietnam. Apart from the statutory fee.

== Admission ==
Students who want to be admitted must take a written examination consisting of three tests: Mathematics, Literature, and English. Approximately 500 students achieving the highest scores in the examination will be chosen from the competitive pool of hundreds of candidates each year.
