= An Hòa =

An Hòa may refer to several places in Vietnam, including:

- An Hòa: commune in Đồng Tháp province.
- An Hòa: commune in Gia Lai province.
