= An Long, Đồng Tháp =

An Long
- Commune
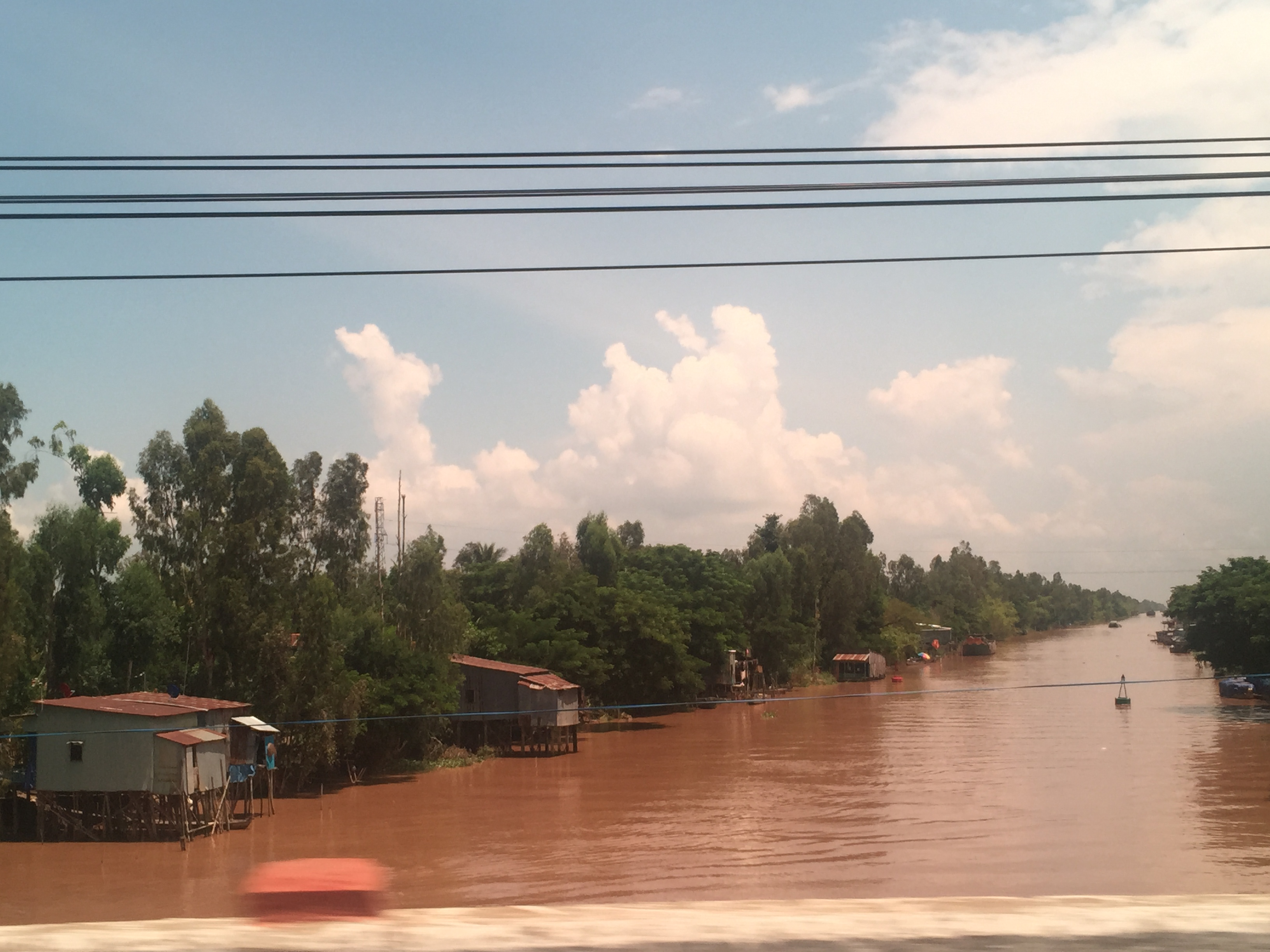
- A rural view
- Country: Vietnam
- Province: Đồng Tháp
- Establish: June 16, 2025

Area
  - Total: 72.19 km^{2} (27.87 sq mi)

Population (2025)
  - Total: 50,050 people
  - Density: 693.3/km^{2} (1,796/sq mi)
- Time zone: UTC+07:00

An Long is a commune in Đồng Tháp province, Vietnam. It is one of 102 communes and wards in the province following the 2025 reorganization.

== Geography ==
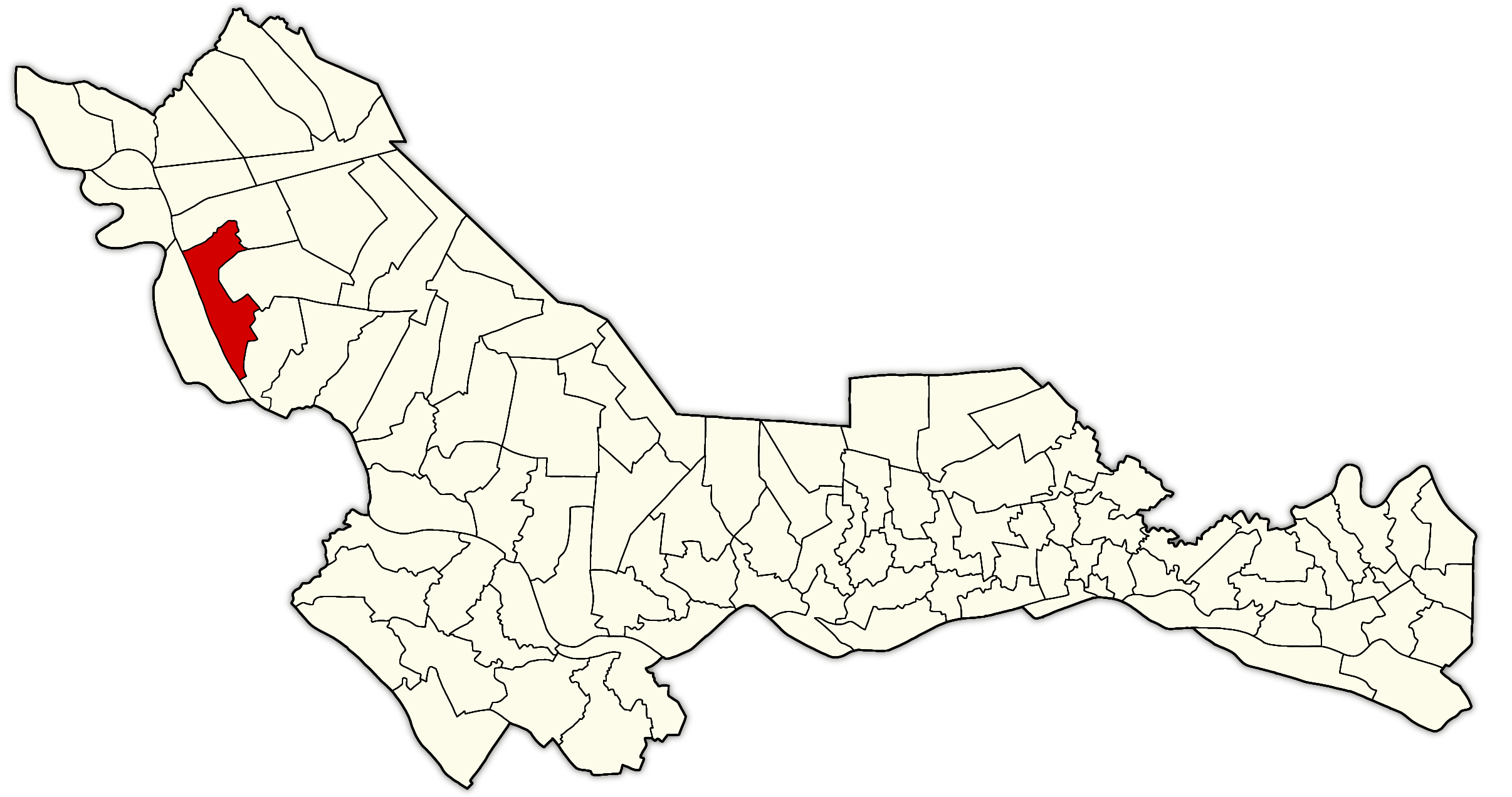
Location of An Long commune on Đồng Tháp province map (highlight in red).

An Long is a riverside commune along the Tiền River, located in the northern part of Đồng Tháp province. The commune has the following geographical location:

- To the west, it borders Tân Long commune.
- To the southeast, it borders Tân Thạnh commune.
- To the east, it borders Phú Thọ commune.
- To the north, it borders An Hòa commune.

== History ==
Before 2025, An Long commune was formerly An Phong commune (belonging to Thanh Bình district), An Long commune and Phú Ninh commune (belonging to Tam Nông), all belonging to Đồng Tháp province.

On June 12, 2025, the National Assembly of Vietnam issued Resolution No. 202/2025/QH15 on the reorganization of provincial-level administrative units. Accordingly:

- Đồng Tháp province was established by merging the entire area and population of Đồng Tháp province and Tiền Giang province.

On June 16, 2025, the Standing Committee of the National Assembly of Vietnam issued Resolution No. 1663/NQ-UBTVQH15 on the reorganization of commune-level administrative units in Đồng Tháp province. Accordingly:

- An Long commune was established by merging the entire area and population of An Phong commune (formerly part of Thanh Bình district), An Long commune, and Phú Ninh commune (formerly part of Tam Nông district).
