= Tân Thạnh, Đồng Tháp =

Tân Thạnh
- Commune
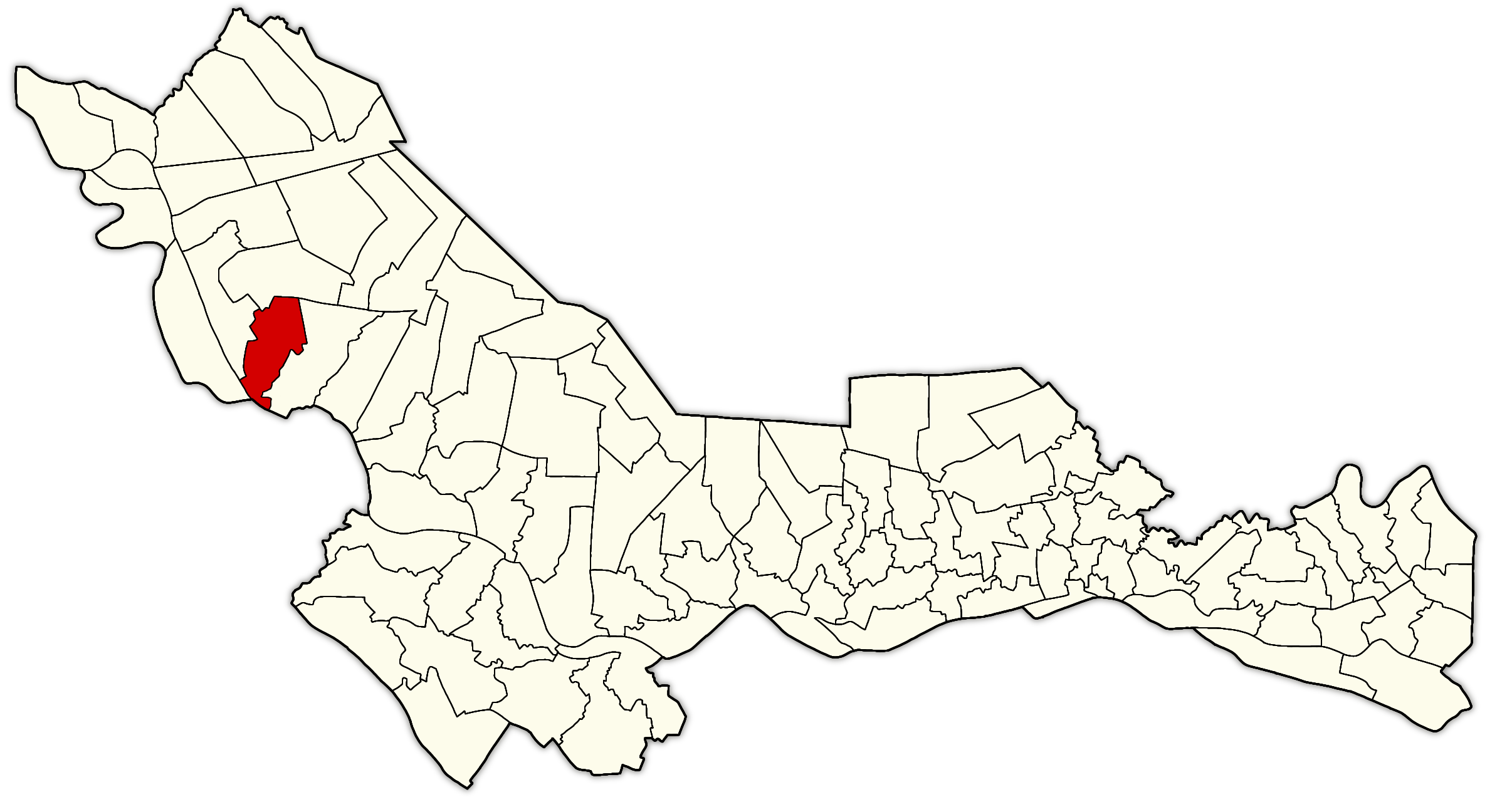
- Location map of Tân Thạnh commune
- Country: Vietnam
- Province: Đồng Tháp
- Establish: June 16, 2025

Area
  - Total: 59.51 km^{2} (22.98 sq mi)

Population (2025)
  - Total: 30,740 people
  - Density: 516.6/km^{2} (1,338/sq mi)
- Time zone: UTC+07:00

Tân Thạnh is a commune in Đồng Tháp province, Vietnam. It is one of 102 communes and wards in the province following the 2025 reorganization.

== Geography ==
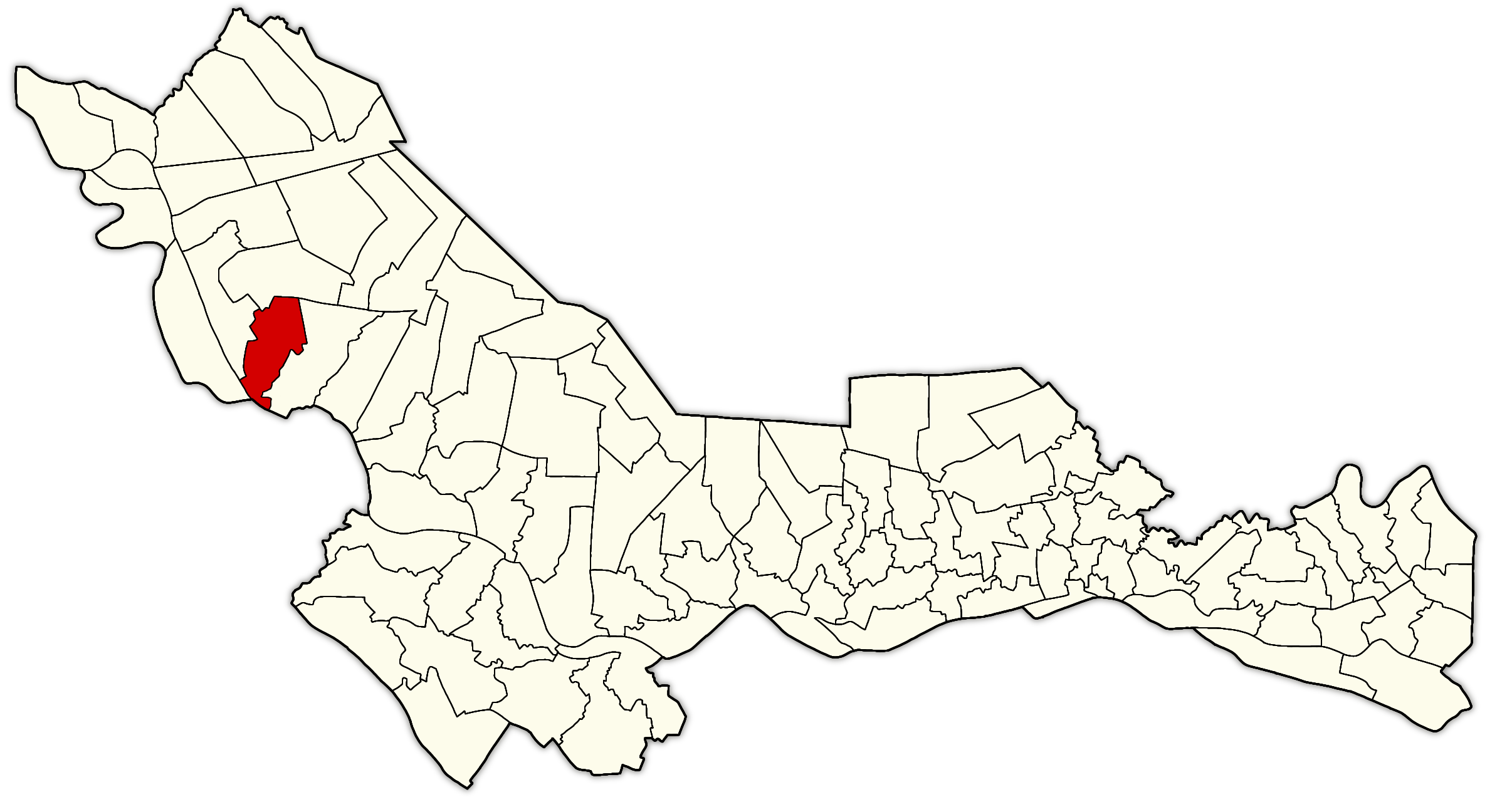
Location of Tân Thạnh commune on Đồng Tháp province map (highlight in red).

Tân Thạnh is a riverside commune along the Tiền River, located in the northern part of Đồng Tháp province. The commune has the following geographical location:

- To the east, it borders Thanh Bình commune.
- To the south, it borders Tân Long commune and An Giang province.
- To the west, it borders An Long commune.
- To the north, it borders Phú Thọ commune.

== History ==
Prior to 2025, Tân Thạnh commune was formerly Phú Lợi commune and part of Tân Thạnh commune, belonging to Thanh Bình district, Đồng Tháp province.

On June 12, 2025, the National Assembly of Vietnam issued Resolution No. 202/2025/QH15 on the reorganization of provincial-level administrative units. Accordingly:

- Đồng Tháp province was established by merging the entire area and population of Đồng Tháp province and Tiền Giang province.

On June 16, 2025, the Standing Committee of the National Assembly of Vietnam issued Resolution No. 1663/NQ-UBTVQH15 on the reorganization of commune-level administrative units in Đồng Tháp province. Accordingly:

- The commune of Tân Thạnh was established by merging the entire area and population of Phú Lợi commune and a part of Tân Thạnh commune (formerly part of Thanh Bình district).
