= Phú Thọ, Đồng Tháp =

Phú Thọ
- Commune
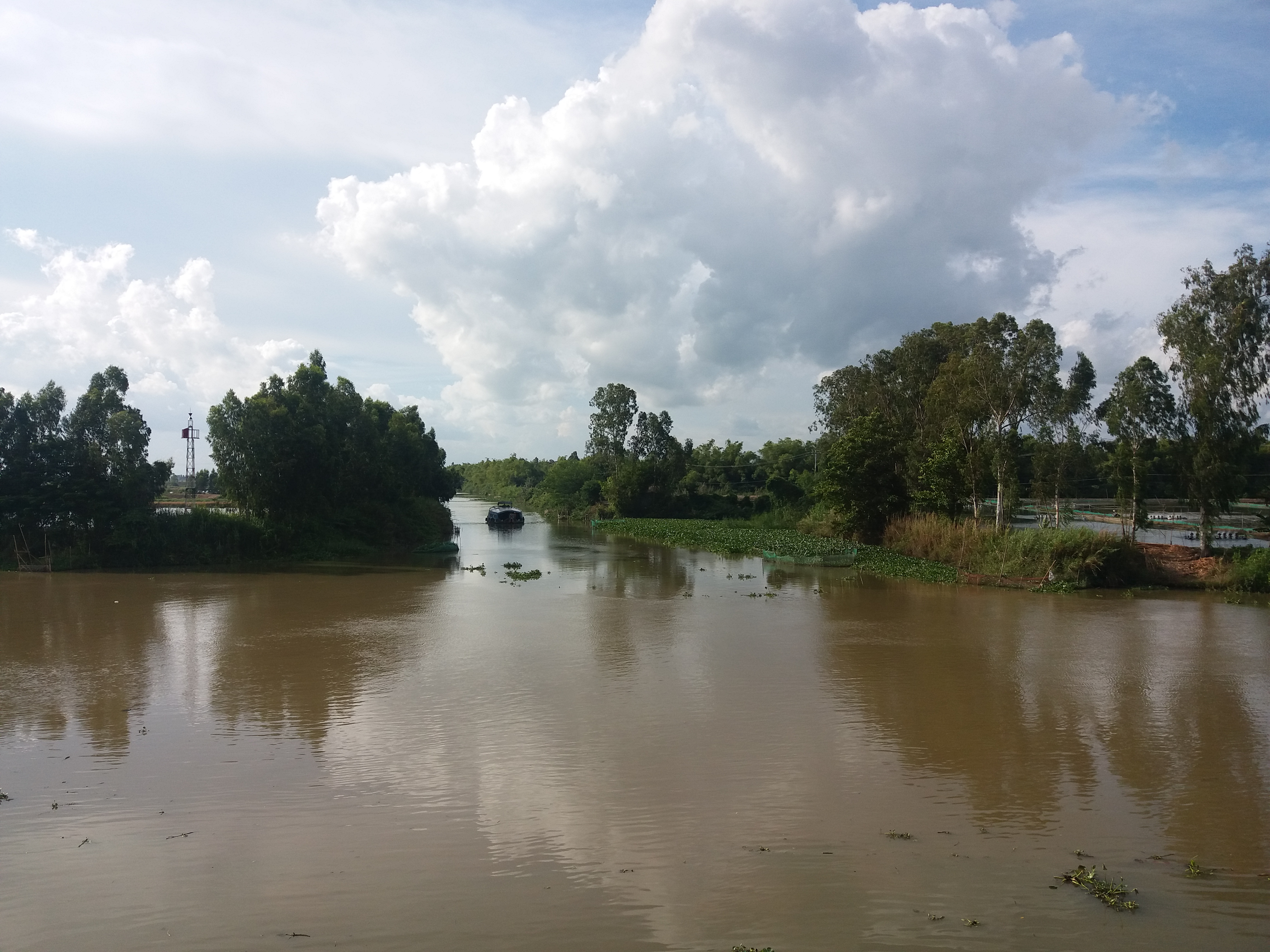
- A rural view
- Country: Vietnam
- Province: Đồng Tháp
- Establish: June 16, 2025

Area
  - Total: 84.90 km^{2} (32.78 sq mi)

Population (2025)
  - Total: 30,372 people
  - Density: 357.7/km^{2} (926.5/sq mi)
- Time zone: UTC+07:00

Phú Thọ is a commune in Đồng Tháp province, Vietnam. It is one of 102 communes and wards in the province following the 2025 reorganization.

== Geography ==
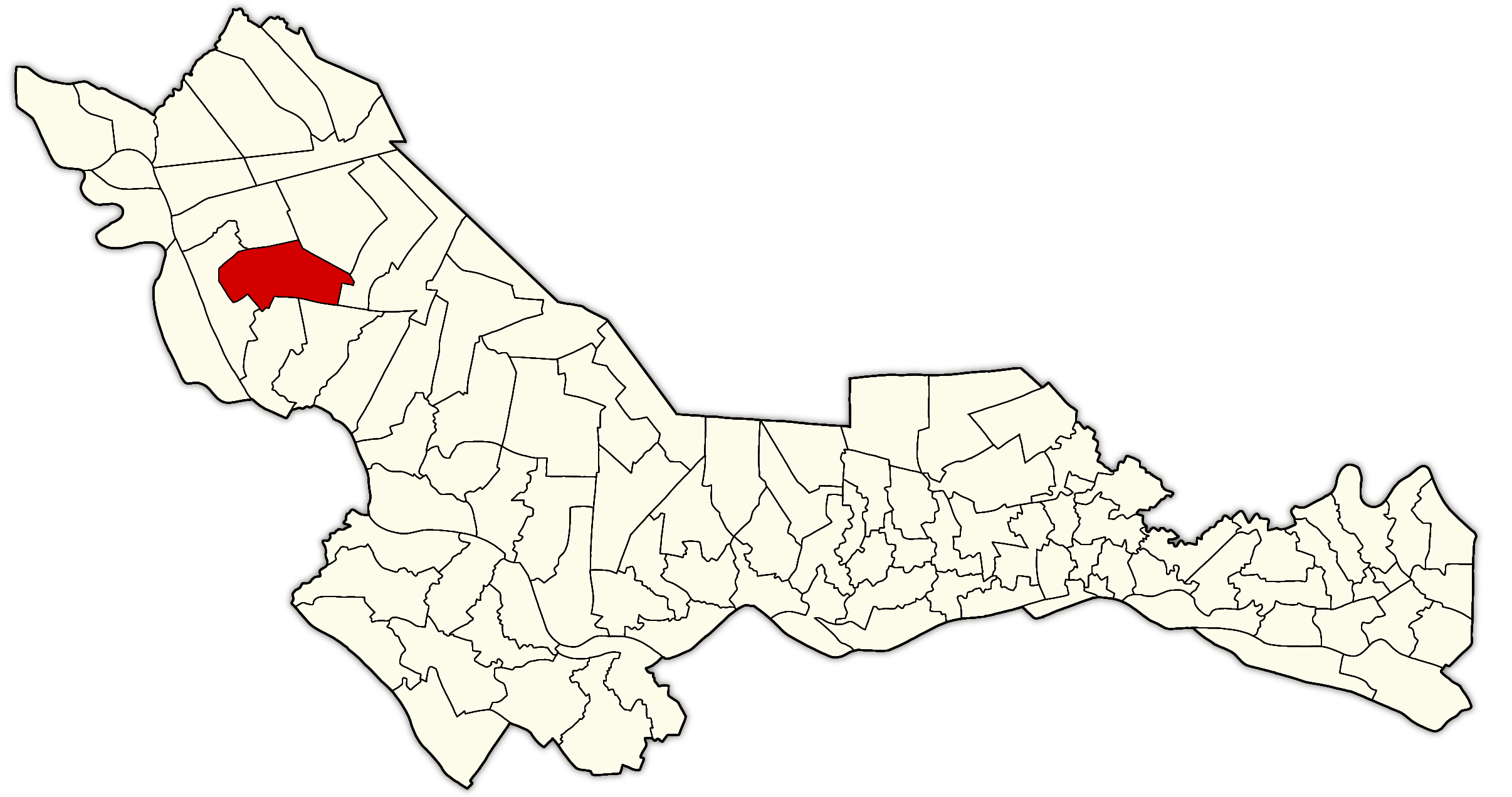
Location of Phú Thọ commune on Đồng Tháp province map (highlight in red).

Phú Thọ commune has the following geographical location:

- To the west, it borders An Long commune.
- To the north, it borders An Hòa commune.
- To the northeast, it borders Tam Nông commune.
- To the east, it borders Tràm Chim ward.
- To the south, it borders Tân Thạnh commune and Thanh Bình commune.

== History ==
Prior to 2025, Phú Thọ commune consisted of Phú Thành A and Phú Thọ communes in Tam Nông district, Đồng Tháp province.

On June 12, 2025, the National Assembly of Vietnam issued Resolution No. 202/2025/QH15 on the reorganization of provincial-level administrative units. Accordingly:

- Đồng Tháp province was established by merging the entire area and population of Đồng Tháp province and Tiền Giang province.

On June 16, 2025, the Standing Committee of the National Assembly of Vietnam issued Resolution No. 1663/NQ-UBTVQH15 on the reorganization of commune-level administrative units in Đồng Tháp province. Accordingly:

- Phú Thọ commune was established by merging the entire area and population of Phú Thành A commune and Phú Thọ commune (formerly part of Tam Nông district).
