= Tam Nông, Đồng Tháp =

Tam Nông
- Commune
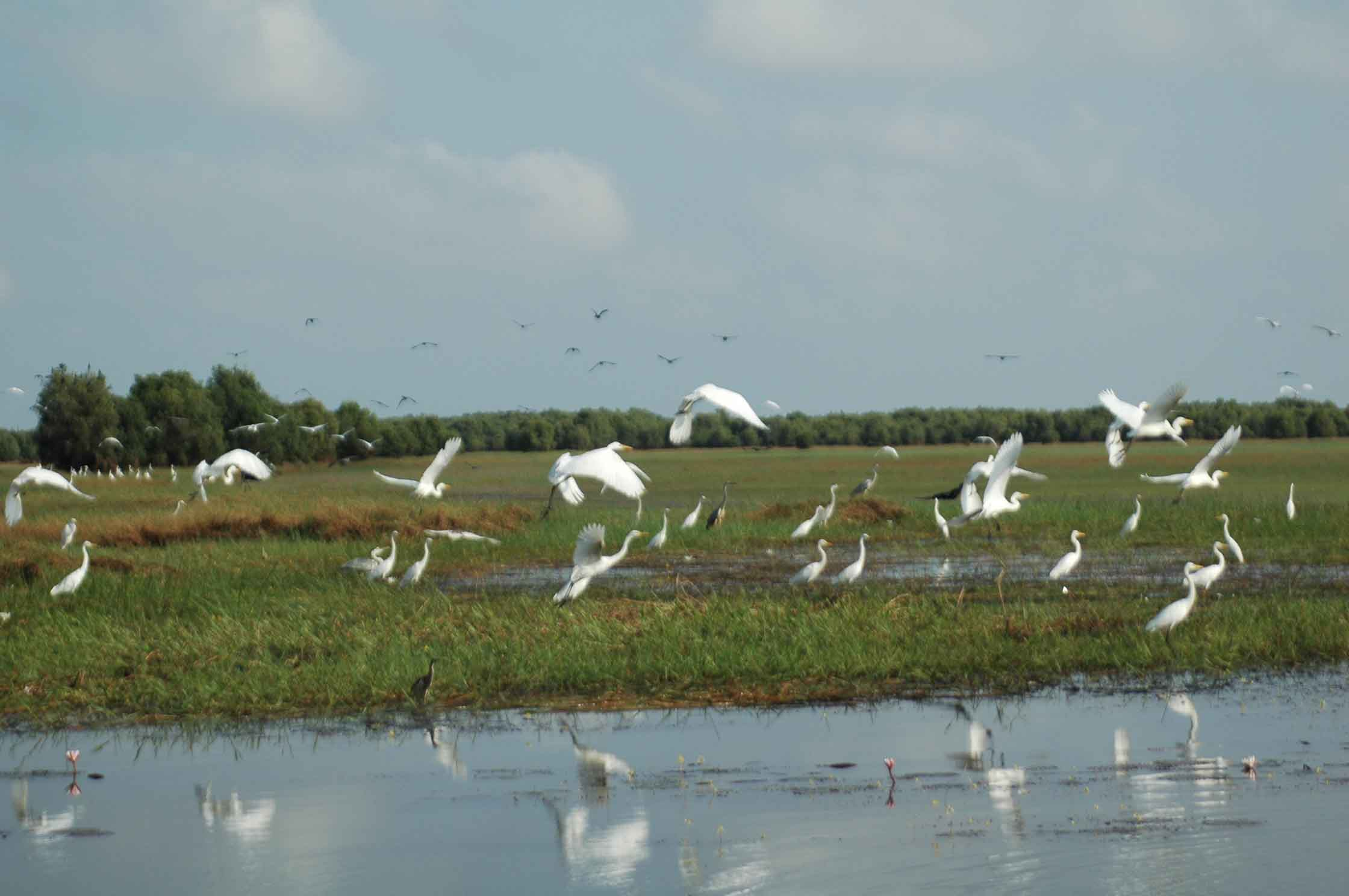
- Tràm Chim National Park
- Country: Vietnam
- Province: Đồng Tháp
- Establish: June 16, 2025

Area
  - Total: 39.64 sq mi (102.67 km^{2})

Population (2025)
  - Total: 21,031 people
  - Density: 530.54/sq mi (204.84/km^{2})
- Time zone: UTC+07:00
- Website: http://tamnong.dongthap.gov.vn/

Tam Nông is a commune in Đồng Tháp province, Vietnam. It is one of 102 communes and wards in the province following the 2025 reorganization.

== Geography ==
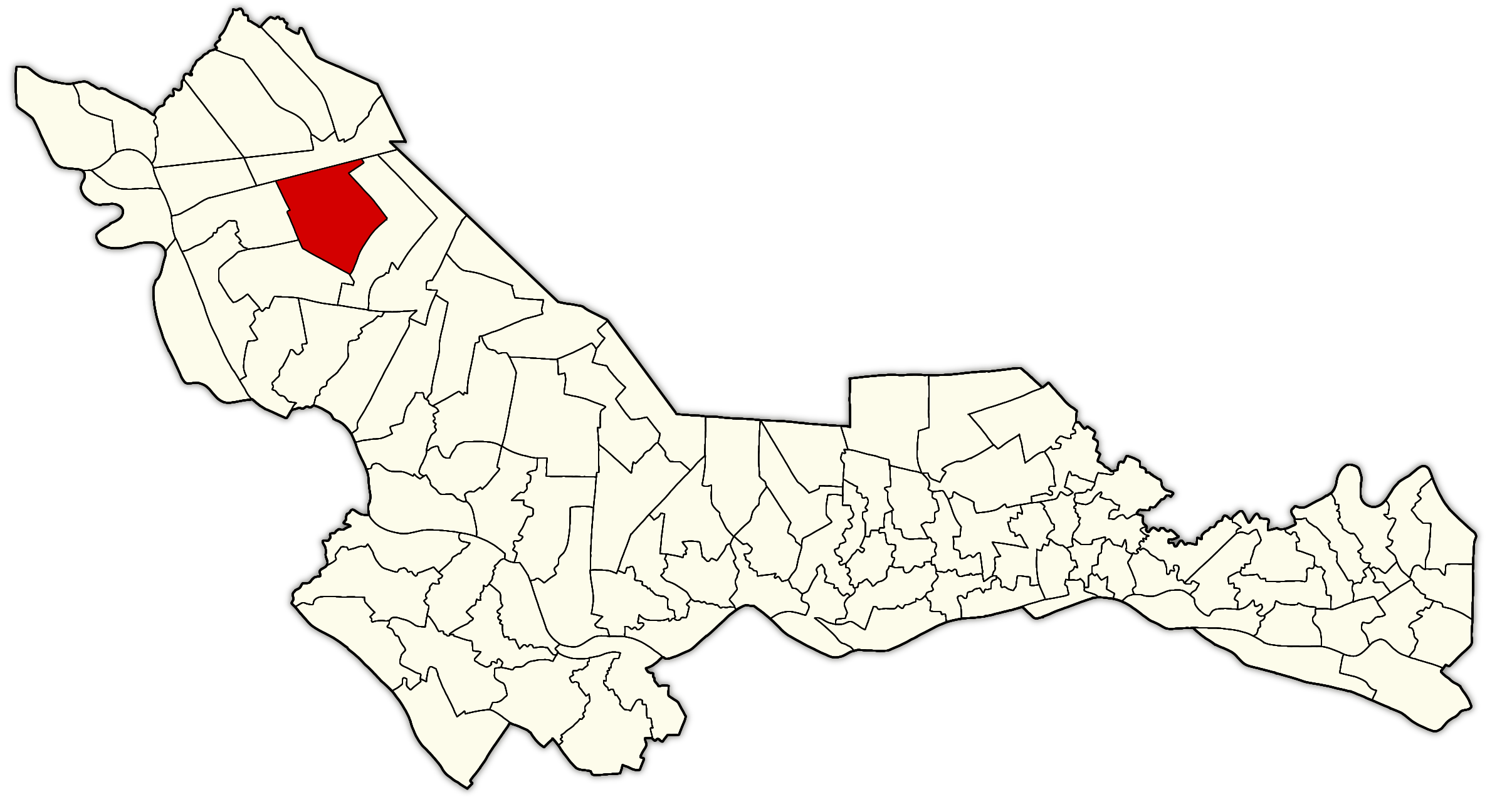
Location of Tam Nông commune on Đồng Tháp province map (highlight in red).

Tam Nông commune has the following geographical location:

- To the north, it borders An Phước commune.
- To the west, it borders An Hòa commune.
- To the southwest, it borders Phú Thọ commune.
- To the east and southeast, it borders Tràm Chim ward.

== History ==
Prior to 2025, Tam Nông commune was formerly Phú Hiệp and Phú Đức communes in Tam Nông district, Đồng Tháp province.

On June 16, 2025, the Standing Committee of the National Assembly of Vietnam issued Resolution No. 1663/NQ-UBTVQH15 on the reorganization of commune-level administrative units in Đồng Tháp province. Accordingly:

- Tam Nông commune was established by merging the entire area and population of Phú Hiệp and Phú Đức communes (formerly part of Tam Nông district).
