= Tràm Chim =

Commune in Đồng Tháp province, Vietnam

- Commune
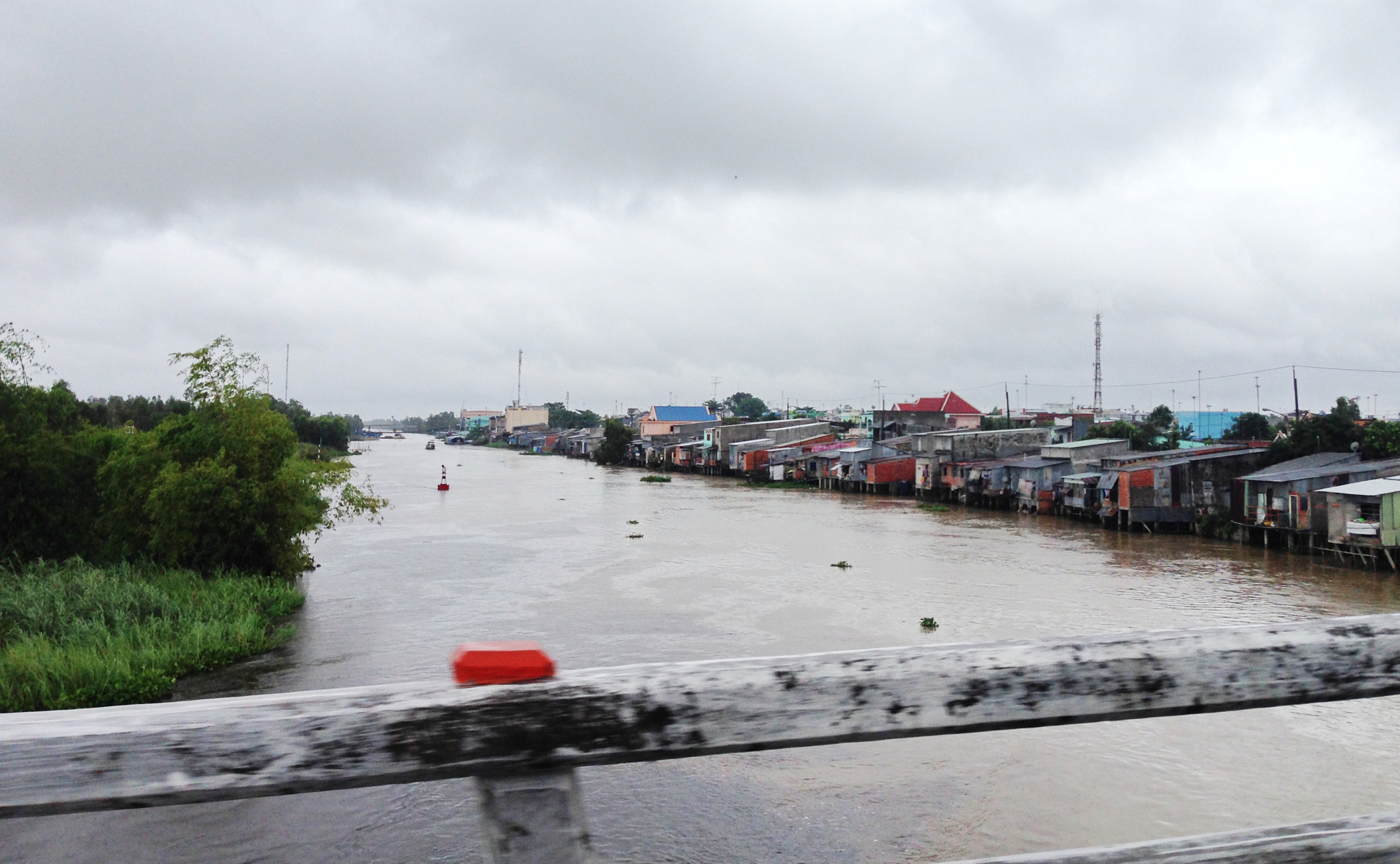
- Tràm Chim bridge in the commune.

- Location within Vietnam
- Coordinates: 10°40′15″N 105°33′38″E
- Country: Vietnam
- Province: Đồng Tháp
- Establish: June 16, 2025

Government
  - Type: Commune

Area
  - Total: 34.84 sq mi (90.23 km^{2})

Population (2025)
  - Total: 22,725 people
  - Density: 652.3/sq mi (251.9/km^{2})
- Time zone: UTC+07:00

Tràm Chim is a commune in Đồng Tháp province, Vietnam. It is one of 102 communes and wards in the province.

Tháp Mười may become a ward of Đồng Tháp province in the future, according to the plan to establish 11 new wards in Đồng Tháp province.

== Geography ==
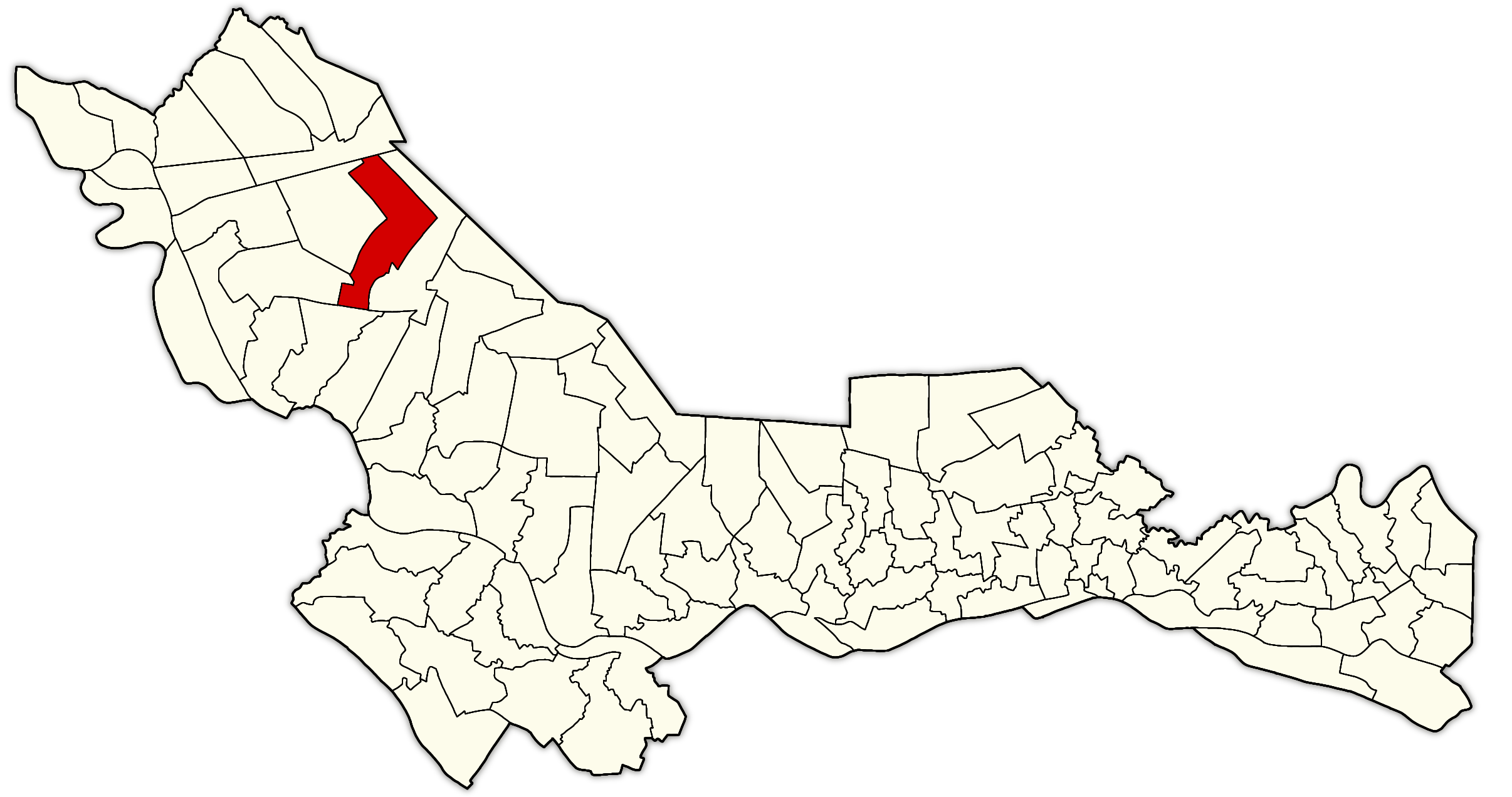
Location of Tràm Chim ward on Đồng Tháp province map (highlight in red).

Tràm Chim ward has the following geographical location:

- To the east, it borders Phú Cường commune.
- To the south, it borders Thanh Bình commune.
- To the southwest, it borders Phú Thọ commune.
- To the northwest it borders Tam Nông commune.
- To the north, it borders An Phước commune.

== History ==
Prior to 2025, Tràm Chim ward was formerly Tràm Chim commune-level town and Tân Công Sính commune in Tam Nông district, Đồng Tháp province.

On June 12, 2025, the National Assembly of Vietnam issued Resolution No. 202/2025/QH15 on the reorganization of provincial-level administrative units. Accordingly:

- Đồng Tháp province was established by merging the entire area and population of Đồng Tháp province and Tiền Giang province.

On June 16, 2025, the Standing Committee of the National Assembly of Vietnam issued Resolution No. 1663/NQ-UBTVQH15 on the reorganization of commune-level administrative units in Đồng Tháp province. Accordingly:

- Tràm Chim commune was established by merging the entire area and population of Tràm Chim commune-level town and Tân Công Sính commune (formerly part of Tam Nông district).

On May 11, 2026, the People's Council of Đồng Tháp province approved the plan to establish 11 new wards in the province. Accordingly:

- The Tràm Chim ward was established based on the entire area and population of Tràm Chim commune.
