= An Hòa, Đồng Tháp =

An Hòa
- Commune
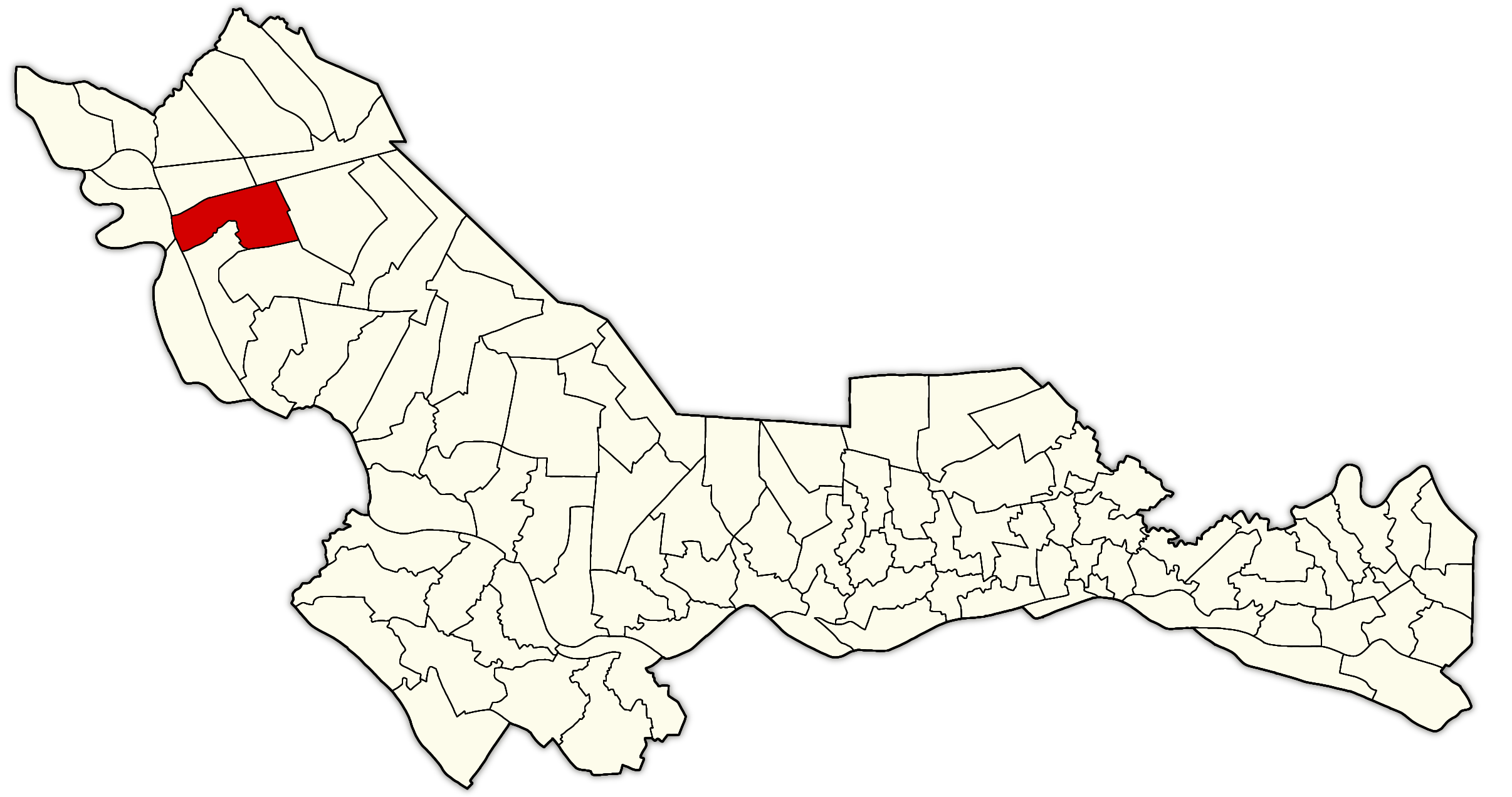
- Location of An Hòa commune on Đồng Tháp province map (highlight in red)
- Country: Vietnam
- Province: Đồng Tháp
- Establish: June 16, 2025

Area
  - Total: 77.89 km^{2} (30.07 sq mi)

Population (2025)
  - Total: 19,033 people
  - Density: 244.4/km^{2} (632.9/sq mi)
- Time zone: UTC+07:00

An Hòa is a commune in Đồng Tháp province, Vietnam. It is one of 102 communes and wards in the province following the 2025 reorganization.

== Geography ==
An Hòa commune has the following geographical location:

- To the east, it borders Tam Nông commune.
- To the north, it borders An Bình ward and An Phước commune.
- To the west, it borders Long Phú Thuận commune and Tân Long commune.
- To the south, it borders An Long commune and Phú Thọ commune.

== History ==
Prior to 2025, An Hòa commune was formerly Phú Thành B commune and An Hòa commune in Tam Nông district, Đồng Tháp province.

On June 12, 2025, the National Assembly of Vietnam issued Resolution No. 202/2025/QH15 on the reorganization of provincial-level administrative units. Accordingly:

- Đồng Tháp province was established by merging the entire area and population of Đồng Tháp province and Tiền Giang province.

On June 16, 2025, the Standing Committee of the National Assembly of Vietnam issued Resolution No. 1663/NQ-UBTVQH15 on the reorganization of commune-level administrative units in Đồng Tháp province. Accordingly:

- An Hòa commune was established by merging the entire area and population of Phú Thành B commune and An Hòa commune (formerly part of Tam Nông district).
