= Thanh Bình, Đồng Tháp =

Thanh Bình
- Commune
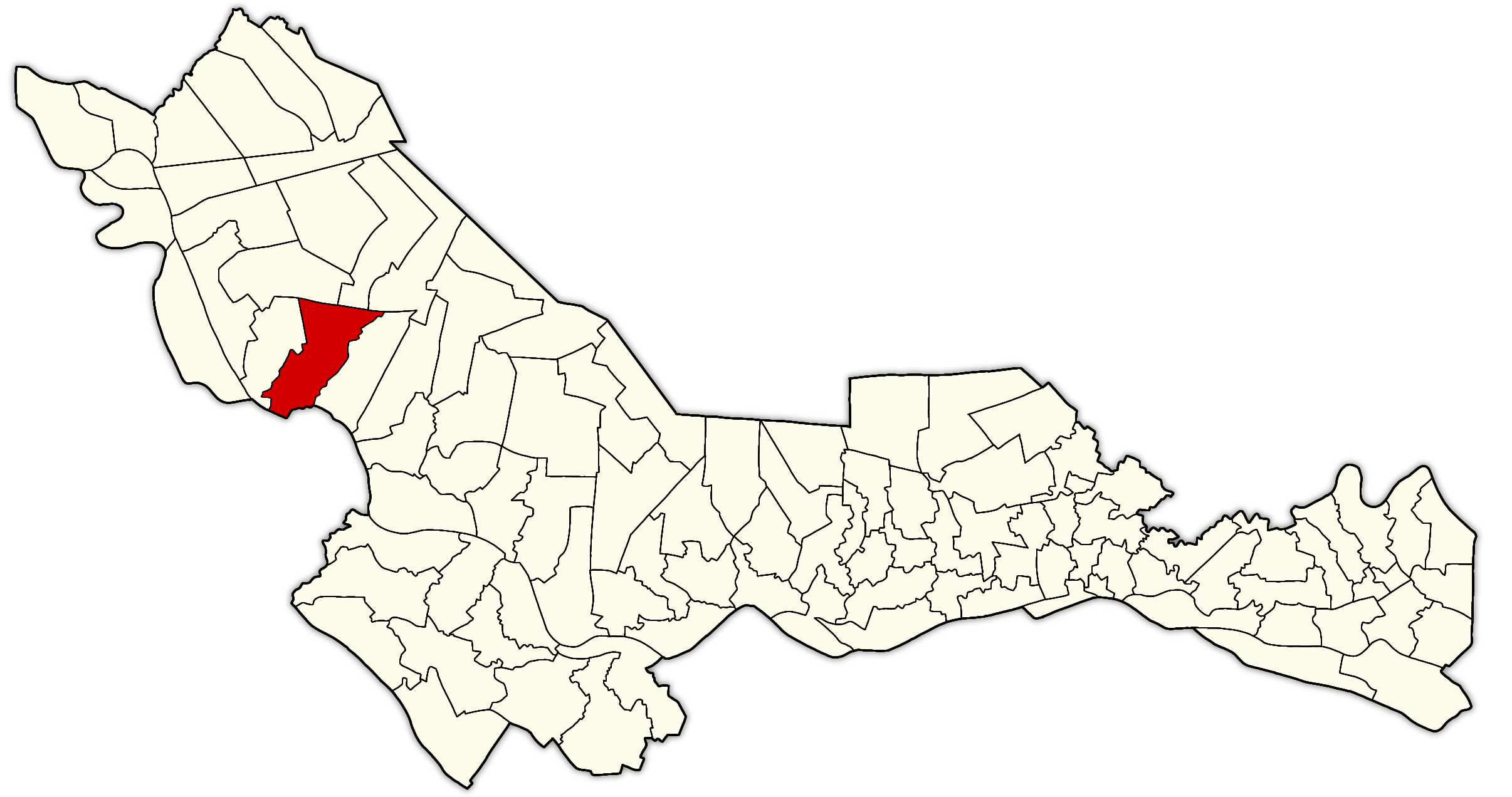
- Location of Thanh Bình commune on Đồng Tháp province map (highlight in red).

- Location within Vietnam
- Coordinates: 10°33′32″N 105°29′16″E
- Country: Vietnam
- Province: Đồng Tháp
- Establish: June 16, 2025

Area
  - Total: 33.20 sq mi (85.99 km^{2})

Population (2025)
  - Total: 47,410 people
- Time zone: UTC+07:00

Thanh Bình is a commune in Đồng Tháp province, Vietnam. It is one of 102 communes and wards in the province.

== Geography ==
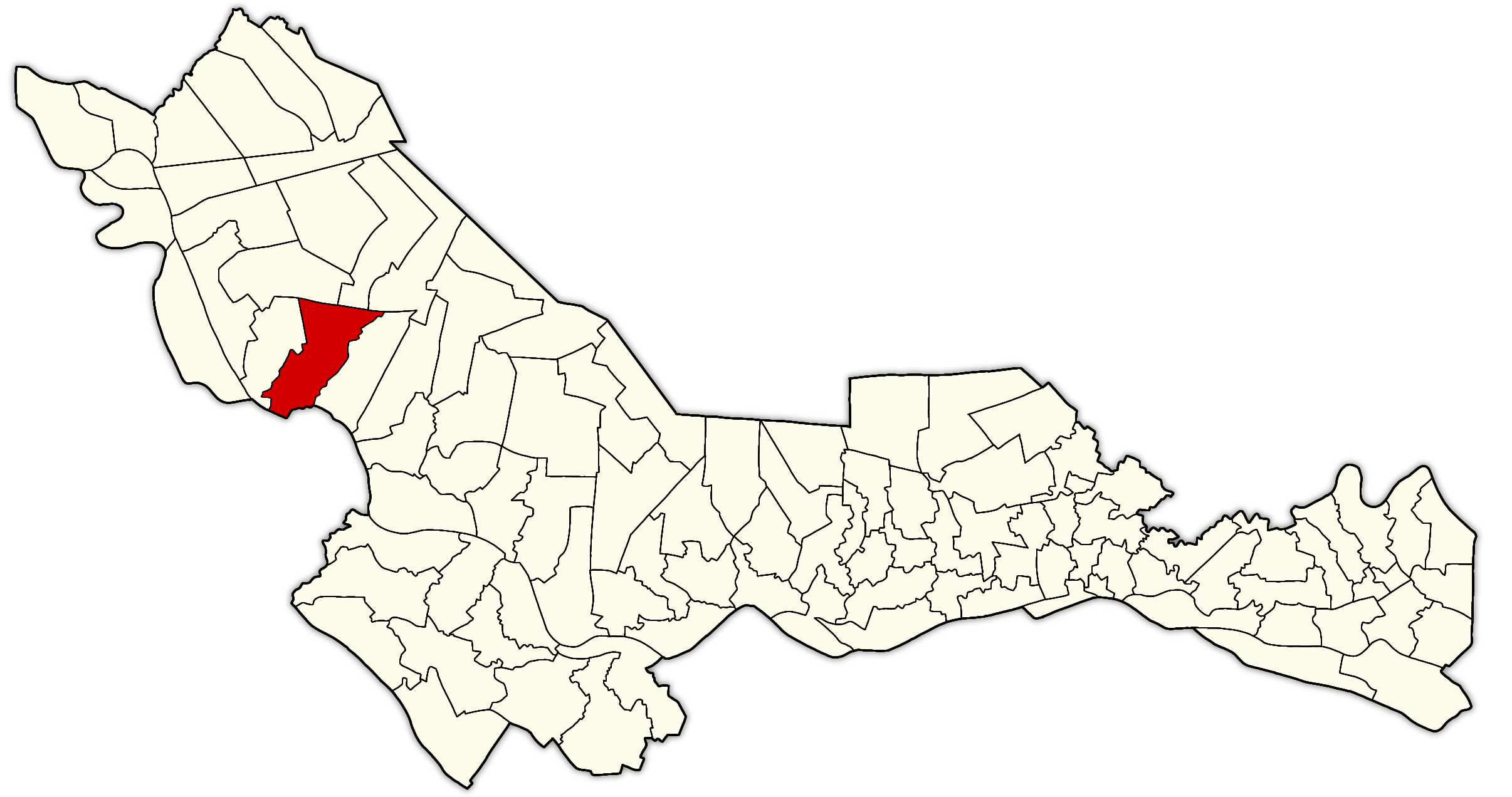
Location of Thanh Bình on Đồng Tháp province map (highlight in red).

Thanh Bình commune has the following geographical location:

- To the east, it borders Bình Thành commune.
- To the north, it borders Phú Thọ commune, Phú Cường commune, and Tràm Chim ward.
- To the west, it borders Tân Thạnh commune.
- To the south, it borders An Giang province.

== History ==
Prior to 2025, Thanh Bình commune was formerly Thanh Bình commune-level town, Tân Mỹ commune, Tân Phú commune, and a part of Tân Thạnh commune of Thanh Bình district, Đồng Tháp province.

On June 12, 2025, Tiền Giang province and Đồng Tháp province was merged into Đồng Tháp province.

On June 16, 2025, the Standing Committee of the National Assembly of Vietnam issued Resolution No. 1663/NQ-UBTVQH15 on the reorganization of commune-level administrative units in Đồng Tháp province. Accordingly:

- Thanh Bình commune was established from former Thanh Bình commune-level town, Tân Mỹ commune, Tân Phú commune, and a part of Tân Thạnh commune (formerly part of the Thanh Bình district).
