= Tân Long, Đồng Tháp =

Commune in Đồng Tháp province, Vietnam

Tân Long
- Commune
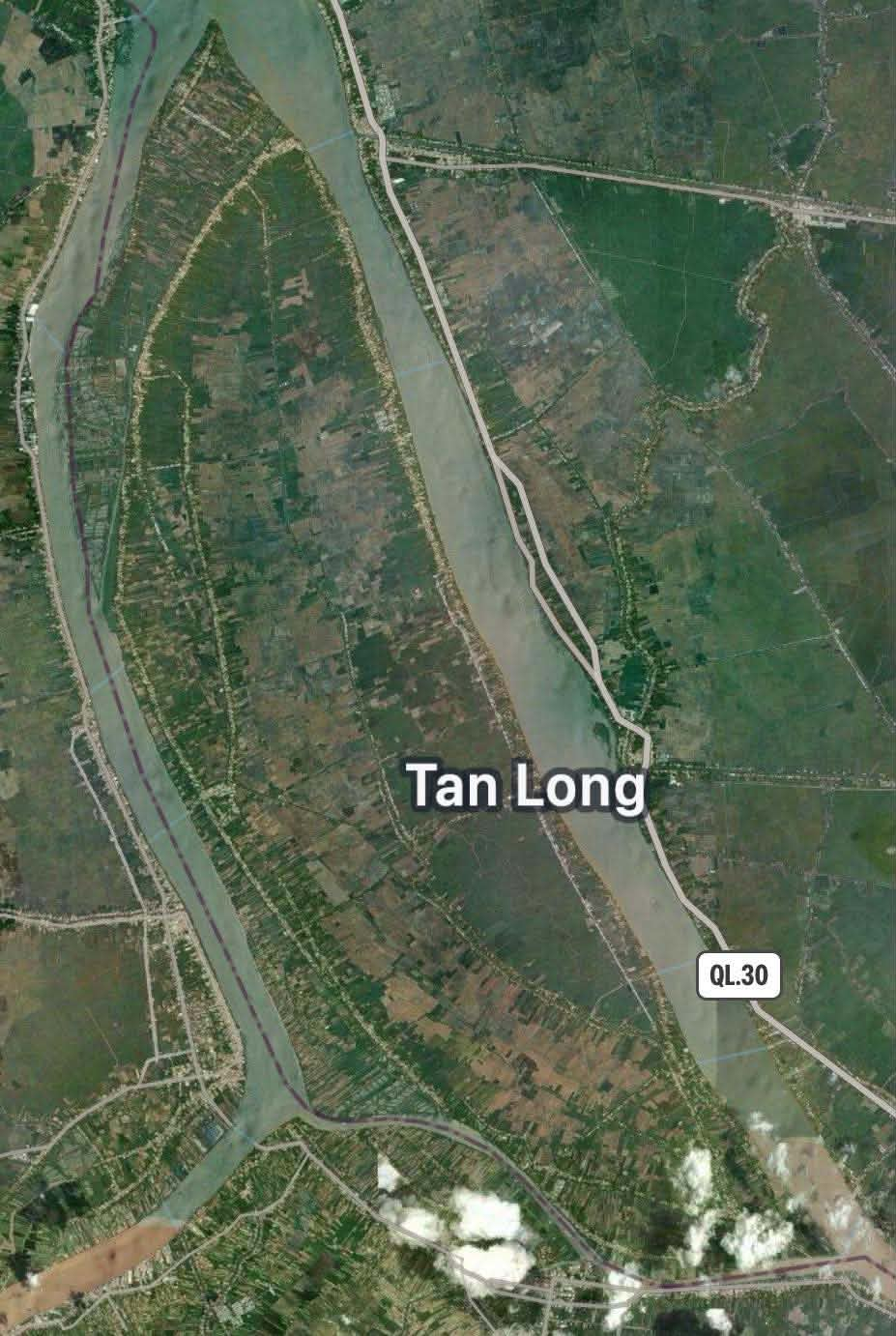
- Tây (West) Island as seen from space.
- Country: Vietnam
- Province: Đồng Tháp
- Establish: 16 June 2025

Area
  - Total: 94.86 km^{2} (36.63 sq mi)

Population (2025)
  - Total: 76,717 people
  - Density: 808.7/km^{2} (2,095/sq mi)
- Time zone: UTC+07:00 (Indochina Time)

Tân Long is an island commune in Đồng Tháp province, Vietnam. It is one of 102 communes and wards in the province following the 2025 reorganization.

Tân Long is one of five island communes in Đồng Tháp province, along with Long Khánh, Long Phú Thuận, Tân Thới and Tân Phú Đông.

== Geography ==
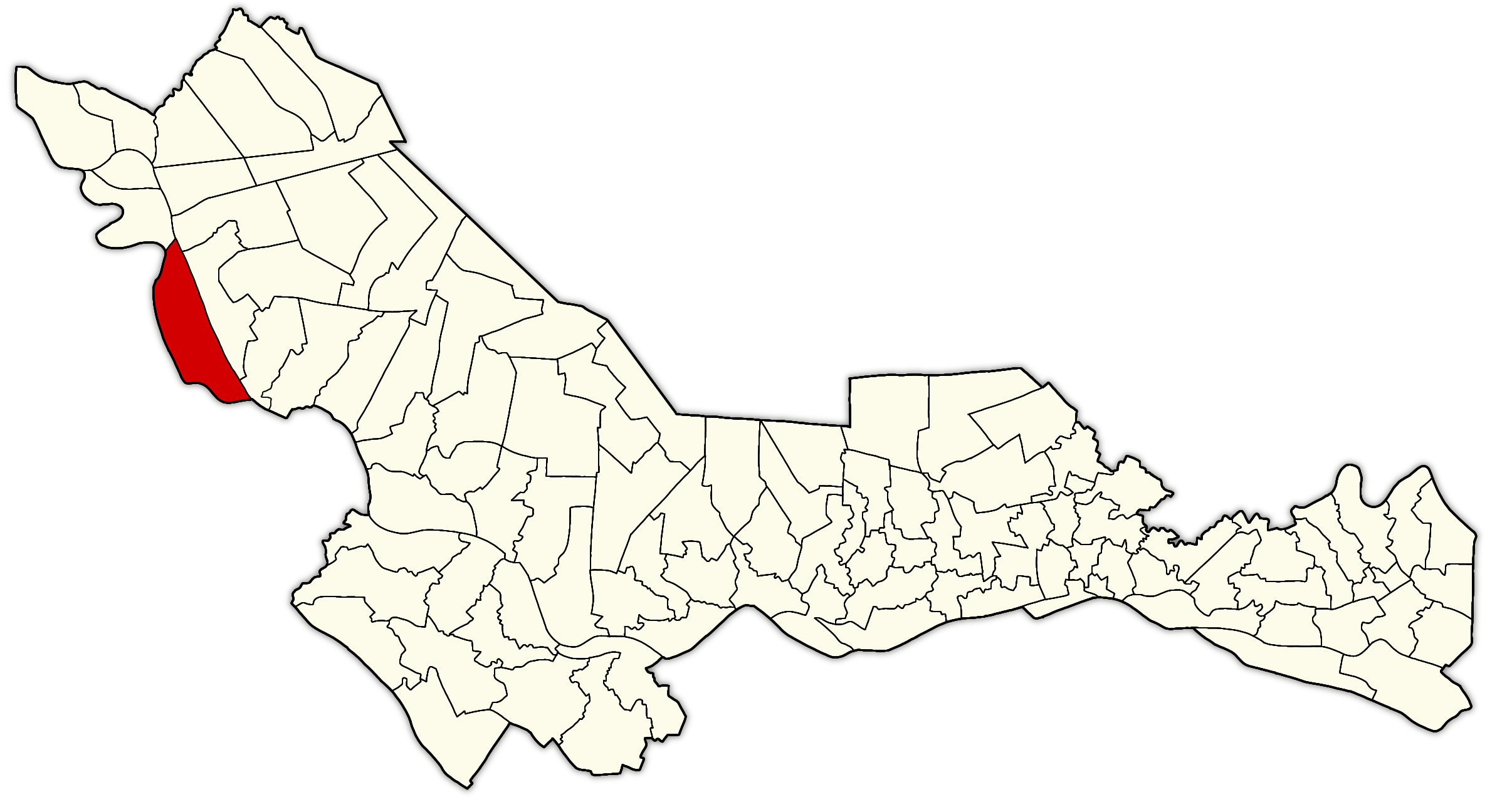
Location of Tân Long commune on Đồng Tháp province map (highlight in red).

Tân Long is an island commune on the Tiền river, located in the northern part of Đồng Tháp province. The commune has the following geographical location:

- To the west and south, it borders An Giang province.
- To the north, it borders Long Phú Thuận commune and An Hòa commune.
- To the east, it borders An Long commune and Tân Thạnh commune.

== History ==
Prior to 2025, Tân Long commune comprised the communes of Tân Bình, Tân Hòa, Tân Quới, Tân Huề, Tân Long (belonging to Thanh Bình district) and a part of Phú Thuận B commune (belonging to Hồng Ngự district), all belonging to Đồng Tháp province.

On 12 June 2025, the National Assembly of Vietnam issued Resolution No. 202/2025/QH15 on the reorganization of provincial-level administrative units. Accordingly:

- Đồng Tháp province was established by merging the entire area and population of Đồng Tháp province and Tiền Giang province.

On 16 June 2025, the Standing Committee of the National Assembly of Vietnam issued Resolution No. 1663/NQ-UBTVQH15 on the reorganization of commune-level administrative units in Đồng Tháp province. Accordingly:

- Tân Long commune was established by merging the entire area and population of Tân Bình, Tân Hòa, Tân Quới, Tân Huề, Tân Long communes (formerly belonging to Thanh Bình district) and a part of Phú Thuận B commune (formerly part of Hồng Ngự district).
