= Thanh Bình district =

Coordinates: 10.583°N 105.467°E

Thanh Bình district Huyện Thanh Bình
- District
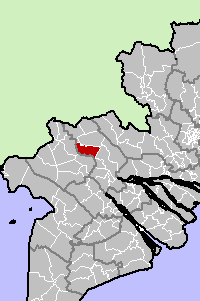
- Location in Đồng Tháp Province
- Country: Vietnam
- Region: Mekong Delta
- Province: Đồng Tháp
- Capital: Thanh Bình (township)

Area
  - Total: 127 sq mi (329 km^{2})

Population (2019)
  - Total: 202,130
- Time zone: UTC+7 (Indochina Time)

Thanh Bình was a rural district of Đồng Tháp province in the Mekong Delta region of Vietnam. As of 2003, the district had a population of 158,203, rising to 162,130 in 2004. The district covers an area of 329 km^{2} (127 sq mi). The district capital lies at Thanh Bình.

On June 16, 2025, the Standing Committee of the National Assembly issued Resolution No. 1685/NQ-UBTVQH15. The district was dissolved and new wards were rearranged from the district.

== Divisions ==
The district is divided into one urban ward and 11 communes:

Thanh Bình (ward), Bình Thành, Tân Mỹ, Phú Lợi, Tân Phú, Tân Thạnh, An Phong, Tân Long, Tân Quới, Tân Hoà, Tân Huề and Tân Bình.
