= Tam Nông district, Đồng Tháp =

Tam Nông district
- District
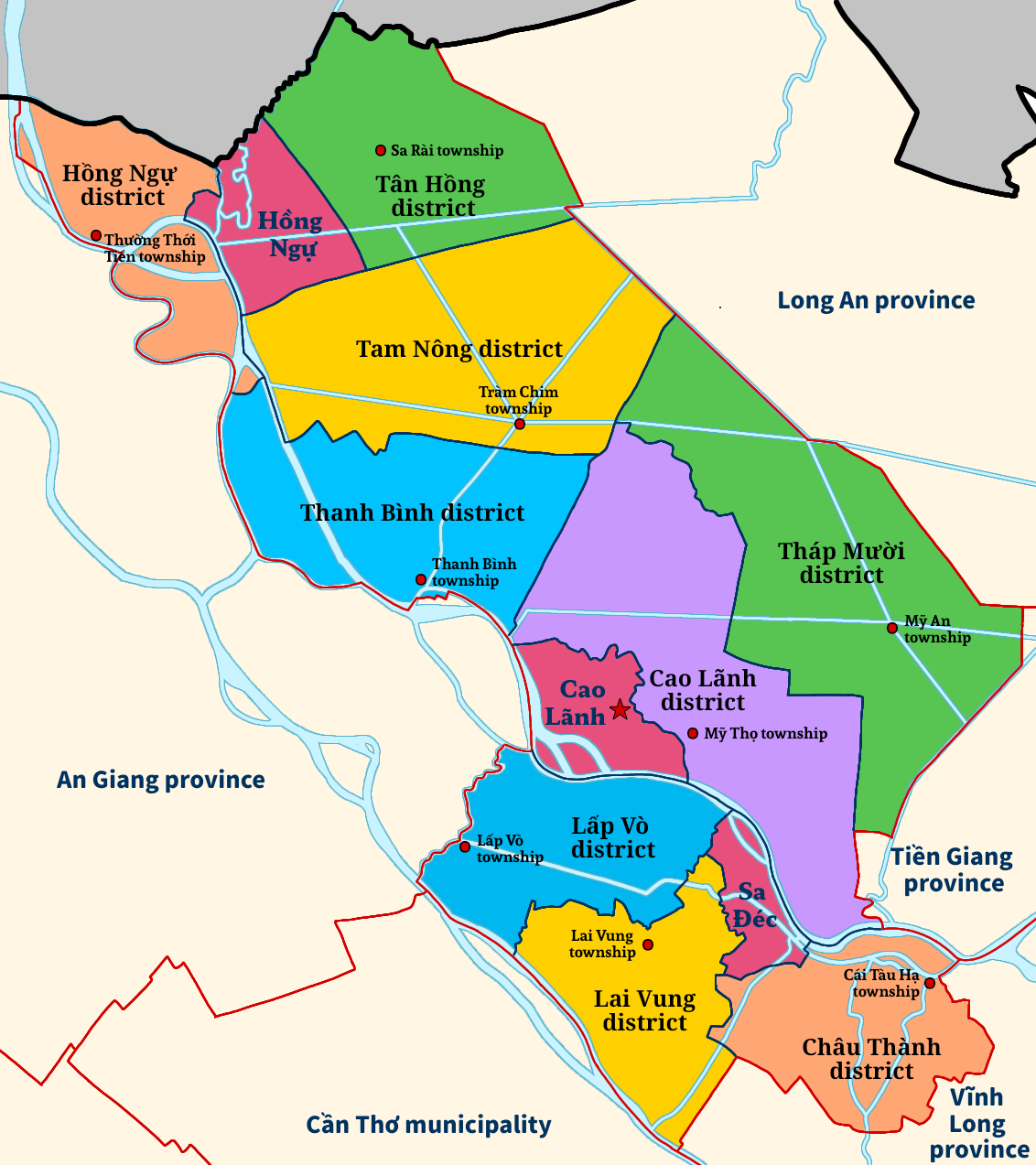
- Location of Tam Nông district on Đồng Tháp province map.
- Interactive map of Tam Nông district
- Country: Vietnam
- Region: Mekong Delta
- Province: Đồng Tháp
- Capital: Tràm Chim

Area
  - Total: 177 sq mi (459 km^{2})

Population (2019)
  - Total: 219,926
- Time zone: UTC+7 (Indochina Time)

Tam Nông is a former rural district (huyện) of Đồng Tháp province in the Mekong Delta region of Vietnam. As of 2003 the district had a population of 96,641. The district covers an area of 459 km^{2} (177 sq mi). The district capital lies at Tràm Chim.

There is a bird sanctuary – Tràm Chim National Park – where red-headed crane (scientific name: Grus antigone sharpei) migrates to every spring. The most ideal living environment for this bird is the spikesedge field which is its diet.

== Divisions ==
The district is divided into one urban ward and communes:

- Tràm Chim
1. An Hòa
2. An Long
3. Phú Ninh
4. Phú Thành A
5. Phú Thành B
6. Phú Thọ
7. Phú Hiệp
8. Phú Đức
9. Phú Cường
10. Tân Công Sính
11. Hòa Bình
