= Đồng Tháp province =

Province of Vietnam

Đồng Tháp
- Province
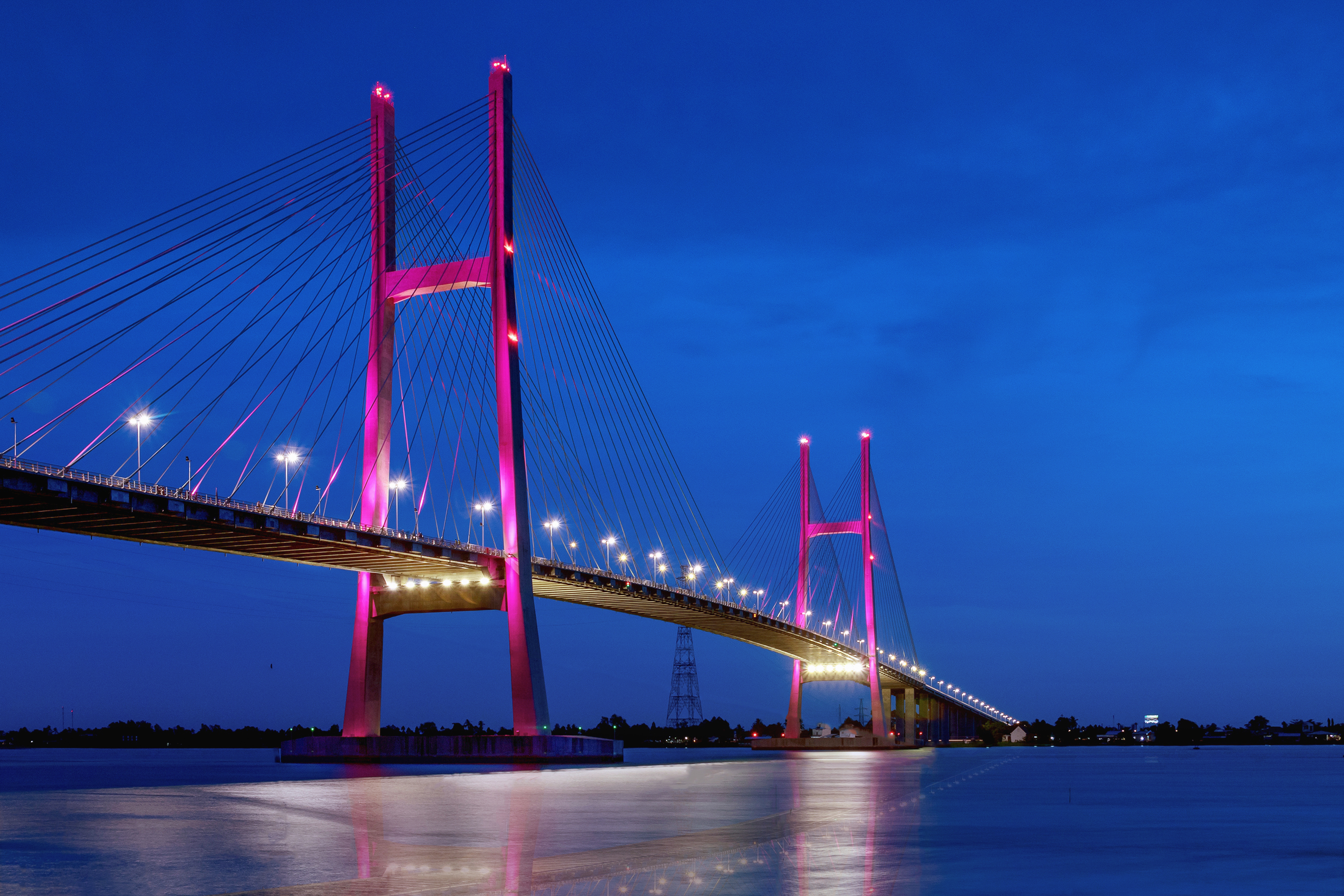
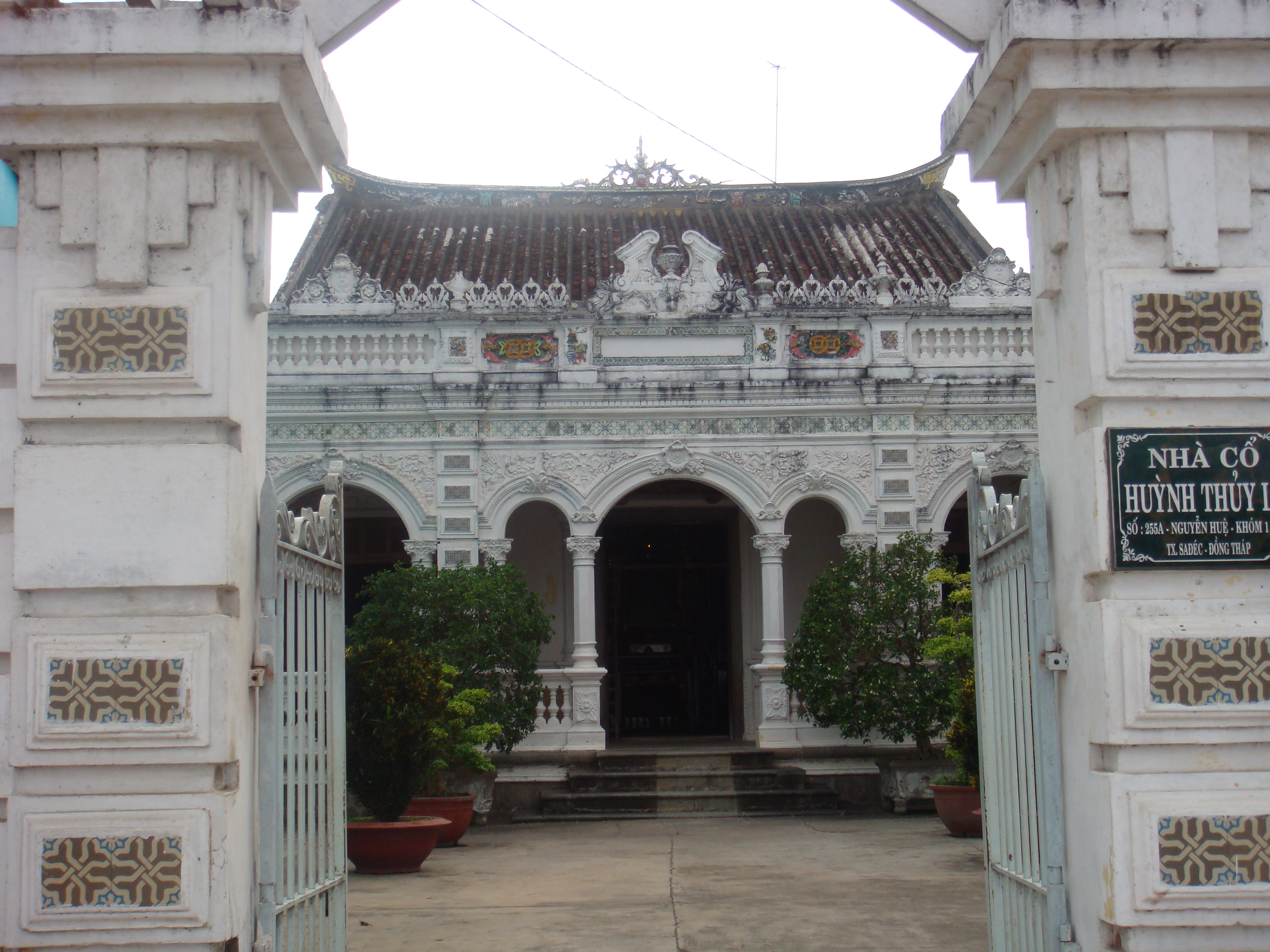
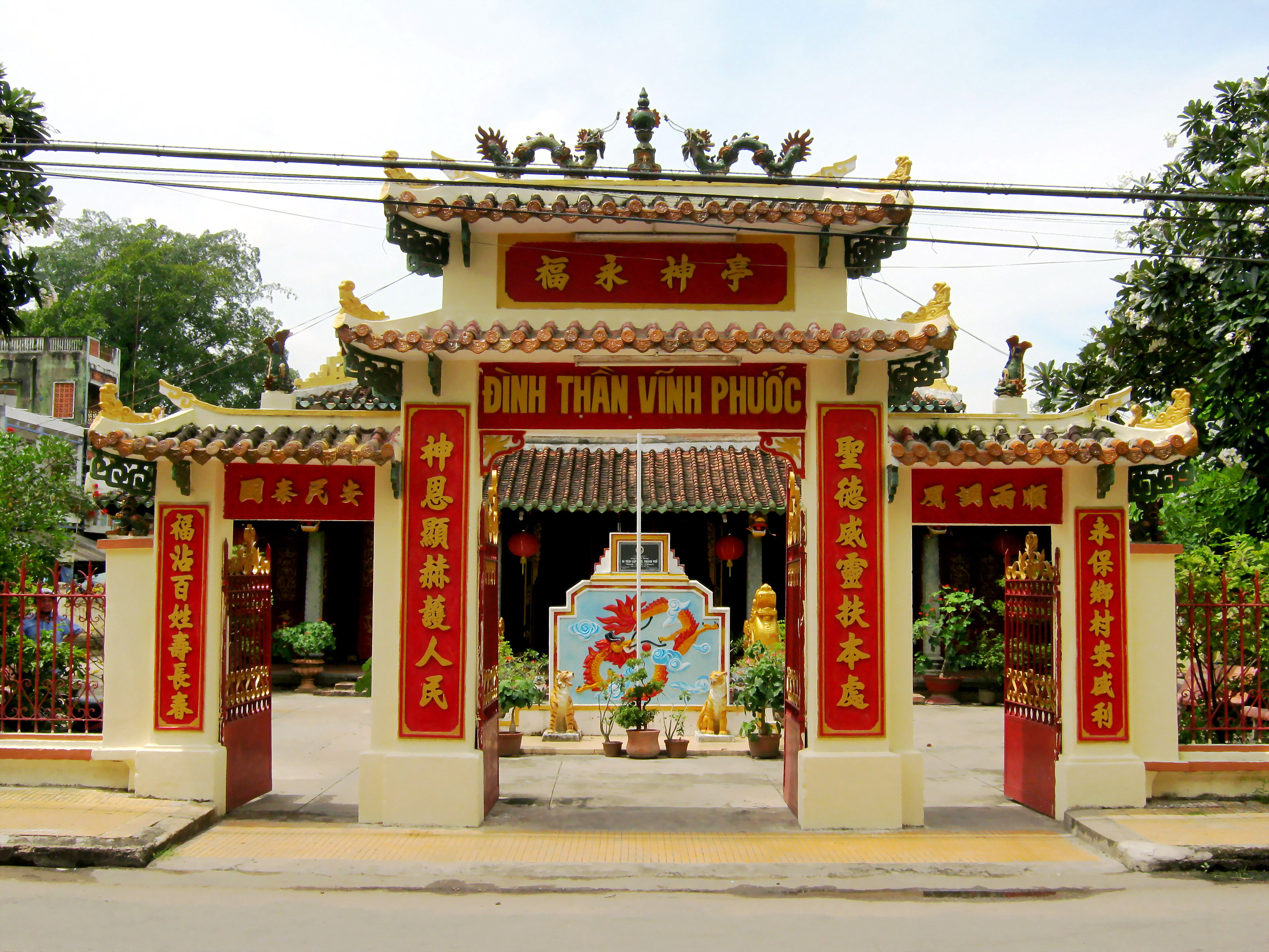
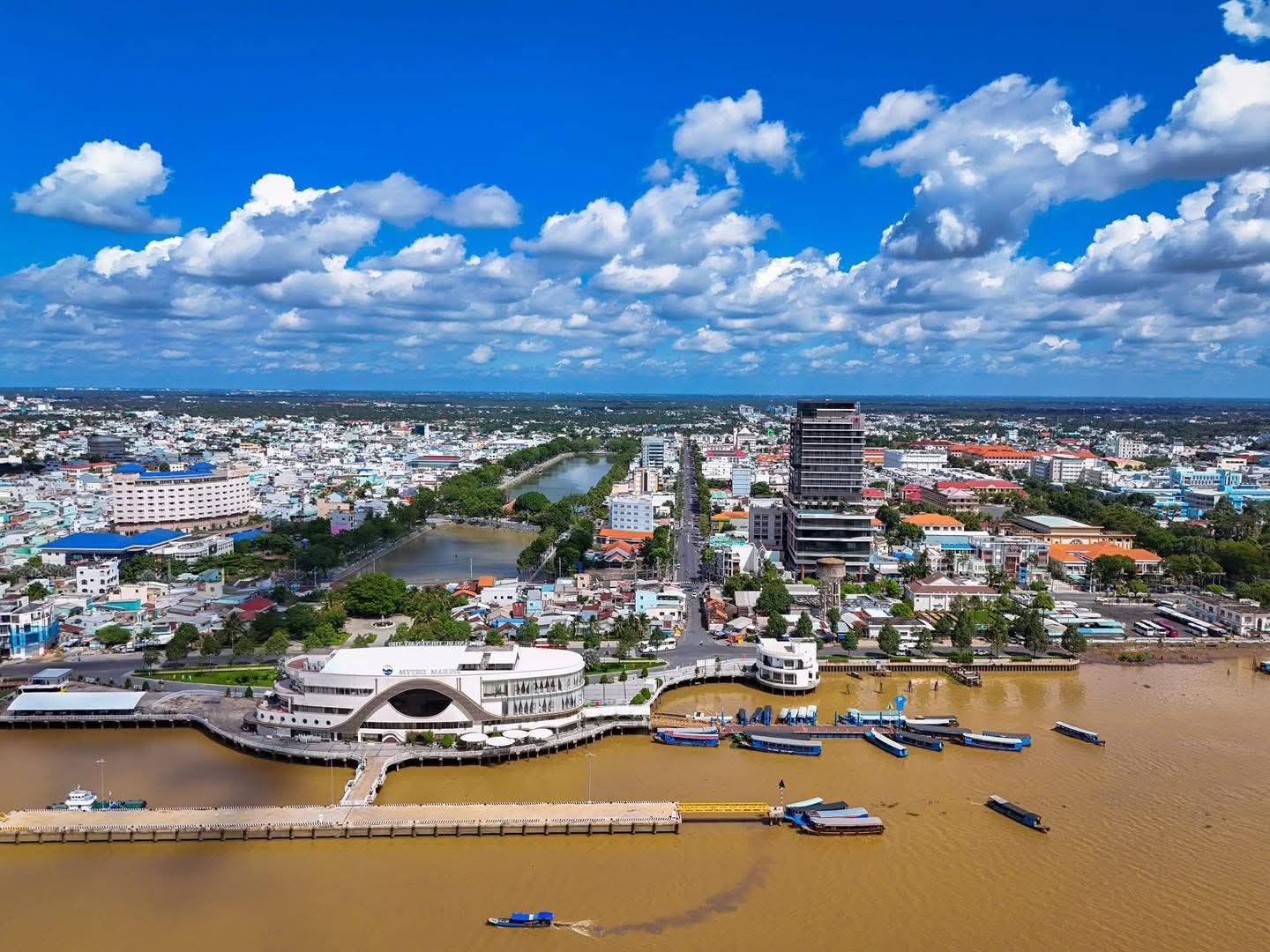
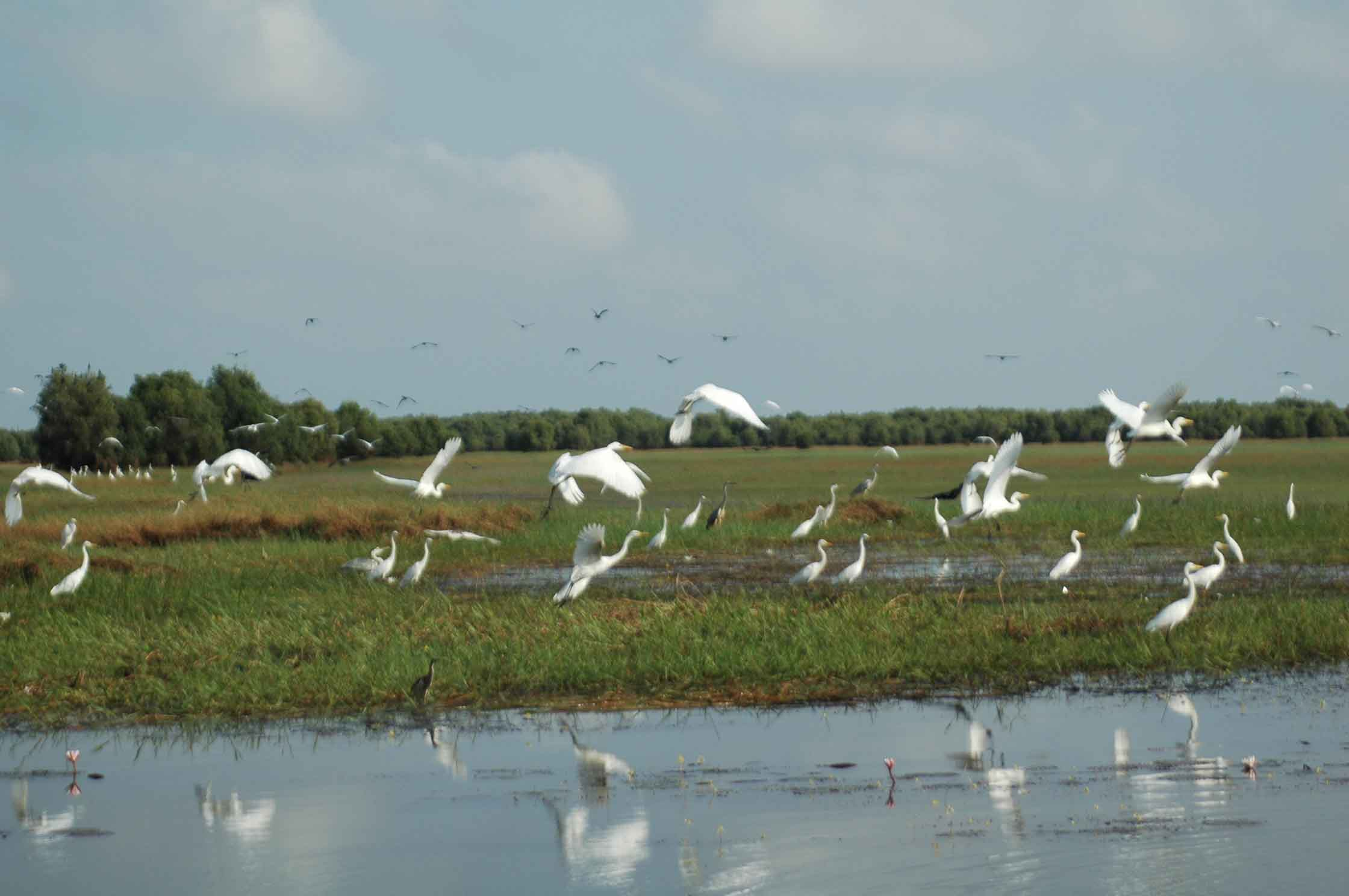
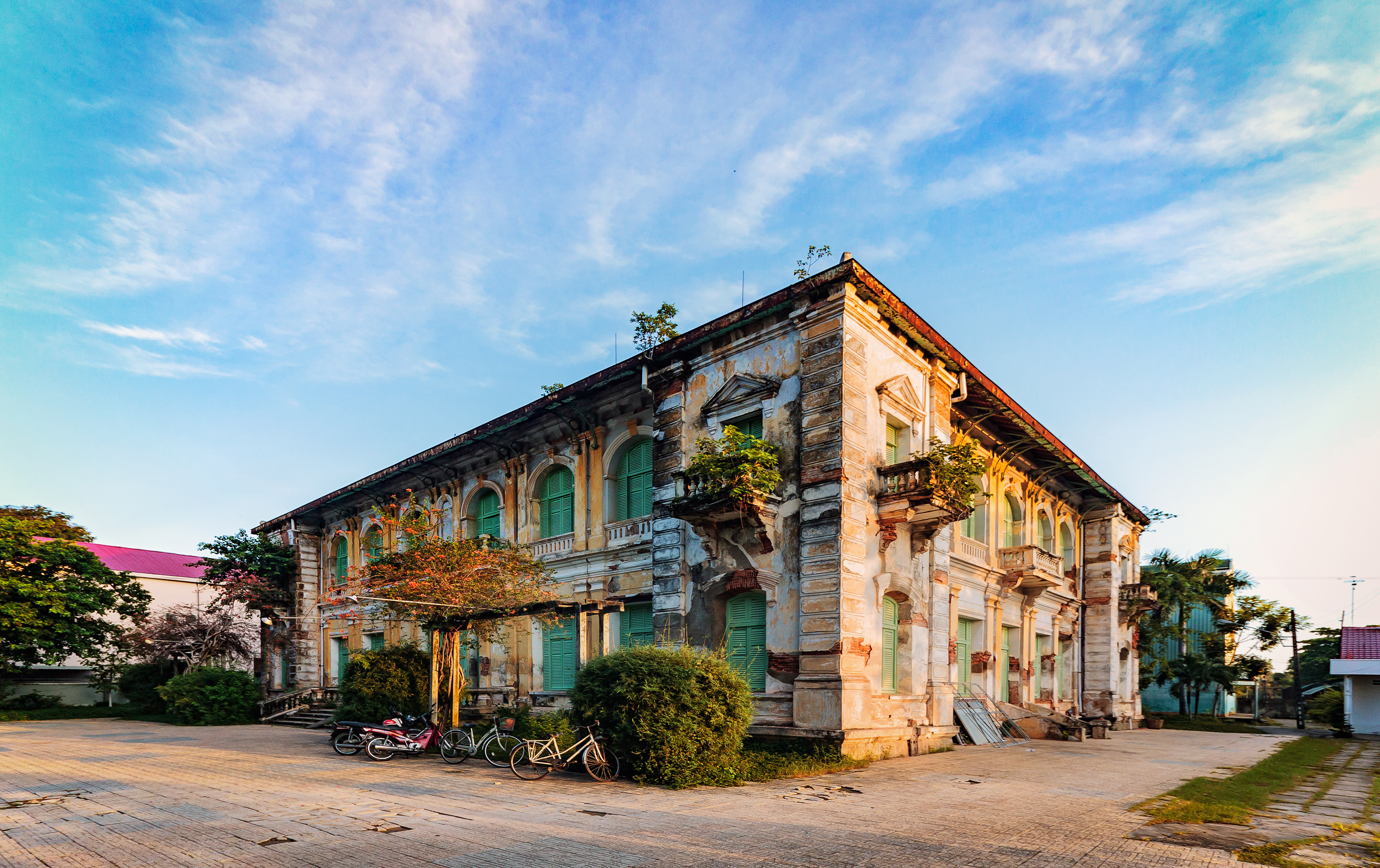
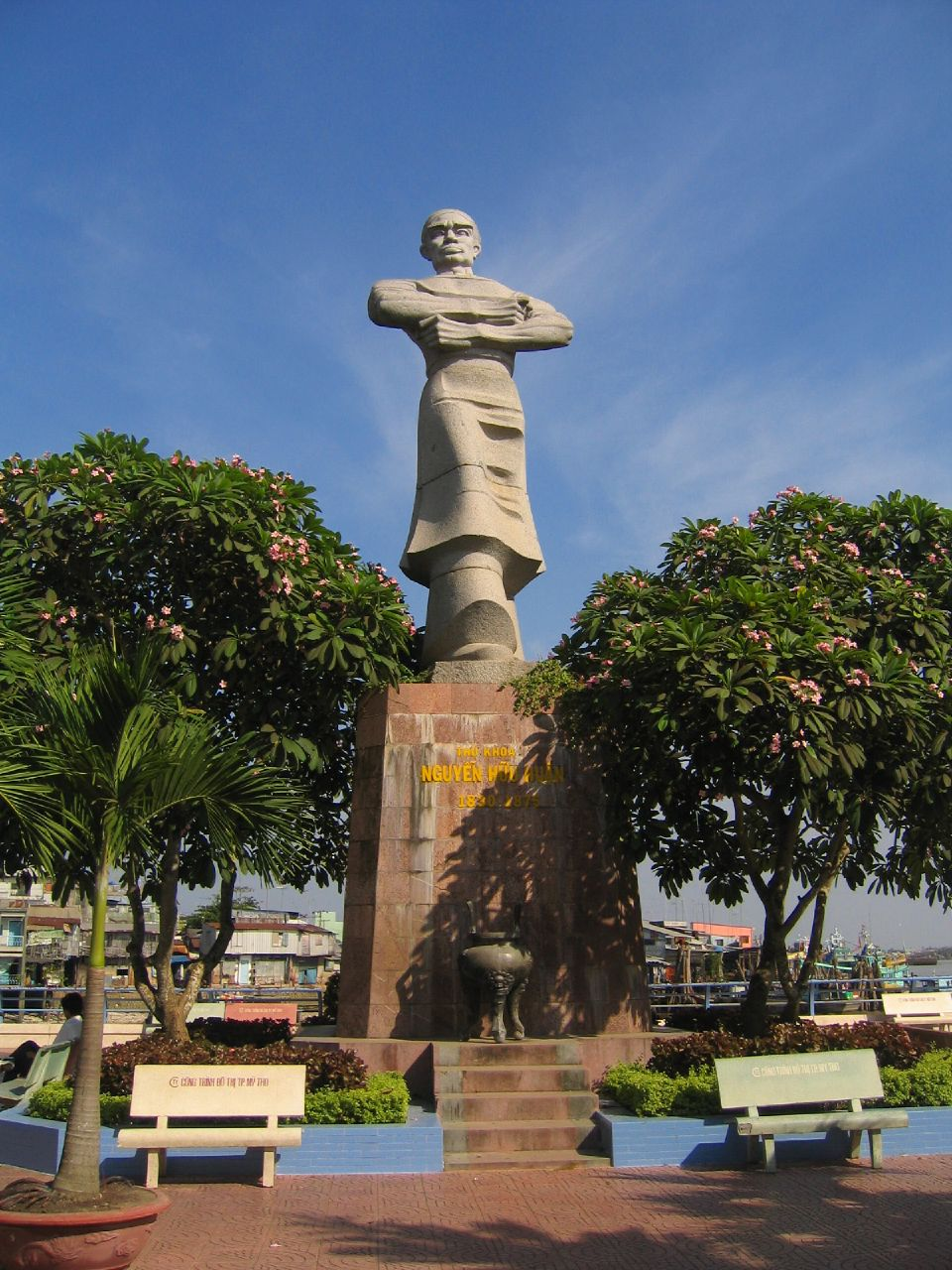
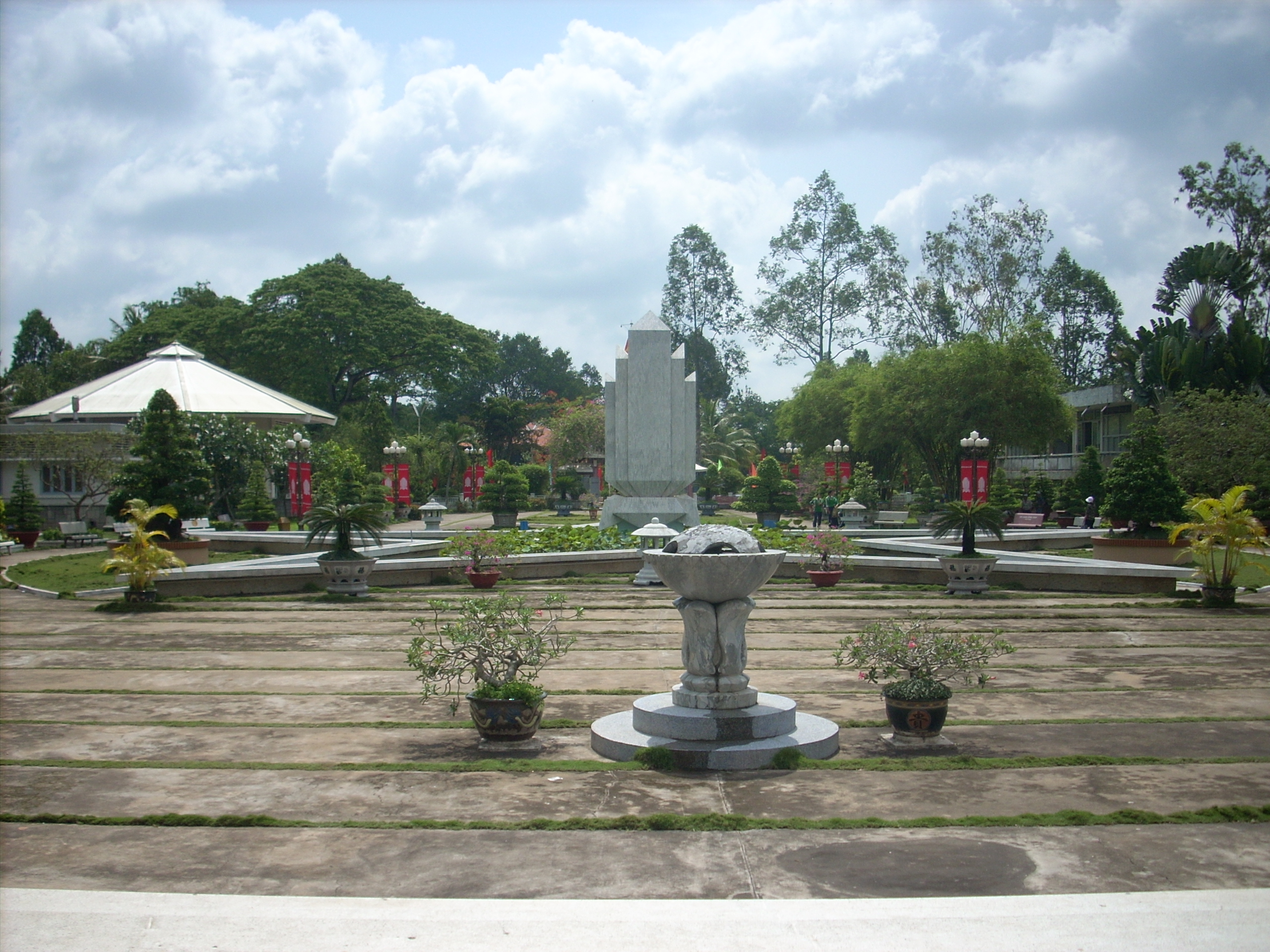
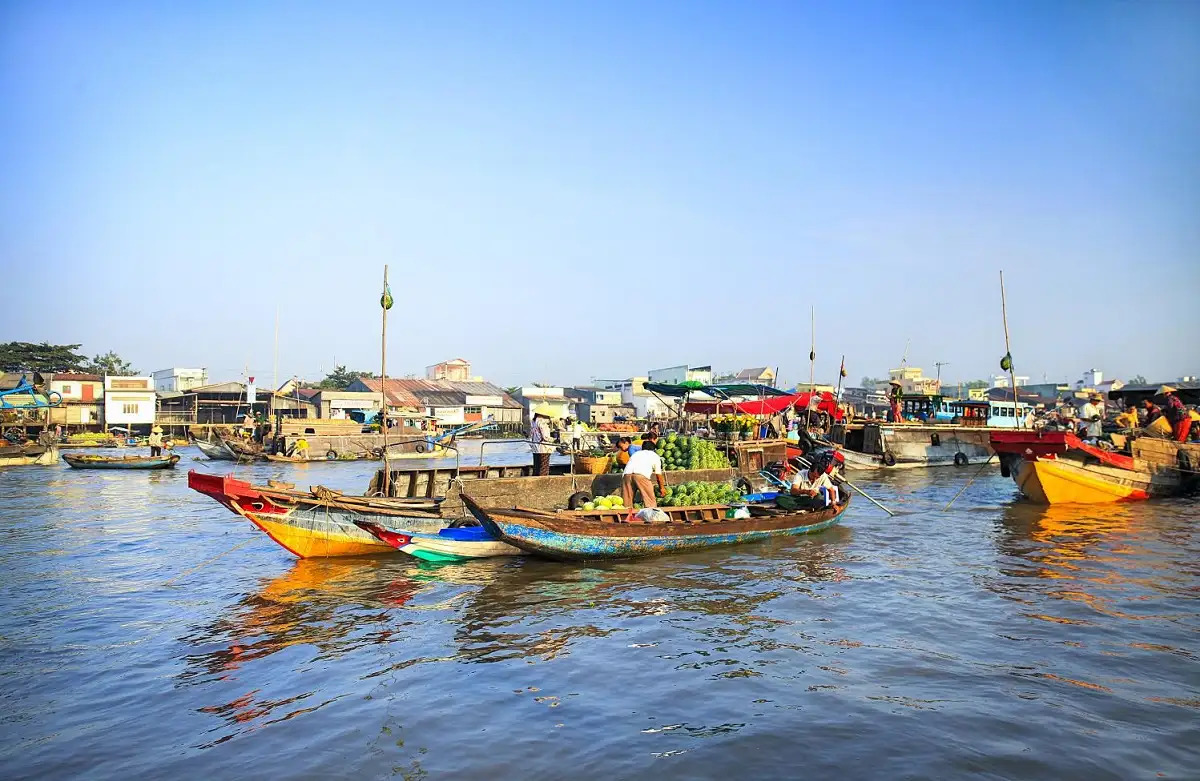
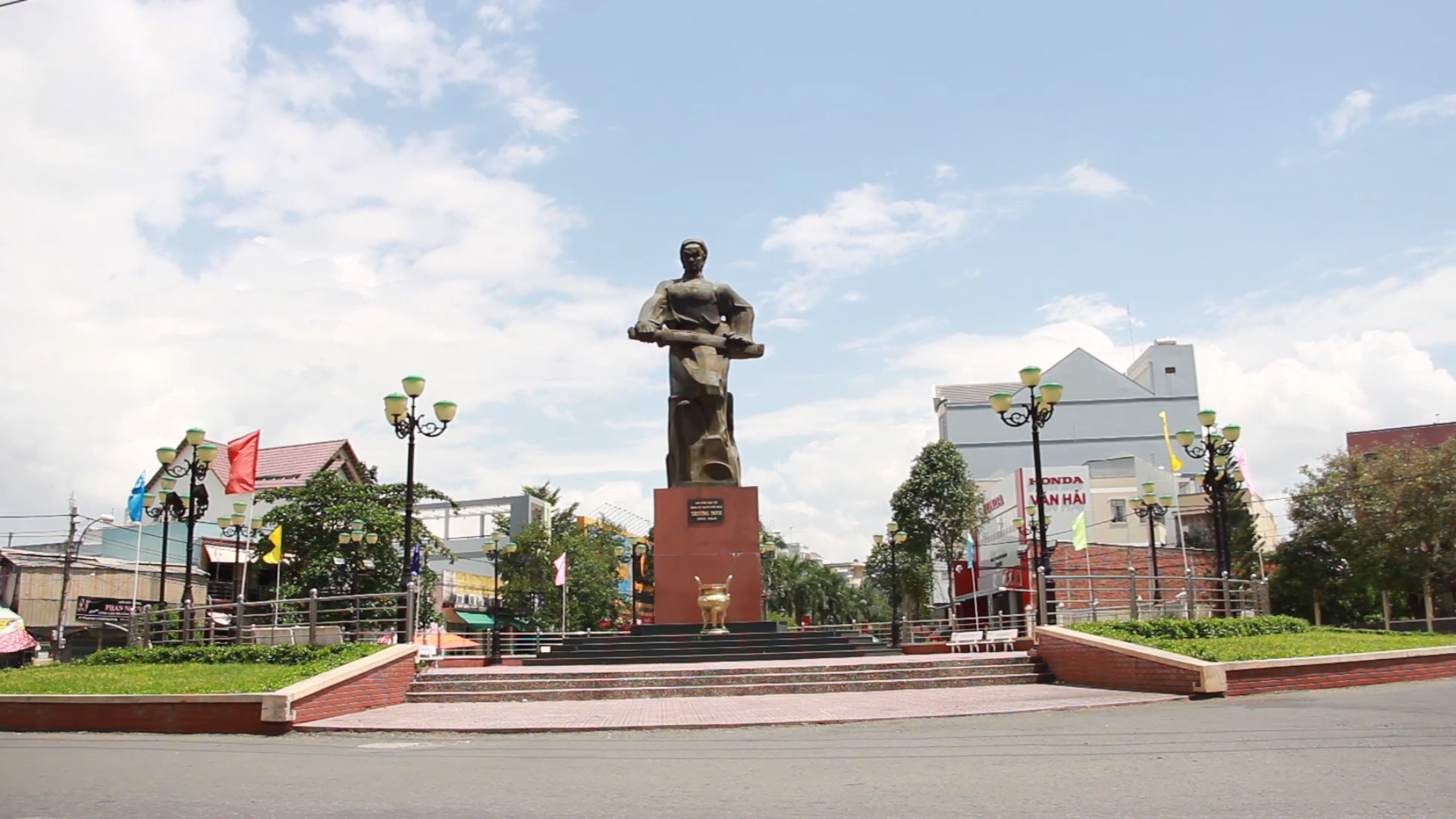
- Cao Lãnh Bridge Huỳnh Thủy Lê ancient house Vĩnh Phước temple View of Mỹ Tho ward Tràm Chim; National Park The Historic Site of the Gò Công Inspectorate Palace Statue of Thủ Khoa Huân in Mỹ Tho ward Mausoleum of Deputy Scholar Nguyễn Sinh Sắc Cái Bè; Floating Market Statue of Trương Định in Gò Công ward

- Seal
- Nickname(s): The Realm of Lotus; Fruit Kingdom; The first city of the Southern region
- Motto: Our potentialities - Your opportunities
- Location in Vietnam
- Interactive map of Đồng Tháp
- Coordinates: 10°40′N 105°40′E
- Country: Vietnam
- Region: Mekong Delta
- Capital: Mỹ Tho ward
- Subdivision: 31 wards, 71 communes

Government
  - Party Secretary: Ngô Chí Cường
  - People's Council Chair: Ngô Chí Cường
  - People's Committee Chair: Phạm Thành Ngại

Area
  - Total: 5,938.64 km^{2} (2,292.92 sq mi)

Population (2025)
  - Total: 4,370,046
  - Density: 735.866/km^{2} (1,905.89/sq mi)

Demographics
  - Ethnicities: Vietnamese, Khmer, Hoa

GDP
  - Total: VND 260.036 trillion US$ 9.86 million
- Time zone: UTC+7 (ICT)
- Area codes: 277 (from 17 Jun 2017); 67 (until 16 Jul 2017)
- ISO 3166 code: VN-45
- HDI (2020): ▲0.689 (45th)
- Website: dongthap.gov.vn

Đồng Tháp is a province located in the Mekong Delta region of Vietnam. The province was established in 1976 by merging the entire area and population of Kiến Phong and Sa Đéc provinces. The province has an area of 5,938.64 km², a projected population of 4,370,046 people in 2025. Đồng Tháp has a diversified economy, in which agriculture, industrial, commerce, service and tourism play important roles. The prominent products include rice, fruit, ornamental plant, and seafood. Administratively, Đồng Tháp province is divided into 102 commune-level administrative units, including 31 wards and 71 communes. The provincial administrative center is located in Mỹ Tho ward.

== History ==
Đồng Tháp is a newly cultivated area from the 17th and 18th centuries, under the Nguyễn lords. The foundation of this area adhered to a powerful struggling history against nature, dangerous animals and aggressors.

The south of Đồng Tháp province whose center is Sa Đéc plays a major role. Many researchers have shown that Vietnamese settlers went to Sa Đéc to establish and set up hamlets between the late 17th century and the early 18th century. Sa Đéc is a Khmer word meaning "iron market". Some questions about this market, such as whether it sold iron agricultural tools or whether the frame of the market was made of iron, has not had any reasonable explanation; however, Sa Đéc is probably considered the newest area on the way to develop the country in 1757 led by Nguyễn Cư Trinh, a general who was known for his achievement in resettling people from Quảng Ngãi.

After the emperor Gia Long defeated the Tây Sơn brothers, Gia Long pacified Sa Đéc and assigned it to Vĩnh An district. Sa Đéc, then with a favorable geographical location, did become the most crowded trading center of the Mekong Delta at that time, only smaller than Cholon within Saigon.

Cao Lãnh, located to the north of Tiền river, also has a glorious history. It is recorded in historical books that at the end of the 17th century, or early in the 18th century, Vietnamese settlers at Bả Canh hamlet (currently belonging to Đập Đá commune, Đập Đá town, Bình Định province) came to cultivate and settled down near Cái Sao Thượng rivulet, forming the Bả Canh commune. Nguyễn Tú was accredited with having gathered people, cultivated and set up hamlets. He was elevated to the status of Tiền Hiền - an anciently righteous person - of the village. Nowadays, that stele has been found near Đình Trung bridge, Ward 2, Cao Lãnh city.

Since 1976, Kiến Phong province and Sa Đéc province were merged to form Đồng Tháp Province as it exists today, with the provincial capital initially located in Sa Đéc district-level town.

On June 12, 2025, the National Assembly passed Resolution No. 202/2025/QH15, which took effect the same day, merging Tiền Giang province into Đồng Tháp Province.

Following the merger, Đồng Tháp covers 5,938.64 km^{2} and has a population of 4,370,046 people.

== Geography ==
=== Geographical location ===
Đồng Tháp province is one of the five provinces in the Mekong Delta, Vietnam. The province's territory extends from 10°07'N to 10°58'N and from 105°12'E to 106°47'E. The province has the following geographical location:

- To the north, it borders Tây Ninh province and Kingdom of Cambodia.
- To the south, it borders Vĩnh Long province.
- To the southwest, it borders Cần Thơ municipality.
- To the west, it borders An Giang province.
- To the east, it borders Hồ Chí Minh city (separated by the Soài Rạp river) and the East Sea.

The communes and wards that share a national border with Cambodia is: Thường Phước, Thường Lạc, Hồng Ngự, Tân Hồng Tân Hộ Cơ and Tân Thành is approximately 50km long with 4 border crossings, including: Thông Bình, Dinh Bà, Thường Phước and Mỹ Cân. The national route system includes routes 1, 30, 50, 80, 54 along with national routes N1, N2 connecting Đồng Tháp province with Hồ Chí Minh city and other provinces.

=== Topography ===
The topography of the province is quite flat with a sloping tendency from north to south and west to east, separating it into two large regions: one to the north of the Tiền River, having an area of 250,731 hectares (619,570 acres), in the Đồng Tháp Muoi area; and one to the south of the Tiền River, having an area of 73,074 hectares (180,570 acres), lying between the Tiền River and Hậu River. Đồng Tháp benefits from a large river, channel and spring system, frequently silt-aggraded soil, and a permanently fresh and non-saline water source.

=== Climate ===
The whole of Đồng Tháp is in the tropical climate zone. There are two main seasons; a rainy season from May to November, and a dry season from December to April. Average rainfall ranges from 1,682 millimetres (66.2 in) to 2,005 millimetres (78.9 in), mostly in the rainy season which accounts for 90 to 95 per cent of annual rainfall. This climate is fairly advantageous for agricultural development. The average temperature is 27 °C (81 °F), of which the highest is 34.3 °C (93.7 °F), and the lowest 21.8 °C (71.2 °F). The hydrology of the province is under the influence of three factors: floodwater from the upper Mekong River, in-field rain and the tides of the South China Sea. The hydrological regime is divided into two seasons: an exhausted season from December to June and a flood season from July to November.

== Administrative divisions ==
After the reorganization of commune-level administrative units in the province. Đồng Tháp province is divided into 102 commune-level administrative, including 31 wards and 71 communes:

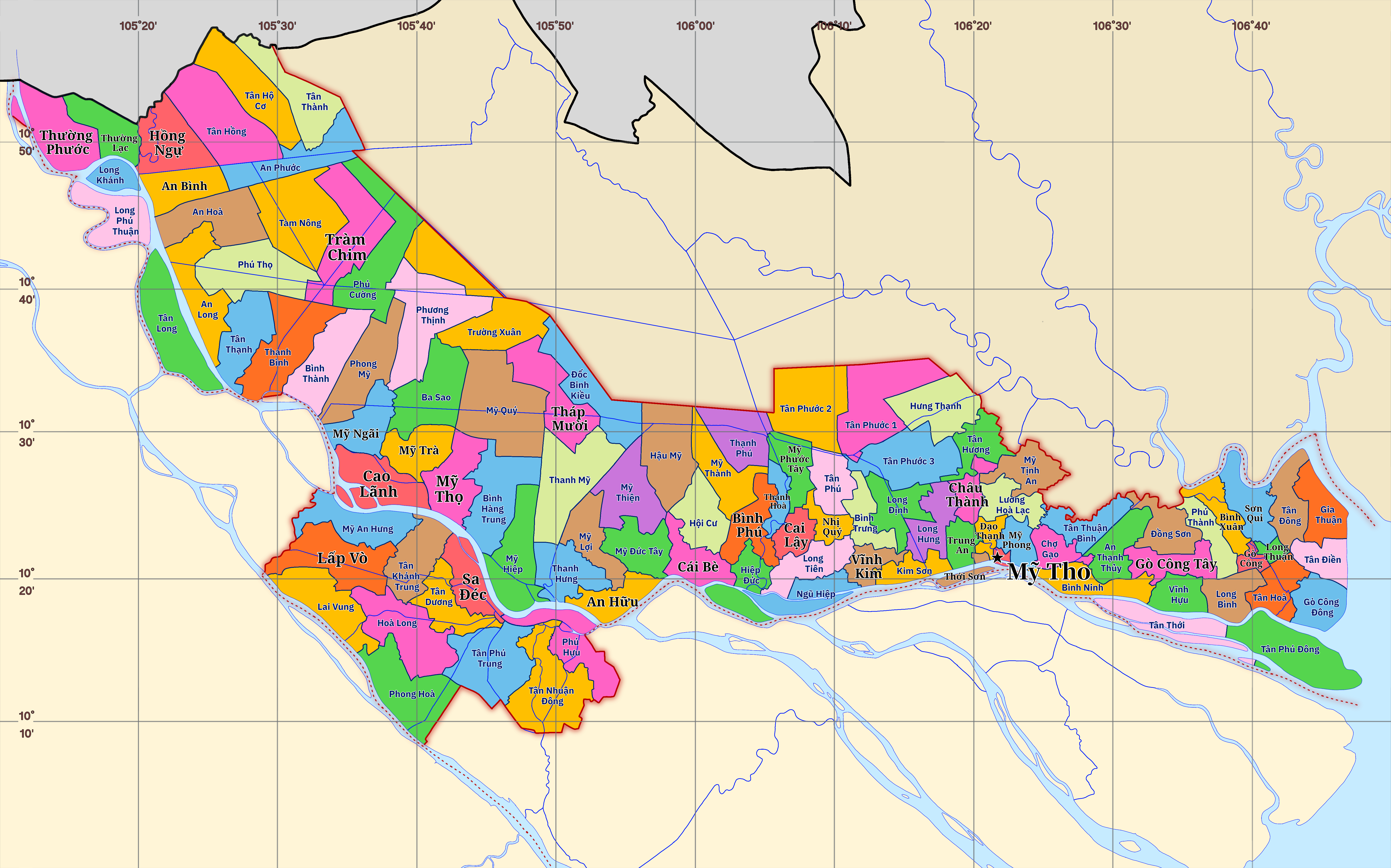
Administrative map of Đồng Tháp province from May 11th, 2026.

List of communes and wards in Đồng Tháp province

Name	Area (km²)	Population (people)
Wards (31)
An Bình	50,07	33.314
An Hữu	43,94	52.177
Bình Phú	47,33	51.081
Bình Xuân	34,42	32.574
Cái Bè	41,14	59.611
Cai Lậy	25,52	34.117
Cao Lãnh	73,33	137.387
Châu Thành	24,28	57.070
Đạo Thạnh	14,28	73.370
Gò Công	10,06	36.124
Gò Công Tây	39,78	44.540
Hồng Ngự	64,18	53.945
Lấp Vò	85,20	73.883
Long Thuận	8,26	29.715
Mỹ Ngãi	49,00	50.504
Mỹ Phong	23,00	50.731
Mỹ Phước Tây	36,05	40.730
Mỹ Tho	6,39	66.766
Mỹ Thọ	61,49	51.191
Mỹ Trà	46,27	46.757
Nhị Quý	21,36	27.568
Sa Đéc	46,92	104.509
Sơn Qui	48,96	46.507
Thanh Hòa	19,50	20.903
Tháp Mười	70,40	44.427
Thới Sơn	15,21	38.490
Thường Lạc	43,74	38.225
Thường Phước	80,74	59.864
Tràm Chim	90,23	22.725
Trung An	23,38	70.479
Vĩnh Kim	25,57	31.466

Name	Area (km²)	Population (people)
Communes (71)
An Hòa	77,89	19.033
An Long	72,19	50.050
An Phước	64,93	23.788
An Thạnh Thủy	42,67	41.198
Ba Sao	81,13	28.463
Bình Hàng Trung	78,22	39.533
Bình Ninh	46,64	36.131
Bình Thành	72,15	31.182
Bình Trưng	31,23	34.618
Chợ Gạo	25,17	33.793
Đốc Binh Kiều	77,82	28.797
Đồng Sơn	44,27	40.405
Gia Thuận	67,41	45.907
Gò Công Đông	106,41	30.104
Hậu Mỹ	78,61	40.097
Hiệp Đức	45,97	35.734
Hòa Long	81,31	68.886
Hội Cư	48,66	52.774
Hưng Thạnh	65,15	31.368
Kim Sơn	29,42	29.382
Lai Vung	71,24	80.649
Long Bình	36,62	30.788
Long Định	43,77	48.391
Long Hưng	43,25	47.304
Long Khánh	29,00	35.884
Long Phú Thuận	56,57	61.107
Long Tiên	44,64	43.997
Lương Hòa Lạc	35,28	37.661

Name	Area (km²)	Population (people)
Mỹ An Hưng	65,29	55.371
Mỹ Đức Tây	45,79	36.897
Mỹ Hiệp	79,42	54.577
Mỹ Lợi	43,76	33.781
Mỹ Quí	119,88	36.223
Mỹ Thành	52,30	35.768
Mỹ Thiện	62,59	27.745
Mỹ Tịnh An	41,21	36.958
Ngũ Hiệp	47,94	40.635
Phong Hòa	87,88	71.537
Phong Mỹ	78,58	31.182
Phú Cường	89,91	21.122
Phú Hựu	71,28	68.475
Phú Thành	31,92	25.135
Phú Thọ	84,90	30.372
Phương Thịnh	104,65	21.675
Tam Nông	102,67	21.031
Tân Dương	46,67	46.069
Tân Điền	39,01	22.130
Tân Đông	50,35	51.413
Tân Hòa	37,96	34.149
Tân Hồng	102,79	39.974
Tân Hộ Cơ	77,5	25.026
Tân Hương	35,05	67.210
Tân Khánh Trung	60,13	46.858
Tân Long	94,86	76.717
Tân Nhuận Đông	92,01	59.576
Tân Phú	38,58	31.360
Tân Phú Đông	175,15	23.630
Tân Phú Trung	82,63	62.831

Name	Area (km²)	Population (people)
Tân Phước 1	95,39	12.836
Tân Phước 2	89,40	10.849
Tân Phước 3	80,19	11.927
Tân Thành	64,82	30.611
Tân Thạnh	59,51	30.740
Tân Thới	65,83	32.116
Tân Thuận Bình	39,94	40.031
Thanh Bình	85,99	47.410
Thanh Hưng	51,89	46.314
Thanh Mỹ	93,15	33.096
Thạnh Phú	56,64	28.431
Trường Xuân	113,76	18.124
Vĩnh Hựu	31,89	24.210

== Transport ==
The highways in and out of the province are Highway 80, Highway 30, Highway 54, Highway N2. Air travel is served by Cần Thơ International Airport which is approximately 80 kilometres (50 mi) south of Đồng Tháp. However, the province would also use Ho Chi Minh City's Tân Sơn Nhất International Airport which is approximately 152 kilometres (94 mi) north east of Đồng Tháp.

== Economy ==
=== Growth of agriculture and aquaculture ===
Enjoying a temperate climate, wide irrigation system, permanent freshwater source supplied by the Tiền and Hậu rivers, and rich river deposits, the agriculture of Đồng Tháp keeps growing. At present, Đồng Tháp is the 3rd largest rice paddy in Vietnam with a planted area of 462,042 ha and paddy output of more than 2.8 million tons. Apart from rice, the province also has more than 38,000 ha for secondary and annual industrial crops. Some farm produce zones across the Tiền and Hậu rivers have been built up as specializing areas which supply agricultural products to serve the need of processing and export.

The Sa Đéc flower village – one of the largest flower villages in Vietnam, at nearly 300 ha wide – provides more than 12 million types of flower and ornamental plant, both locally and overseas every year, taking up a significant proportion of the economic growth target of the province. The village has been further invested to enhance its quality, preserve and develop particular local flowers, and apply advanced biotechnology in breeding to raise floriculture as a potential line of production and develop it to be one of the major ecotourism sites of the province. The Sa Đéc flower village has attracted a large number of tourists, considered one of the most-visited destinations before the Lunar New Year. The tourists can admire the beauty of many different kinds of beautiful flowers blooming and enjoy the New Year atmosphere at the largest supplier of flowers for the southern region during Tết.

Đồng Tháp is also well known for fruits such as the Cao Lãnh mango, Lai Vung mandarin, Châu Thành longan and Phong Hoà grapefruit (able to produce fruit during the year), which bring about high economic values for gardeners. Fruit trees' output can reach more than 150,000 tons per annum. Within the province, there are various typical orchards having been specialized to produce consistent quality fruits, which aims at building up brand names and meeting export requirements.

With a large river body, fishery, after rice, is another important industry of the province. Aquaculture is widely developed all over the region, especially catfish and blue-legged prawn. The water surface area for aquatic breeding reaches 5,285 ha, where farmers focus on breeding prawns in rice fields and fish in warps along the Tiền and Hậu rivers. Each year, Đồng Tháp supplies over 290,000 tons of fish and a thousand tons of blue-legged prawns for export processing, accomplishing an export turnover of US$100 million.

== Culture ==
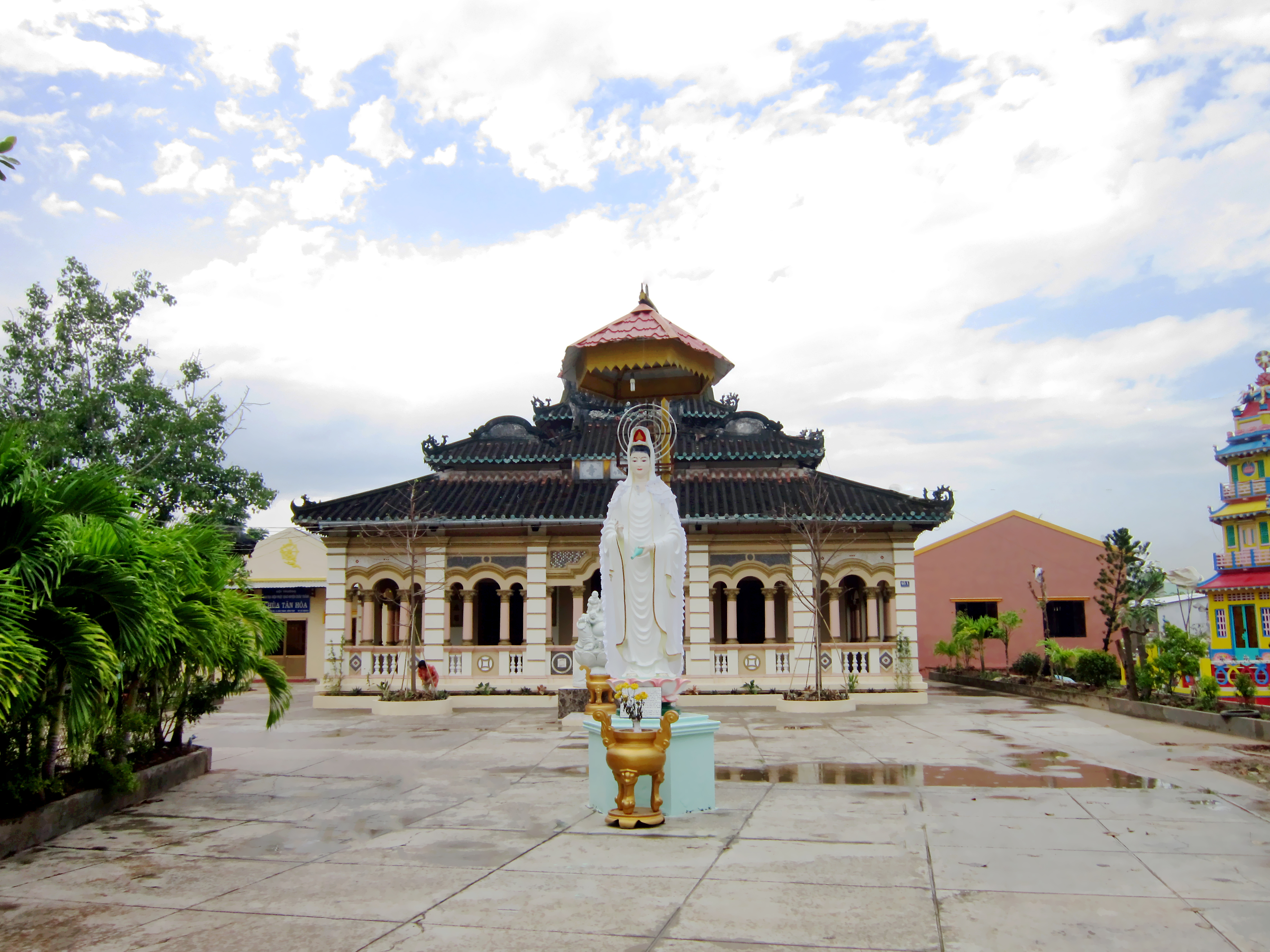
Tân Hòa Temple, Phú Hựu commune , Đồng Tháp province

=== Buddhism ===
Đồng Tháp has, since December 22, 2008, the largest Buddha statue of the Mekong Delta, built in Quan Âm Pagoda: "The sculpture, 32 meters long and weighing 100 tons, is that of Buddha lying on his side on a lotus petal, his right arm supporting his head and his left arm lying along his body. Buddhist scriptures say the Buddha assumed this position when he attained Nirvana, the release from the cycle of death and rebirth of an enlightened person. Thich Giac An of Quan Âm Pagoda, which from today will be home to the statue, said many Buddhists and locals contributed the 2,000 sacks of cement, five tons of iron and many other necessary materials worth VND1.6 billion (US$94,000) needed to build the statue. Quan Âm Pagoda, founded 200 years ago by a mandarin named Tran Quy Tanh, receives many devotees from across the country for major Buddhist festivals."

=== Tourism ===
Generous natural conditions and a submerged inland ecosystem have awarded Đồng Tháp with multiple valuable ecotourism resources, for example, Tràm Chim National Park, known both locally and internationally. This is a miniature ecological model of Đồng Tháp Mười and the habitat of red-head cranes – a precious bird species protected by the world. Tràm Chim National Park also achieves 7 out of 9 criteria in the Ramsar list of wetlands of international importance. Also of importance is the Gáo Giồng ecotourism site. This is a 2,000 ha complex of cajeput forest where more than 15 species of precious bird live, nest and lay eggs. Additionally, the site offers a rich variety of aquatic resources.

Situated by the bank of the Tiền River, the flower village of Sa Đéc is the homeland of hundreds of "uncanny flowers and strange herbs". The village – one of the flower centers in the south of Vietnam – covers an area of around 300 ha for planting flowers and ornamental trees. Here, scarce and priceless bonsai hundreds of years old can be seen. In addition to the economic importance shown in high incomes brought to the regional economy, Sa Đéc flowers also include cultural, art, esthetic and environmental-protecting values. Having been planned for construction, the Sa Đéc flower village will soon become an interesting tourist site bearing original particularities of the Mekong Delta.

Đồng Tháp also has a long-term history with different cultural and historical relics. The Gò Tháp historic site is a national cultural and historic site with a complex of 5 typical relics: Gò Tháp Mười, Co Tu Towel, tomb and monument of Đốc binh Kiều, Gò Minh Sư and Bà Chúa Xứ Temple. Archaeologists have also discovered the Óc Eo cultural relics of the Phù Nam Kingdom, which existed around 1,500 years ago. Gò Tháp, in the centre of the vast Đồng Tháp Mười, still maintains a wide ecological environment and beautiful landscapes. The Ministry of Culture – Sports and Tourism has approved the project of constructing an ecotourism site in Gò Tháp with recreational areas, including a 10-storey Lotus culinary tower, Tháp Mười wildlife conservation and showroom site, a historical and religious relics preservation and introduction site and an ecological site with various lotus ponds, cajeput forests and bird grounds and fishing. The south regional committee relic is anticipated to be built and restored. Moreover, Gò Tháp festival (occurring in March and November each year) with cultural and art activities and a folk festive atmosphere has become a remarkable event in the southern provinces, which attracts hundreds of thousands of visitors. Meeting spiritual needs of all levels, religious and cultural tourism in Gò Tháp is an interesting and particular form of tourism which has a potential to grow. Xẻo Quýt relic – the revolutionary base during the US resistance war of wetlands – is covered with 20 ha of primary cajeput forest and contains relics restoring part of the historical period of the previous Kiến Phong provincial committee.

The revered Nguyễn Sinh Sắc historical site with an extended area of nearly 11 ha located in Cao Lãnh city is a construction work to commemorate Nguyễn Sinh Sắc – the father of President Ho Chi Minh. Within the site, the ancient Hòa An traditional village is also restored with Cái Tôm canal, garden, coconut trees, plum trees, mango trees, monkey bridge, bamboo bridge, village wandering paths along the site, especially ancient houses such as "Dinh"-like (a Chinese character) houses, Bat Dan house, San house and Nóc Ngừa house.

In Đồng Tháp, tourists can do activities such as listening to sweet and tormenting Đồng Tháp chanteys on borderless lotus fields or rice fields, visiting the ancient architecture remains of sites such as Kiến An Cung Pagoda (Ong Quach pagoda), Gò Quản Cung – Giồng Thị Đạm monument, Đốc Binh Vàng Palace worshipping Trần Văn Năng, a famous general, or visiting places such as Mỹ An crane garden.

Traditional trade villages is one of the strengths to developing tourism in Đồng Tháp such as: Định Yên mats, Rạch Bà Đài building yard village, Long Thuận towel weaving village, Hồng Ngự fish breeding village, specialties such as Lai Vung mandarin, Châu Thành longan, Cao Lãnh mango, Phong Hòa grapefruit, Lai Vung nem (fermented pork), Hòa An plum, Sa Giang shrimp cracker, and Sa Đéc noodle, and folk dishes such as grilled field mice, "dien dien" flower sour soup, braised anabas fish in clay pot, grilled snakehead fish in young lotus leaf, snakes, frogs, and pickled mud fish are also advantages for tourism that attract visitors to come and enjoy.

Lotus has long been a particular plant of Đồng Tháp Mười, which is now invested to plant in centralization to take seeds for export.

Large-scale tourism investment projects are being implemented such as Bau Dong tourism site near Dinh Ba border gate, Mekong tourism site – Hồng Ngự town and the wet rice culture tourism rite of Lấp Vò district, which will create a difference for Đồng Tháp tourism products from others in the Mekong Delta once they are completed.

== Demographic ==
Historical population
Year	Pop.	±%
1990	1,395,700	—
1991	1,414,100	+1.3%
1992	1,431,300	+1.2%
1993	1,449,600	+1.3%
1994	1,470,700	+1.5%
1995	1,489,300	+1.3%
1996	1,510,400	+1.4%
1997	1,532,500	+1.5%
1998	1,556,500	+1.6%
1999	1,568,200	+0.8%
2000	1,580,600	+0.8%
2001	1,592,200	+0.7%
2002	1,603,500	+0.7%
2003	1,614,300	+0.7%
2004	1,626,600	+0.8%
2005	1,639,500	+0.8%
2006	1,646,800	+0.4%
2007	1,654,500	+0.5%
2008	1,662,500	+0.5%
2009	1,666,600	+0.2%
2010	1,669,600	+0.2%
2011	1,671,700	+0.1%
2012	1,675,000	+0.2%
2013	1,678,400	+0.2%
2014	1,681,300	+0.2%
2015	1,684,400	+0.2%
2016	1,687,500	+0.2%
2017	1,690,600	+0.2%
2018	1,693,700	+0.2%
2019	1,598,800	−5.6%
2020	1,600,000	+0.1%
Dec. 31, 2020	1,803,300	+12.7%
2021	1,601,300	−11.2%
Dec 31, 2021	2,024,066	+26.4%
2022	1,600,200	−20.9%
Dec 31, 2022	1,933,030	+20.8%
2023	1,600,200	−17.2%
2024	1,601,100	+0.1%
Dec 31, 2024	2,108,850	+31.7%
Jun 12, 2025	4,370,046	+107.2%
Dec 31, 2025	4,403,776	+0.8%

In 2022, Đồng Tháp province had an area of 3,382 km² and a population of 1,933,030 people.

In 2024, Đồng Tháp province has an area of 3,382.28 km² and population is 1,601,120 people of which the male population is estimated at approximately 801,320 people (50.05%) and the male population is estimated at approximately 799,800 people (40.95%). The urban population is estimated at approximately 328,610 people (20.52%) and the rural population is estimated at approximately 1,272,510 people (79.48%),

As of June 12, 2025, Đồng Tháp has an area of 5,938.64 km² and a population (as of December 31, 2024) of 4,370,046 people.

According to statistics from the General Statistics Office of Vietnam (in April 1, 2009), Đồng Tháp province has 21 ethnic groups and foreigners living together. Of these, the Viet people (Kinh) is the largest with 1,663,718 people, followed by the Hoa people with 1,855 people and the Khmer people with 657 people. The remainder are other ethnic groups.
