= Phương Thịnh =

- Commune
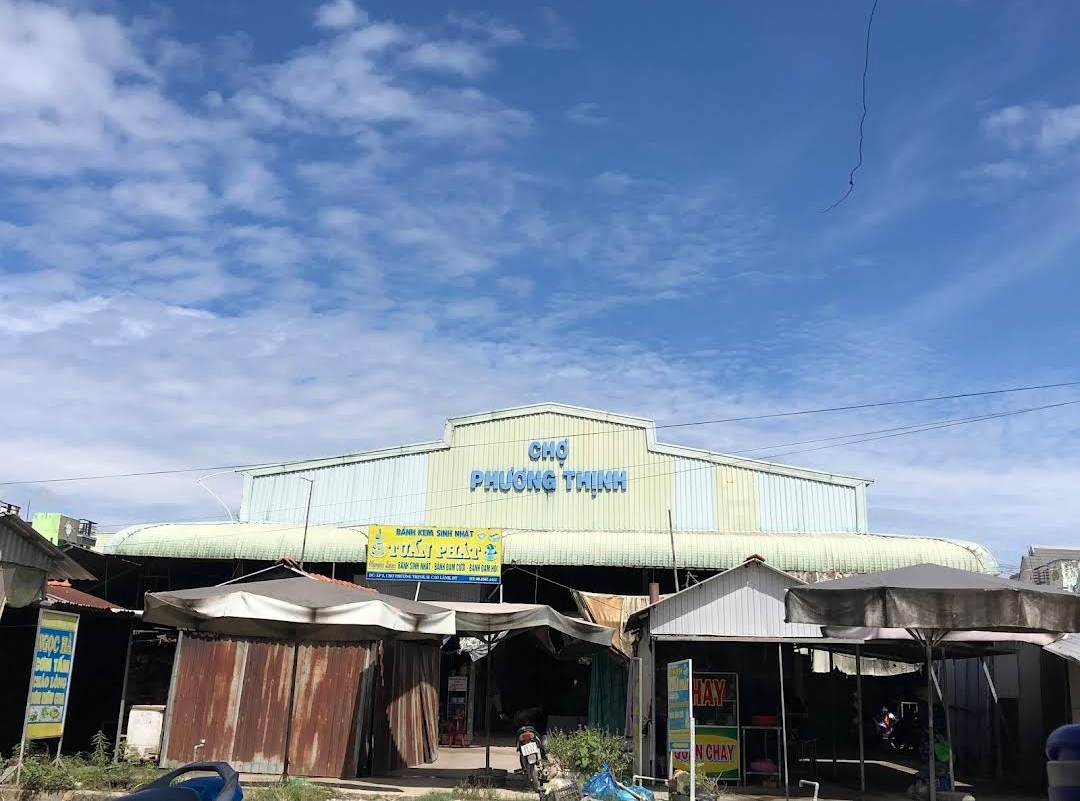
- Phương Thịnh market
- Interactive map of Phương Thịnh
- Country: Vietnam
- Province: Đồng Tháp
- Establish: June 16, 2025

Area
  - Total: 104.65 km^{2} (40.41 sq mi)

Population (2025)
  - Total: 21,675 people
  - Density: 207.12/km^{2} (536.44/sq mi)
- Time zone: UTC+07:00

Phương Thịnh is a commune in Đồng Tháp province, Vietnam. It is one of 102 communes and wards in the province.

== Geography ==
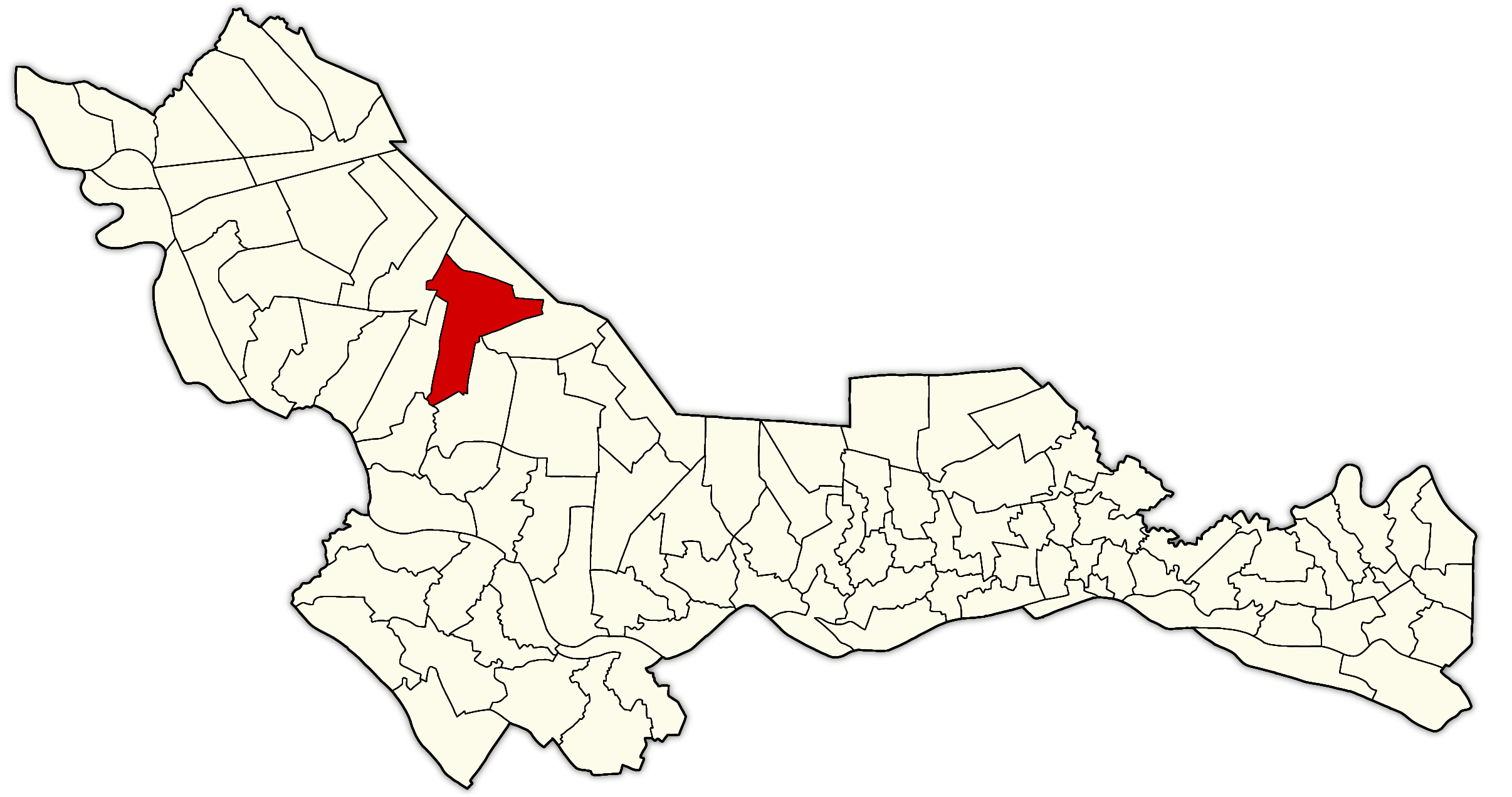
Location of Phương Thịnh commune on Đồng Tháp province map (highlight in red).

Phương Thịnh commune has a geographical location:

- To the north and northeast, it borders Trường Xuân commune.
- To the south and southeast, it borders Ba Sao commune.
- To the southwest it borders Mỹ Ngãi ward.
- To the west, it borders Phong Mỹ commune and Phú Cường commune.

== History ==
Before 2025, Phương Thịnh commune was formerly Phương Thịnh commune (belonging to Cao Lãnh district) and Hưng Thạnh commune (formerly part of Tháp Mười district) all belonging to Đồng Tháp province.

On June 12, 2025, the National Assembly of Vietnam issued Resolution No. 202/2025/QH15 on the reorganization of provincial-level administrative units. Accordingly:

- Đồng Tháp province was established by merging the entire area and population of Đồng Tháp province and Tiền Giang province.

On June 16, 2025, the Standing Committee of the National Assembly of Vietnam issued Resolution No. 1663/NQ-UBTVQH15 on the rearrangement of commune-level administrative units in Đồng Tháp province. Accordingly:

- Phương Thịnh commune was established by merging the entire area and population of Phương Thịnh commune (formerly part of Cao Lãnh district) and Hưng Thạnh commune (formerly part of Tháp Mười district).
- After reorganization, Phương Thịnh commune has an area of 104.7 km² and a population of 21,675 people.
