= Mỹ An (disambiguation) =

Mỹ An may refer to several places in Vietnam, including:

- Mỹ An, a commune of Tây Ninh province
- Mỹ An, Đà Nẵng, a former ward of Ngũ Hành Sơn district
- Mỹ An (township), a former township and capital of Tháp Mười district in Đồng Tháp province
- Mỹ An, An Giang, a former commune of Chợ Mới district, An Giang
- Mỹ An, Bắc Giang, a former commune of Lục Ngạn district
- Mỹ An, Vĩnh Long, a former commune of Mang Thít district
- Mỹ An, Bình Định, a former commune of Phù Mỹ district
- Mỹ An, Bến Tre, a former commune of Thạnh Phú district
- Mỹ An (commune in Đồng Tháp), a former commune of Tháp Mười district
