= Mỹ Quí =

Mỹ Quí Mỹ Quý
- Commune
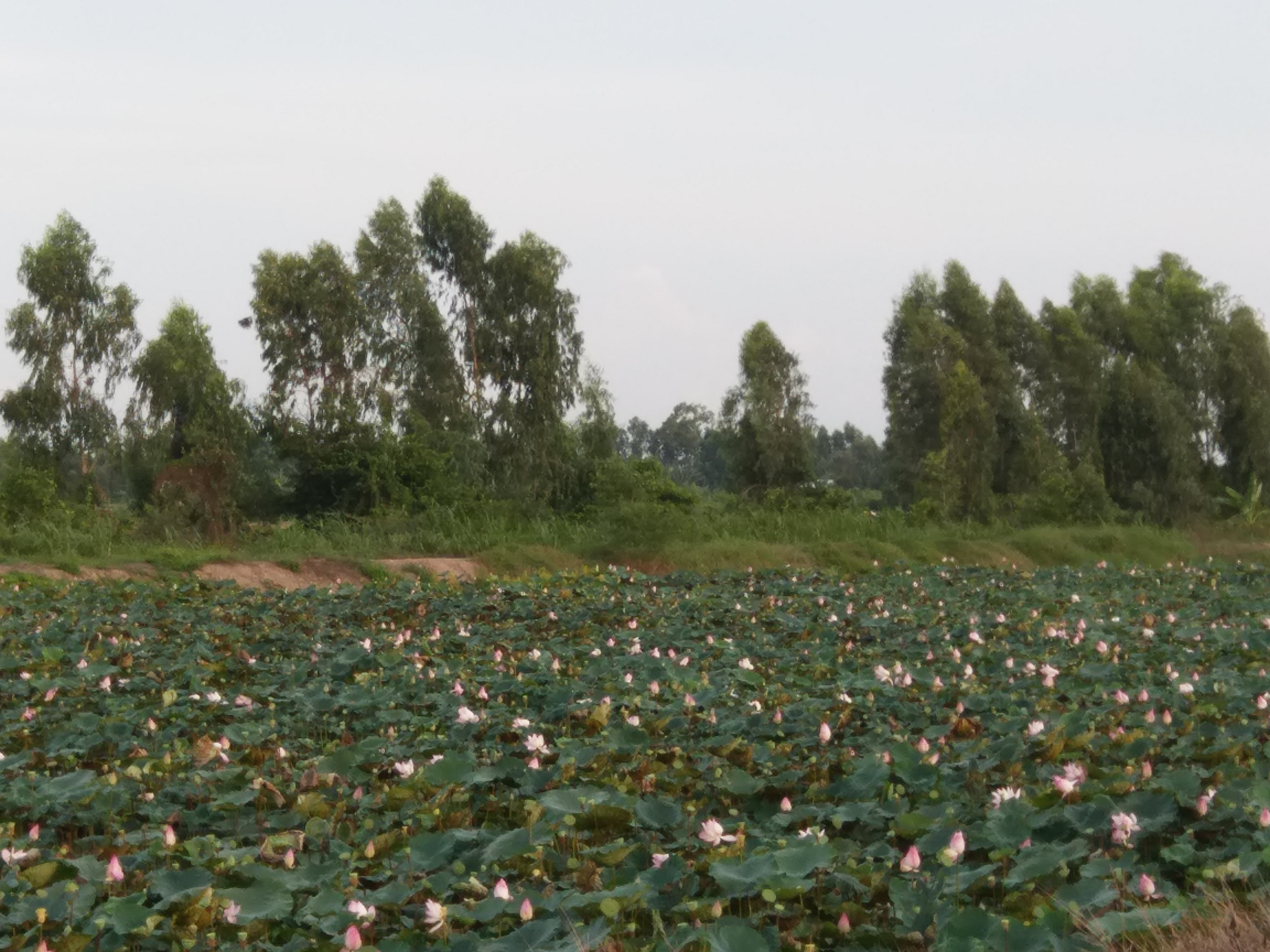
- A lotus field
- Country: Vietnam
- Province: Đồng Tháp
- Establish: June 16, 2025

Area
  - Total: 119.88 km^{2} (46.29 sq mi)

Population (2025)
  - Total: 36,223 people
  - Density: 302.16/km^{2} (782.59/sq mi)
- Time zone: UTC+07:00

Mỹ Quí (also write is Mỹ Quý); is a commune in Đồng Tháp province, Vietnam. It is one of 102 communes and wards in the province following the 2025 reorganization.

== Geography ==
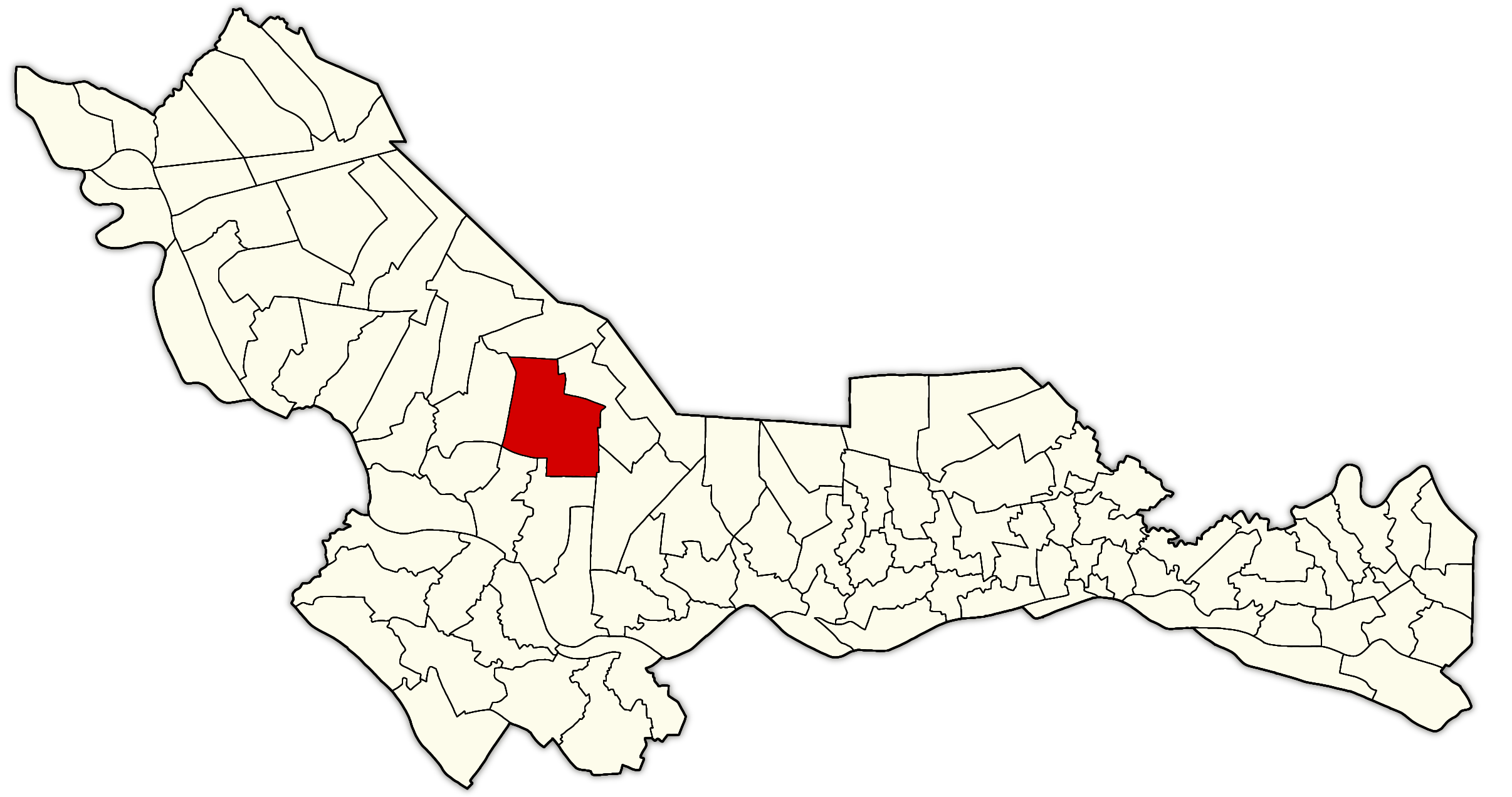
Location of Mỹ Quí commune on Đồng Tháp province map (highlight in red).

Mỹ Quí commune has the following geographical location:

- To the south, it borders Mỹ Thọ ward and Bình Hàng Trung commune.
- To the west, it borders Ba Sao commune.
- To the north, it borders Trường Xuân commune.
- To the northeast, it borders Tháp Mười ward.
- To the southeast, it borders Thanh Mỹ commune.

== History ==
Prior to 2025, Mỹ Quí commune consisted of Mỹ Đông, Mỹ Quí, and Láng Biển communes in Tháp Mười district, Đồng Tháp province.

On June 12, 2025, the National Assembly of Vietnam issued Resolution No. 202/2025/QH15 on the reorganization of provincial-level administrative units. Accordingly:

- Đồng Tháp province was established by merging the entire area and population of Đồng Tháp province and Tiền Giang province.

On June 16, 2025, the Standing Committee of the National Assembly of Vietnam issued Resolution No. 1663/NQ-UBTVQH15 on the reorganization of commune-level administrative units in Đồng Tháp province. Accordingly:

- Mỹ Quí commune was established by merging the entire area and population of Mỹ Đông commune, Mỹ Quí commune, and Láng Biển commune (formerly part of Tháp Mười district).
