= Đốc Binh Kiều, Đồng Tháp =

Đốc Binh Kiều
- Commune
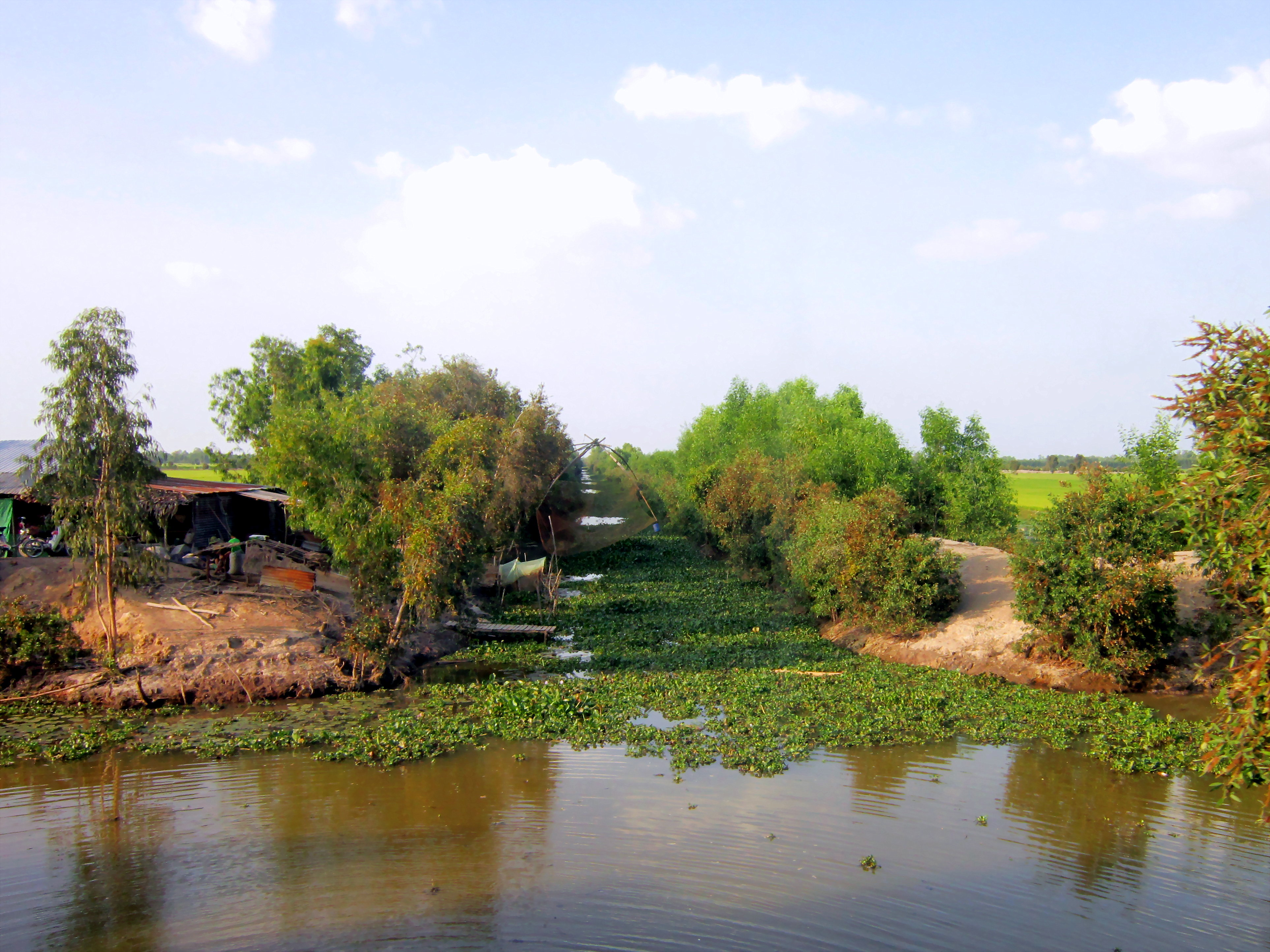
- A rural view
- Country: Vietnam
- Province: Đồng Tháp
- Establish: June 16, 2025

Area
  - Total: 77.82 ha (192.3 acres)

Population (2025)
  - Total: 28,797 people
  - Density: 37,000/km^{2} (95,840/sq mi)
- Time zone: UTC+07:00

Đốc Binh Kiều is a commune in Đồng Tháp province, Vietnam. It is one of 102 communes and wards in the province following the 2025 reorganization.

== Geography ==
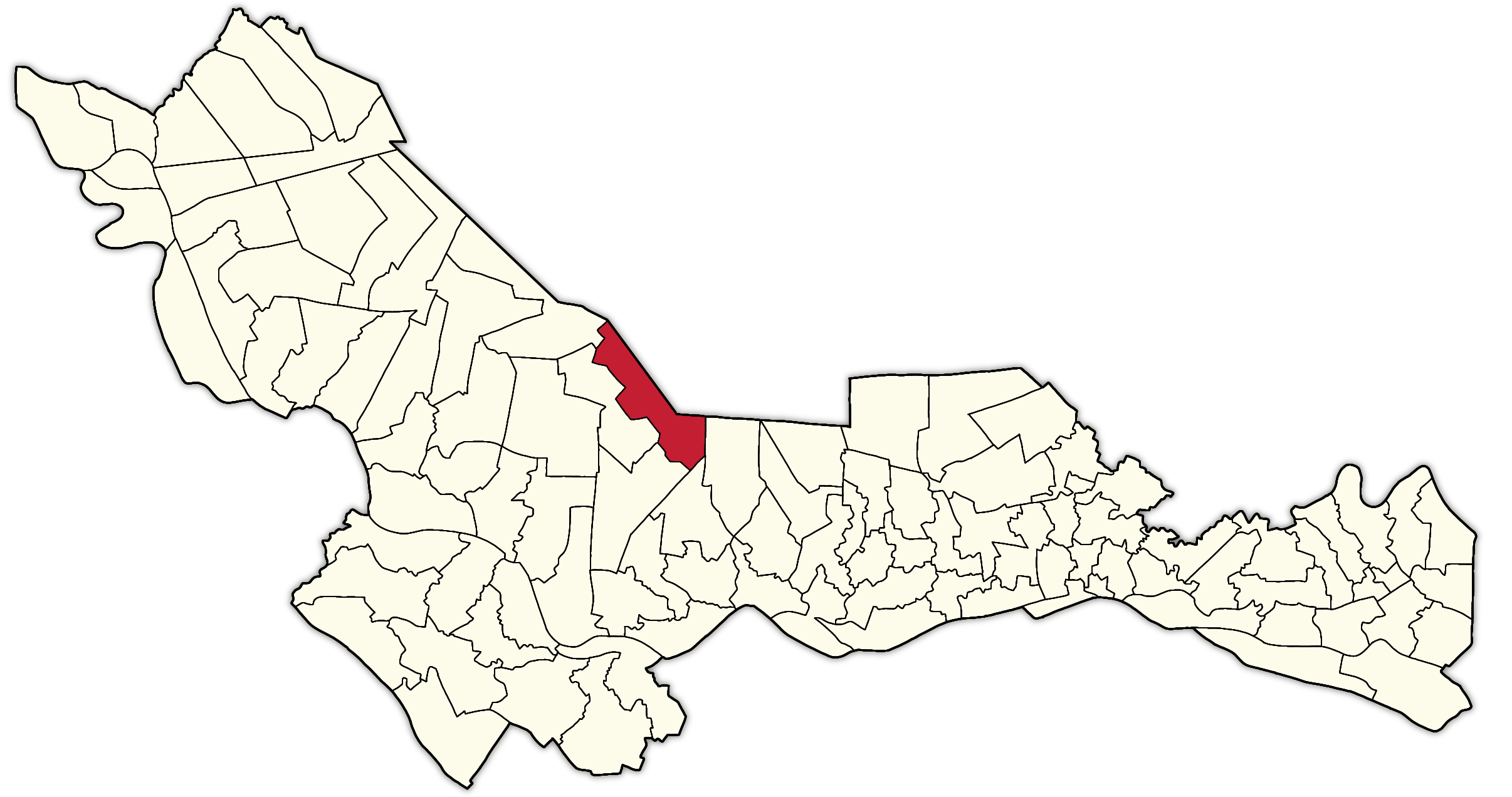
Location of Đốc Binh Kiều commune on Đồng Tháp province map (highlight in red).

Đốc Binh Kiều commune has the following geographical location:

- To the west, it borders Tháp Mười ward and Trường Xuân commune.
- To the south, it borders Thanh Mỹ commune and Mỹ Thiện commune.
- To the east, it borders Hậu Mỹ commune.
- To the northeast and north, it borders Tây Ninh province.

== History ==
Prior to 2025, Đốc Binh Kiều commune was formerly Tân Kiều and Đốc Binh Kiều communes in Tháp Mười district, Đồng Tháp province.

On June 12, 2025, the National Assembly of Vietnam issued Resolution No. 202/2025/QH15 on the reorganization of provincial-level administrative units. Accordingly:

- Đồng Tháp province was established by merging the entire area and population of Đồng Tháp province and Tiền Giang province.

On June 16, 2025, the Standing Committee of the National Assembly of Vietnam issued Resolution No. 1663/NQ-UBTVQH15 on the reorganization of commune-level administrative units in Đồng Tháp province. Accordingly:

- Đốc Binh Kiều commune was established by merging the entire area and population of the former communes of Đốc Binh Kiều and Tân Kiều (formerly part of Tháp Mười district).
