= Ba Sao =

- Commune
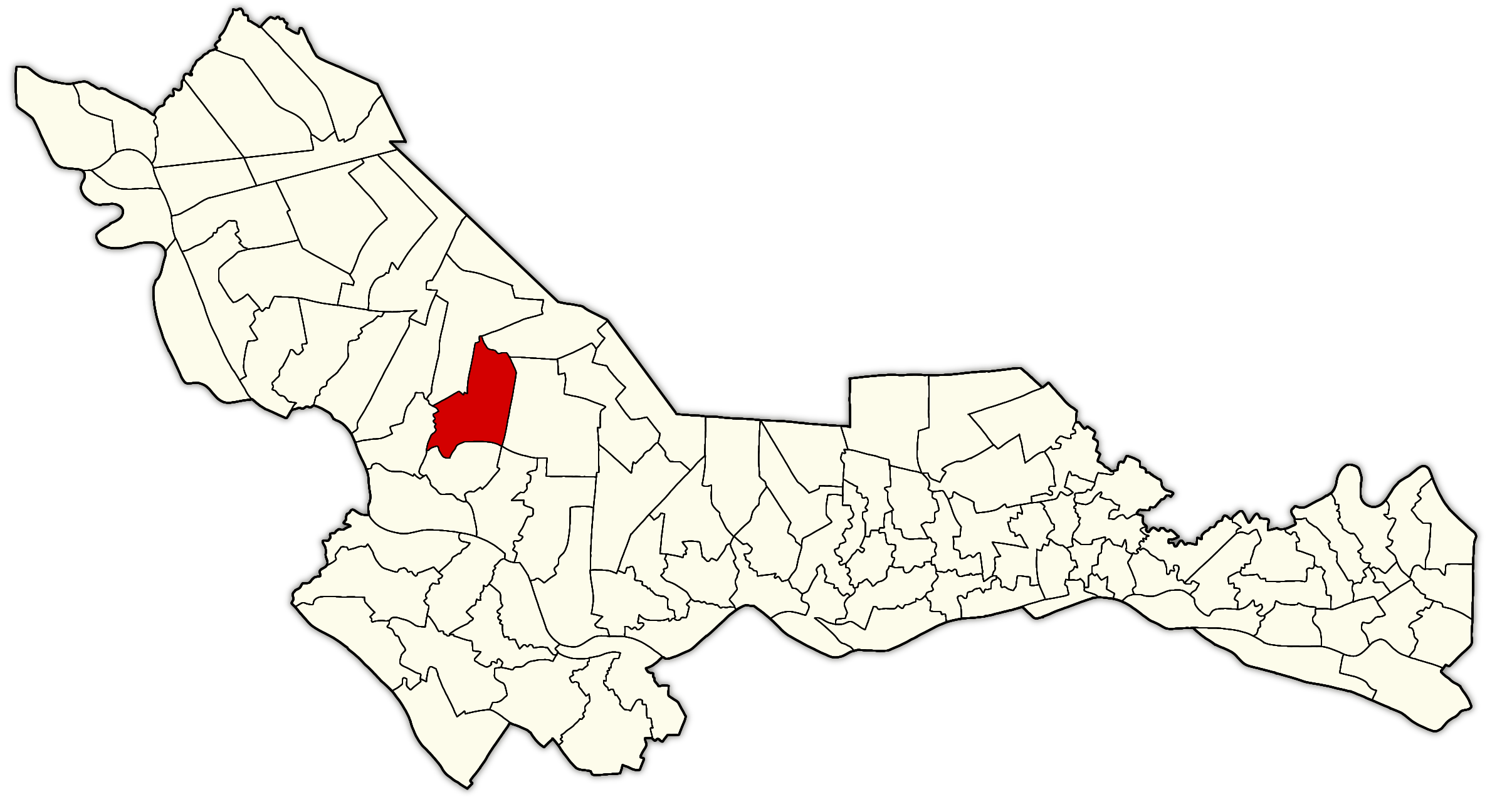
- Location of Ba Sao commune on the map of Đồng Tháp province (highlighted in red).
- Interactive map of Ba Sao
- Country: Vietnam
- Province: Đồng Tháp
- Establish: June 16, 2025

Area
  - Total: 81.13 km^{2} (31.32 sq mi)

Population
  - Total: 28,463 people
  - Density: 350.8/km^{2} (908.7/sq mi)

Ba Sao is a commune in Đồng Tháp province, Vietnam. It is one of 102 communes and wards in the province after the 2025 reorganization.

== Geography ==
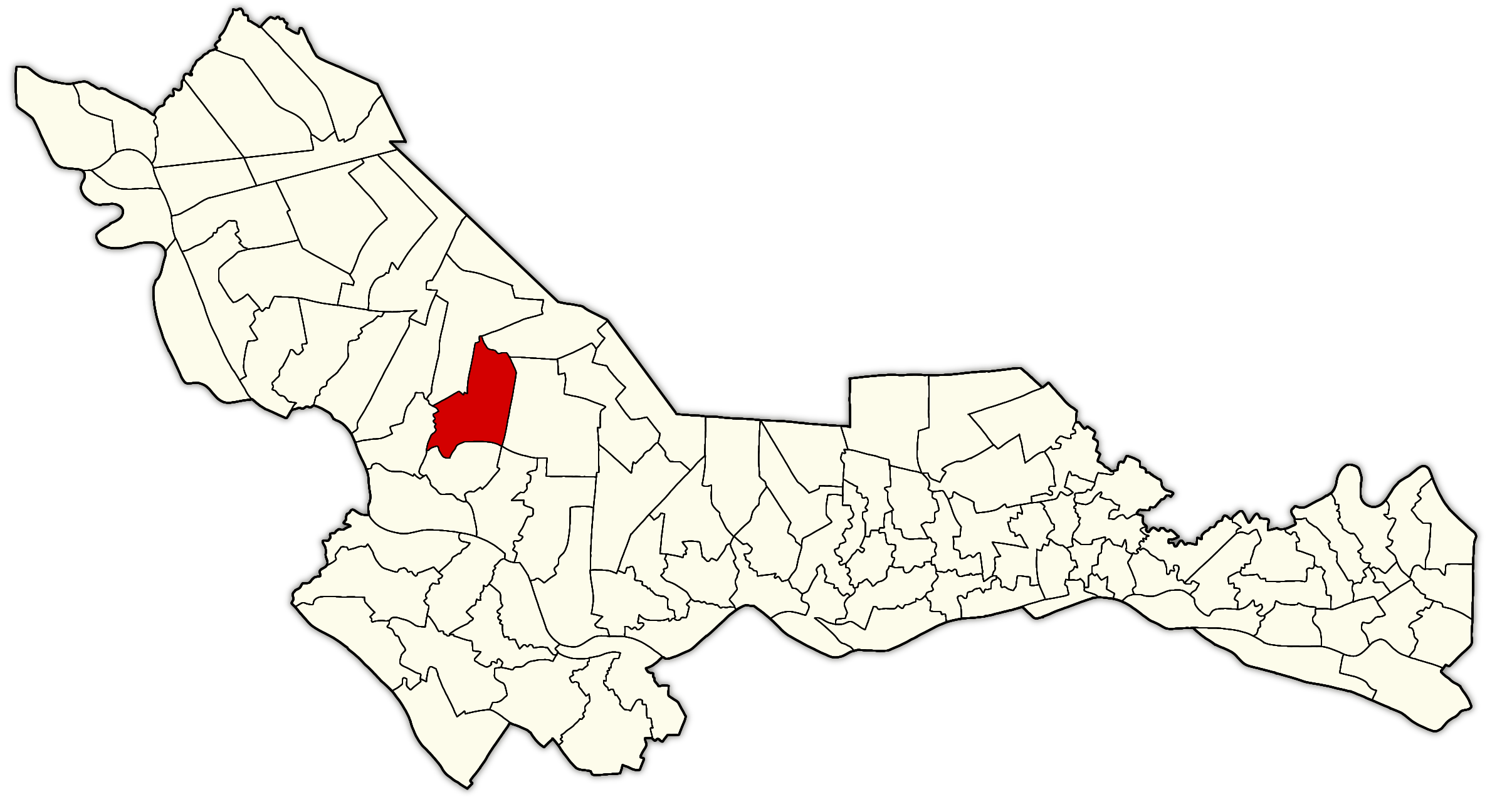
Location of Ba Sao commune in Đồng Tháp province map (highlight in red).

Ba Sao commune has the following geographical location:

- To the north, it borders Trường Xuân commune.
- To the east, it borders Mỹ Quí commune.
- To the south, it borders Mỹ Trà ward.
- To the west, it borders Mỹ Ngãi ward and Phương Thịnh commune.

== History ==
Prior to 2025, Ba Sao commune was formerly Ba Sao and Phương Trà communes in Cao Lãnh district, Đồng Tháp province.

On June 12, 2025, the National Assembly of Vietnam issued Resolution No. 202/2025/QH15 on the reorganization of provincial-level administrative units. Accordingly:

- Đồng Tháp province was established by merging the entire area and population of Đồng Tháp province and Tiền Giang province.

On June 16, 2025, the Standing Committee of the National Assembly of Vietnam issued Resolution No. 1663/NQ-UBTVQH15 on the reorganization of commune-level administrative units in Đồng Tháp province. Accordingly:

- Ba Sao commune was established by merging the entire area and population of Ba Sao commune and Phương Trà commune (formerly part of Cao Lãnh district).
