= Phú Cường =

- Commune
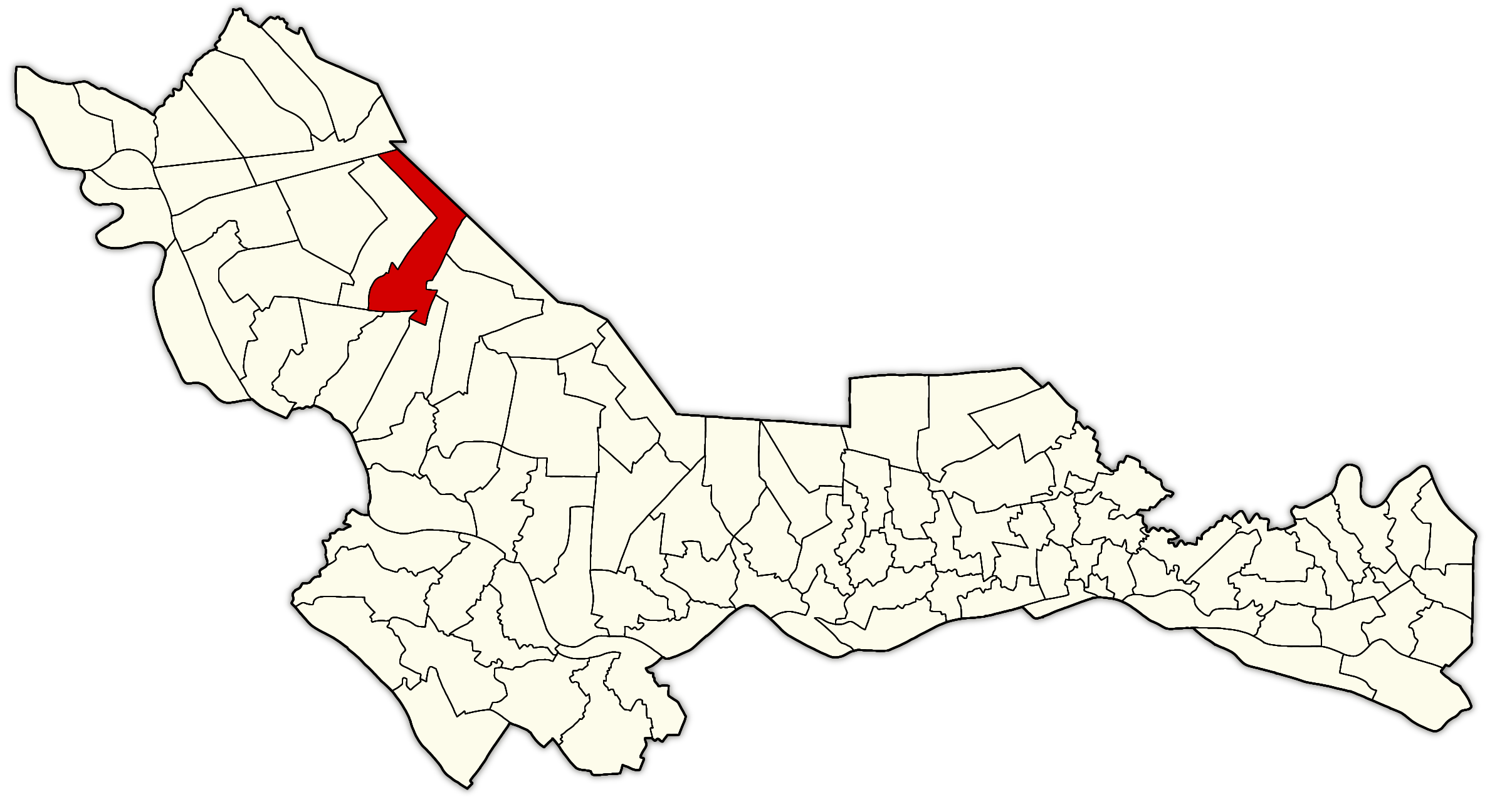
- Location of Phú Cường commune on Đồng Tháp province map (highlight in red)
- Country: Vietnam
- Province: Đồng Tháp
- Establish: June 16, 2025

Area
  - Total: 89.91 km^{2} (34.71 sq mi)

Population (2025)
  - Total: 21,122 people
  - Density: 234.9/km^{2} (608.4/sq mi)
- Time zone: UTC+07:00

Phú Cường is a commune in Đồng Tháp province, Vietnam. It is one of 102 communes and wards in the province following the 2025 reorganization.

== Geography ==
Phú Cường commune has the following geographical location:

- To the east, it borders Phương Thịnh commune, Trường Xuân commune and Tây Ninh province.
- To the south, it borders Bình Thành commune, Phong Mỹ commune, and Thanh Bình commune.
- To the west, it borders Tràm Chim commune.
- To the north, it borders An Phước commune.

== History ==
Prior to 2025, Phú Cường commune comprised Phú Cường and Hòa Bình communes (belonging to Tam Nông district) and a part of Gáo Giồng commune (belonging to Cao Lãnh district), all belonging to Đồng Tháp province.

On June 12, 2025, the National Assembly of Vietnam issued Resolution No. 202/2025/QH15 on the reorganization of provincial-level administrative units. Accordingly:

- Đồng Tháp province was established by merging the entire area and population of Đồng Tháp province and Tiền Giang province.

On June 16, 2025, the Standing Committee of the National Assembly of Vietnam issued Resolution No. 1663/NQ-UBTVQH15 on the reorganization of commune-level administrative units in Đồng Tháp province. Accordingly:

- Phú Cường commune was established by merging the entire area and population of Phú Cường commune, Hòa Bình commune (formerly part of Tam Nông district), and a part of Gáo Giồng commune (formerly part of Cao Lãnh district).
