= Mỹ Hiệp =

- Commune
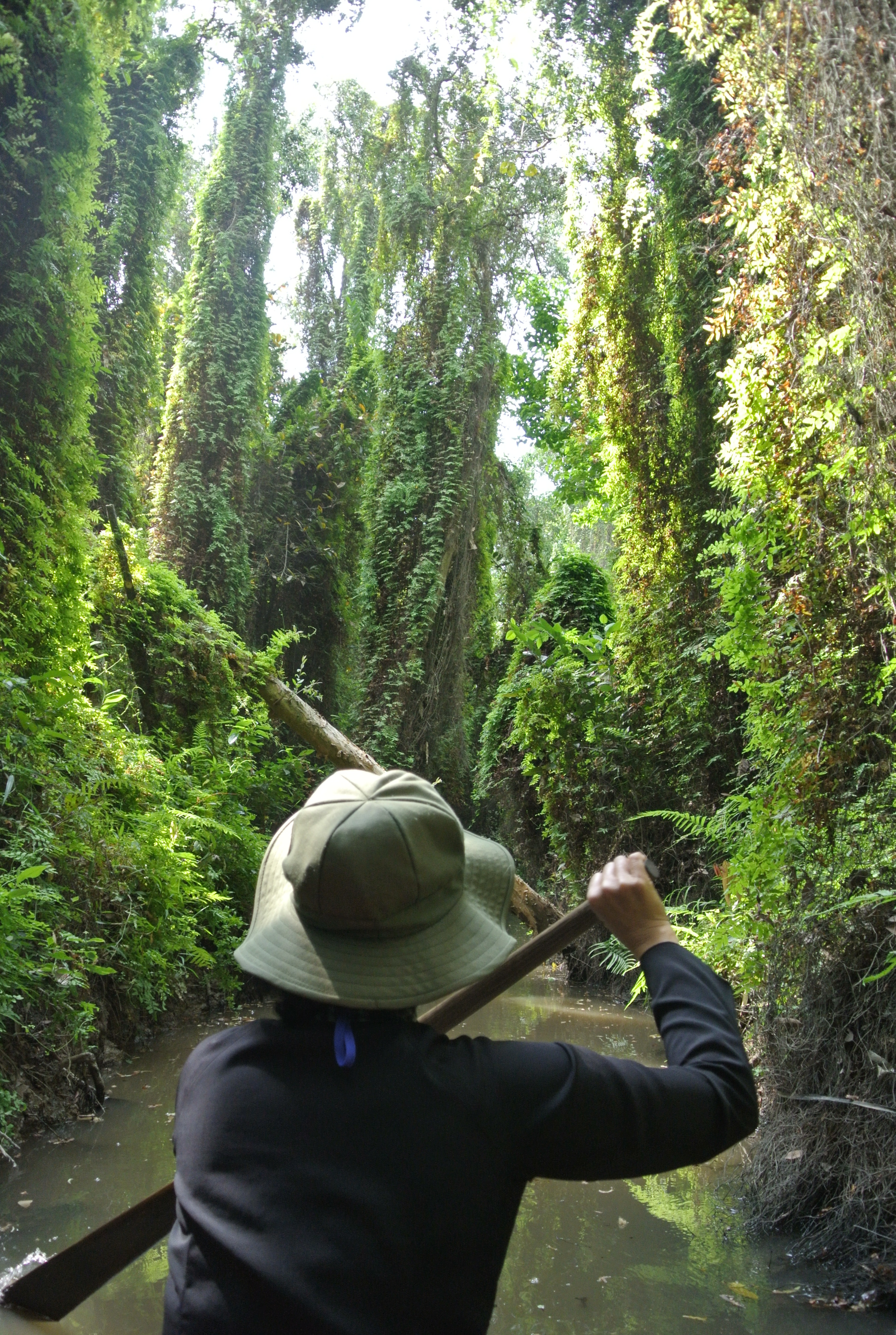
- Xẻo Quýt Historical Site
- Country: Vietnam
- Province: Đồng Tháp

Area
  - Total: 79.42 km^{2} (30.66 sq mi)

Population
  - Total: 54,577 people
  - Density: 687.2/km^{2} (1,780/sq mi)
- Time zone: UTC+07:00

Mỹ Hiệp is a commune in Đồng Tháp province, Vietnam. It is one of 102 communes and wards in the province following the 2025 reorganization.

== Geography ==
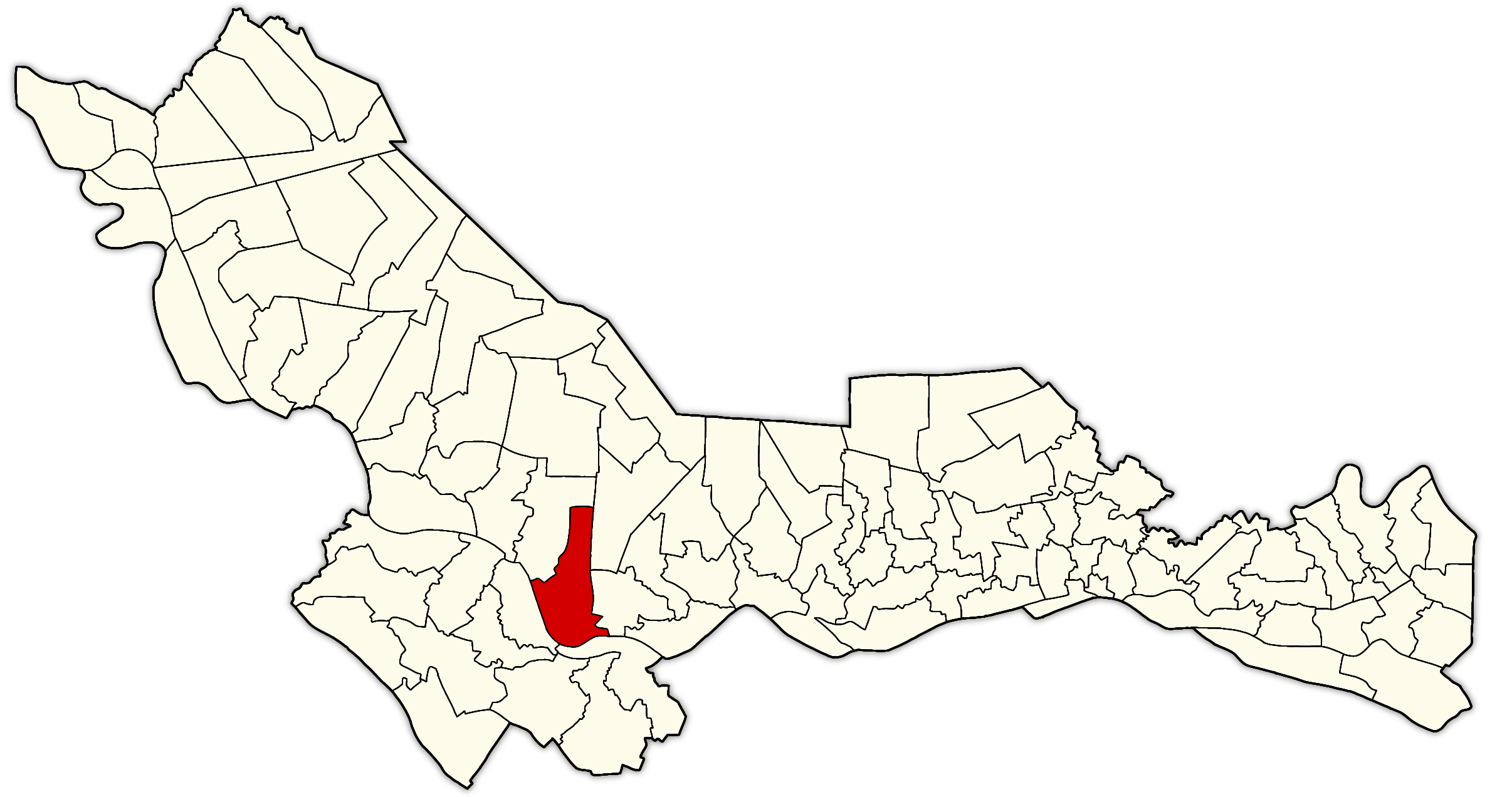
Location of Mỹ Hiệp commune on Đồng Tháp province map (highlight in red).

Mỹ Hiệp commune has a geographical location:

- To the east, it borders Thanh Hưng commune and Thanh Mỹ commune.
- To the south, it borders Phú Hựu commune.
- To the west, it borders Sa Đéc ward.
- To the northwest and north, it borders Bình Hàng Trung commune.

== History ==
Prior to 2025, the current Mỹ Hiệp commune was formerly Bình Thạnh, Mỹ Hiệp, and Mỹ Long communes in Cao Lãnh district, Đồng Tháp province.

On June 12, 2025, the National Assembly of Vietnam issued Resolution No. 202/2025/QH15 on the reorganization of provincial-level administrative units. Accordingly:

- Đồng Tháp province was established by merging the entire area and population of Đồng Tháp province and Tiền Giang province.

On June 16, 2025, the Standing Committee of the National Assembly of Vietnam issued Resolution No. 1663/NQ-UBTVQH15 on the reorganization of commune-level administrative units in Đồng Tháp province. Accordingly:

- Mỹ Hiệp commune was established by merging the entire area and population of Bình Thạnh commune, Mỹ Hiệp commune, and Mỹ Long commune (formerly part of Cao Lãnh district).
