= Phong Mỹ =

- Commune
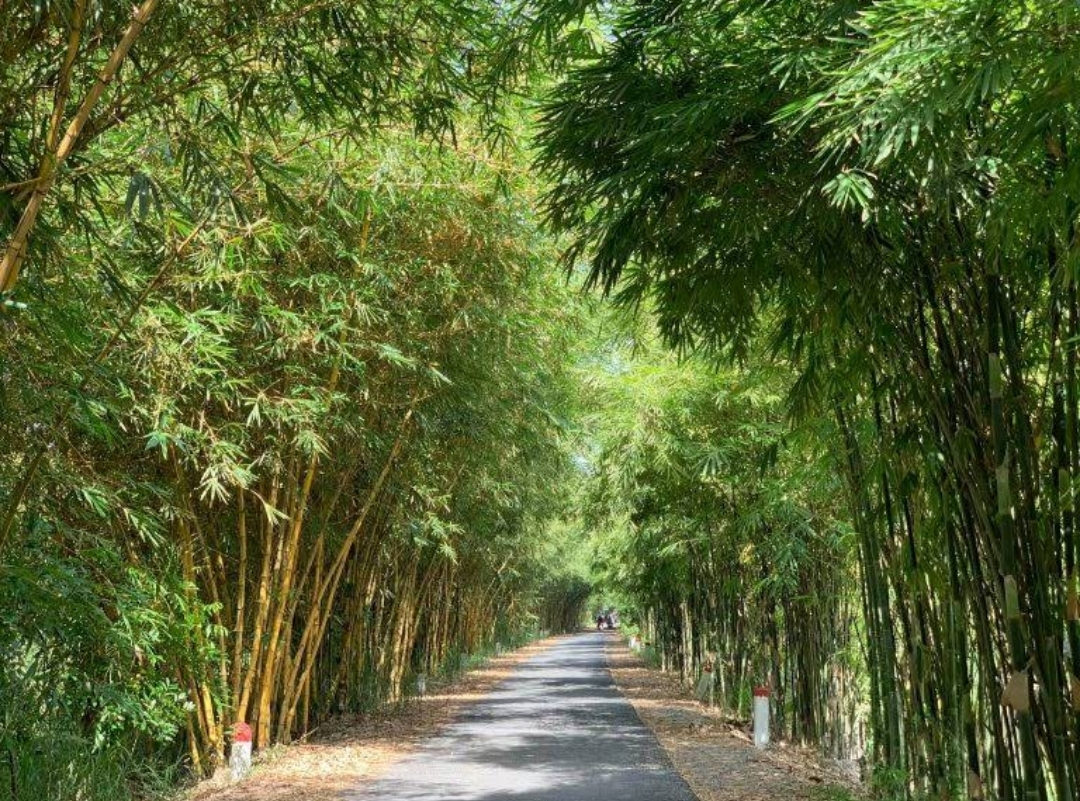
- Country: Vietnam
- Province: Đồng Tháp
- Establish: June 16, 2025

Area
  - Total: 78.58 km^{2} (30.34 sq mi)

Population
  - Total: 31,182 people
  - Density: 396.8/km^{2} (1,028/sq mi)
- Time zone: UTC+07:00

Phong Mỹ is a commune in Đồng Tháp province, Vietnam. It is one of 102 communes and wards in the province following the 2025 reorganization.

== Geography ==
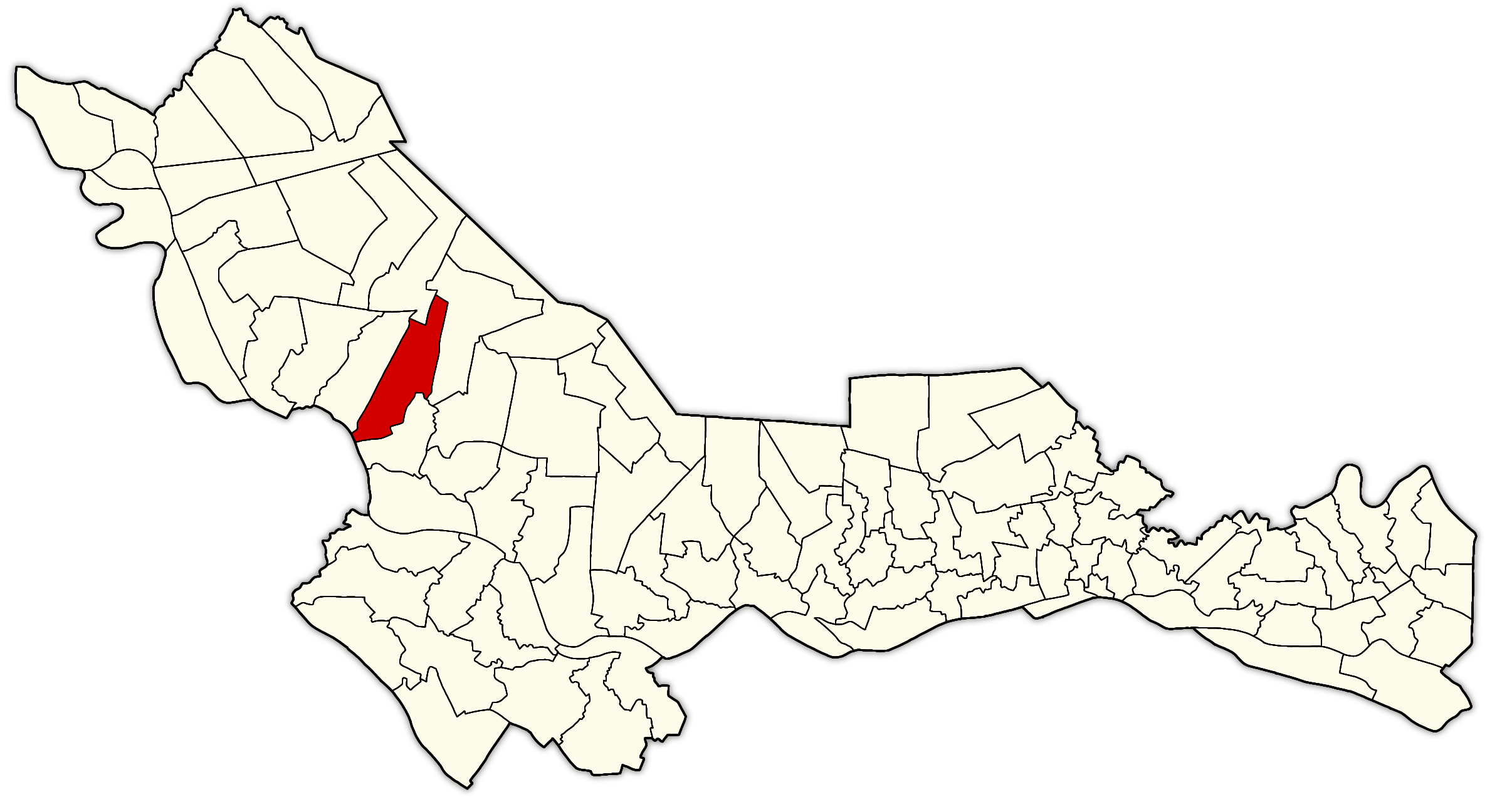
Location of Phong Mỹ commune on Đồng Tháp province map (highlight in red).

Phong Mỹ is a commune in Đồng Tháp province, located approximately 110km northwest of Mỹ Tho ward. The commune has a geographical location:

- To the south, it borders Mỹ Ngãi ward.
- To the east, it borders Phương Thịnh commune.
- To the north, it borders Phú Cường commune.
- To the west, it borders Bình Thành commune and An Giang province.

== History ==
Prior to 2025, Phong Mỹ commune was formerly Phong Mỹ commune and part of Gáo Giồng commune in Cao Lãnh district, Đồng Tháp province.

On June 12, 2025, the National Assembly of Vietnam issued Resolution No. 202/2025/QH15 on the reorganization of provincial-level administrative units. Accordingly:

- Đồng Tháp province was established by merging the entire area and population of Đồng Tháp province and Tiền Giang province.

On June 16, 2025, the Standing Committee of the National Assembly of Vietnam issued Resolution No. 1663/NQ-UBTVQH15 on the reorganization of commune-level administrative units in Đồng Tháp province. Accordingly:

- Phong Mỹ commune was established by merging the entire area and population of the Phong Mỹ commune and part of Gáo Giồng commune (formerly part of Cao Lãnh district).
