= Bình Hàng Trung =

- Commune
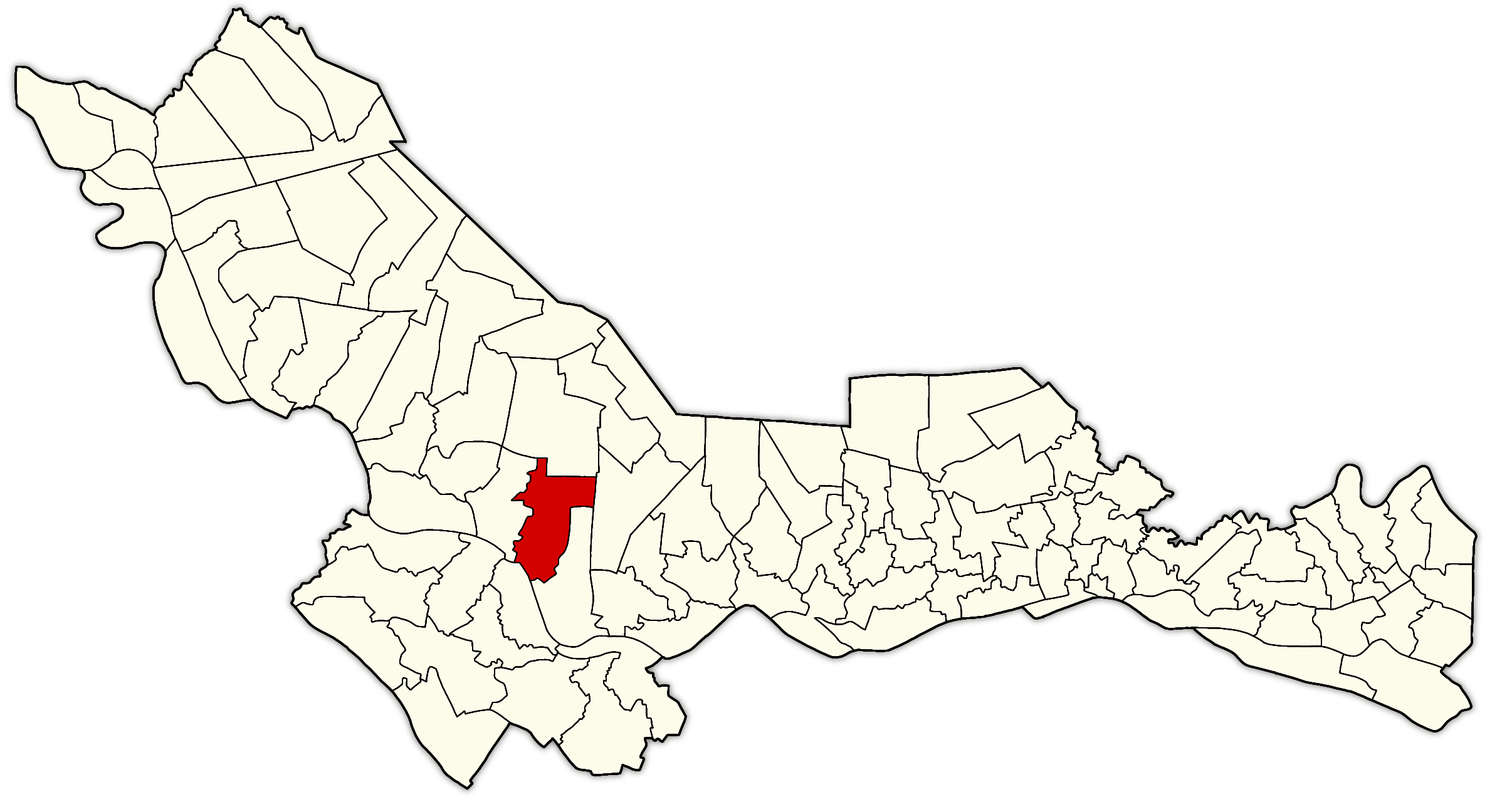
- Location of Bình Hàng Trung commune on Đồng Tháp province map (highlight in red).
- Interactive map of Bình Hàng Trung
- Coordinates: 10°22′52″N 105°44′46″E
- Country: Vietnam
- Province: Đồng Tháp
- Establish: June 16, 2025

Area
  - Total: 78.22 km^{2} (30.20 sq mi)

Population
  - Total: 39,533 people
  - Density: 505.4/km^{2} (1,309/sq mi)
- Time zone: UTC+07:00

Bình Hàng Trung is a commune in Đồng Tháp province, Vietnam. It is one of 102 communes and wards in the province following the 2025 reorganization.

== Geography ==
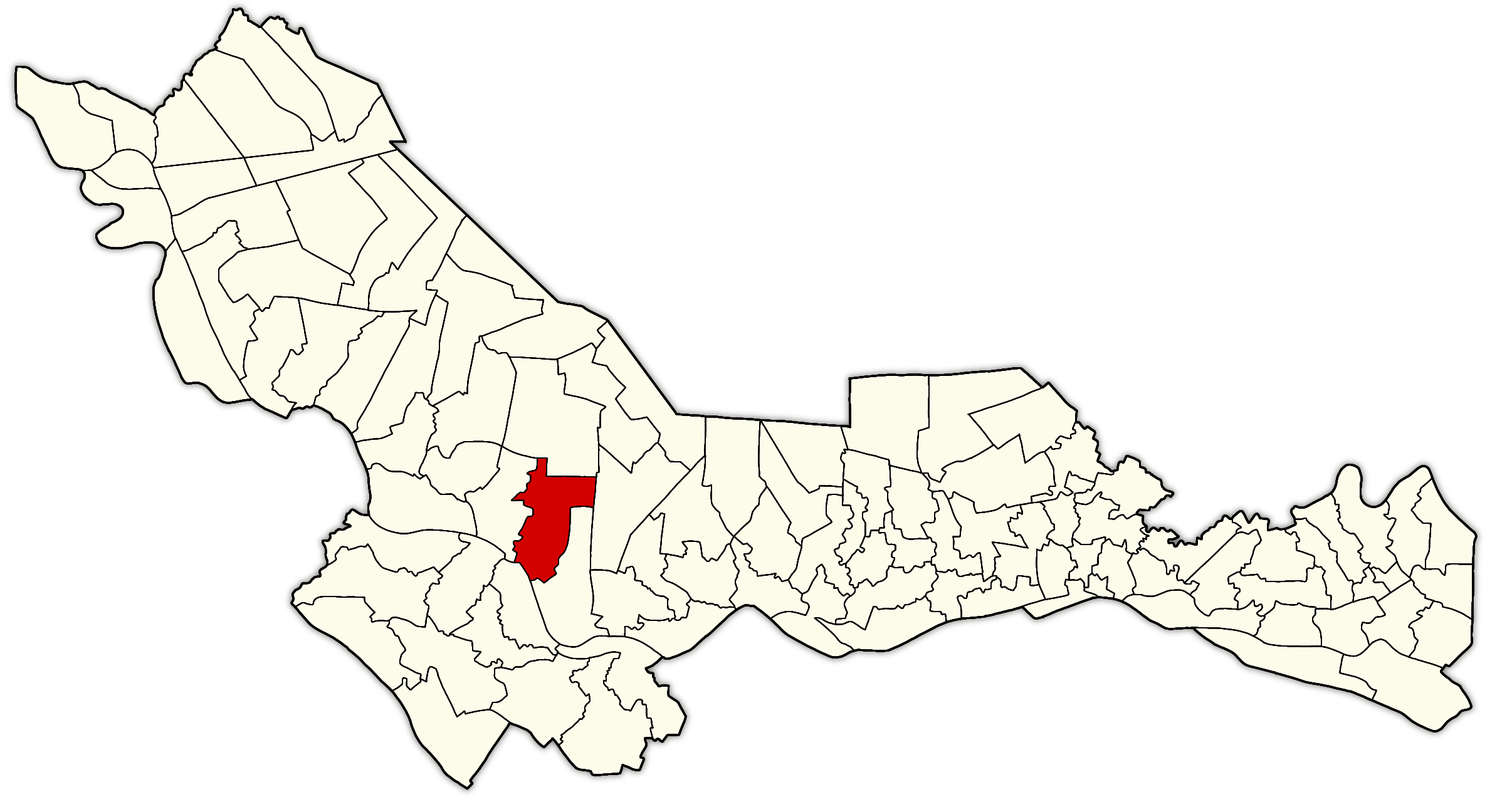
Location of Bình Hàng Trung commune on Đồng Tháp province map (highlight in red).

Bình Hàng Trung commune has the following geographical location:

- To the north, it borders Mỹ Quí commune.
- To the east, it borders Thanh Mỹ commune.
- To the southeast, it borders Mỹ Hiệp commune.
- To the south it borders Sa Đéc ward.
- To the west, it borders Mỹ Thọ ward.

== History ==
Prior to 2025, the current Bình Hàng Trung commune was formerly Bình Hàng Tây commune, Bình Hàng Trung commune, and Tân Hội Trung commune, belonging to Cao Lãnh district, Đồng Tháp province.

On June 12, 2025, the National Assembly of Vietnam issued Resolution No. 202/2025/QH15 on the reorganization of provincial-level administrative units. Accordingly:

- Đồng Tháp province was established by merging the entire area and population of Đồng Tháp province and Tiền Giang province.

On June 16, 2025, the Standing Committee of the National Assembly of Vietnam issued Resolution No. 1663/NQ-UBTVQH15 on the reorganization of commune-level administrative units in Đồng Tháp province. Accordingly:

- The commune of Bình Hàng Trung was established by merging the entire area and population of the communes of Bình Hàng Tây, Bình Hàng Trung, and Tân Hội Trung (formerly part of Cao Lãnh district).
