= Mỹ Ngãi =

- Ward
- Interactive map of Mỹ Ngãi
- Country: Vietnam
- Region: Mekong Delta
- Province: Đồng Tháp
- Establish: November 24, 2024
- Merger: June 16, 2026

Area
  - Total: 49 km^{2} (19 sq mi)

Population
  - Total: 50,504 people
  - Density: 1,000/km^{2} (2,700/sq mi)
- Time zone: UTC+07:00

Mỹ Ngãi is a ward in Đồng Tháp province, Vietnam. It is one of 102 wards and communes in the province.

== Geography ==
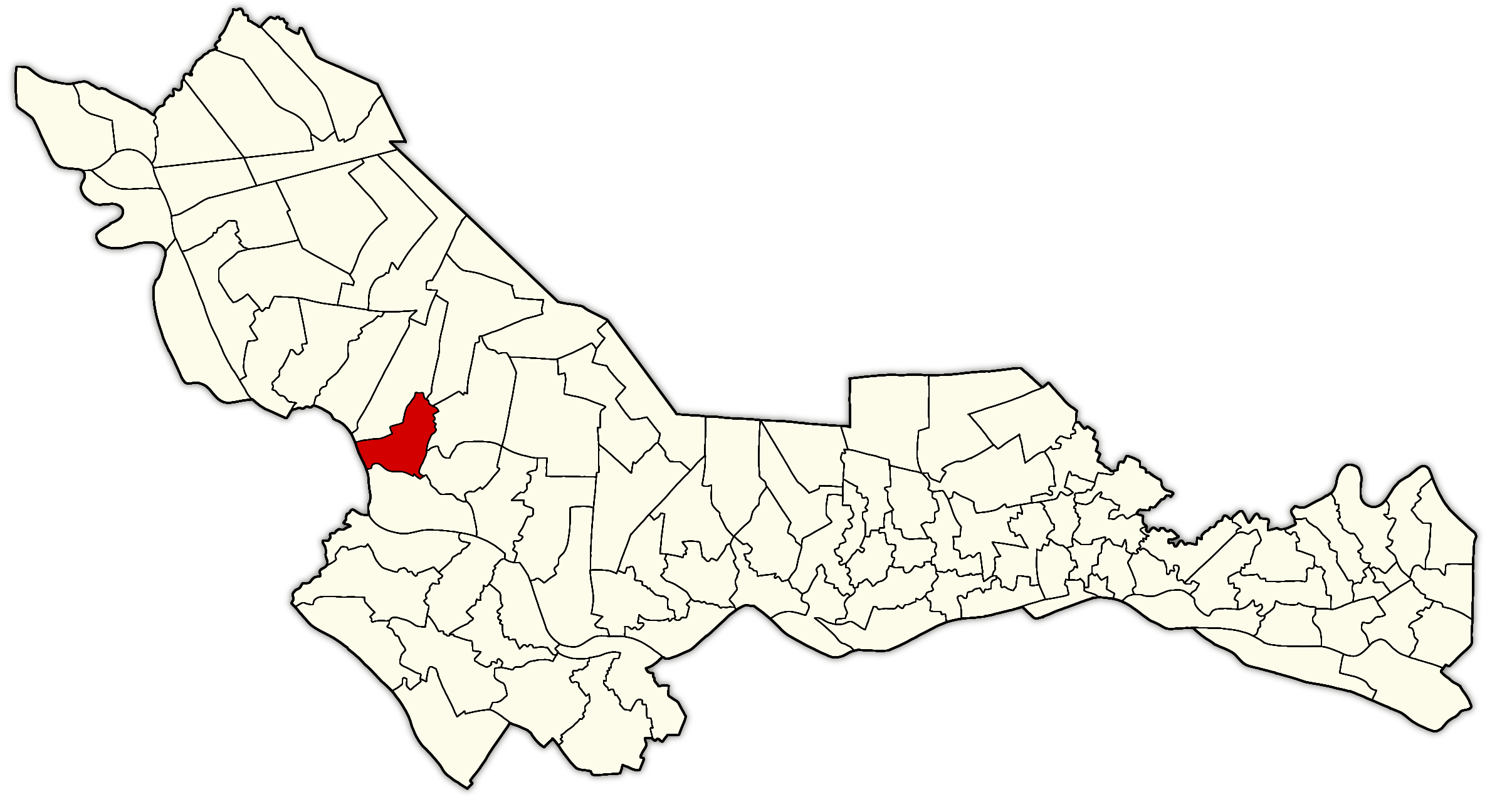
Location of Mỹ Ngãi ward on the map of Đồng Tháp province (highlighted in red).

- To the east, it borders Mỹ Trà ward and Ba Sao commune.
- To the west, it borders Cù Lao Giêng commune, An Giang province, with the Tiền river as the boundary.
- To the south, it borders Cao Lãnh ward.
- To the north, it borders Phong Mỹ commune and Phương Thịnh commune.

== History ==
Before 2024, Mỹ Ngãi was a commune belonging to Cao Lãnh city, Đồng Tháp province.

On November 24, 2024, Mỹ Ngãi ward was established by merging the entire area and population of Mỹ Ngãi commune and ward 11 in Cao Lãnh city, Đồng Tháp province.

On June 12, 2025, the National Assembly of Vietnam issued Resolution No. 202/2025/QH15 on the reorganization of provincial-level administrative units. Accordingly:

- The Đồng Tháp province was established by merging the entire area and population of Đồng Tháp province and Tiền Giang province.

June 16, 2025, the Standing Committee of the National Assembly of Vietnam issued Resolution No. 1663/NQ-UBTVQH15 on the rearrangement of commune-level administrative units in Đồng Tháp province, accordingly:

- The Mỹ Ngãi ward was established by merging the entire area and population of Mỹ Ngãi ward and Mỹ Tân commune in Cao Lãnh city, and Tân Nghĩa commune in Cao Lãnh district.
