= Mỹ Trà =

- Ward
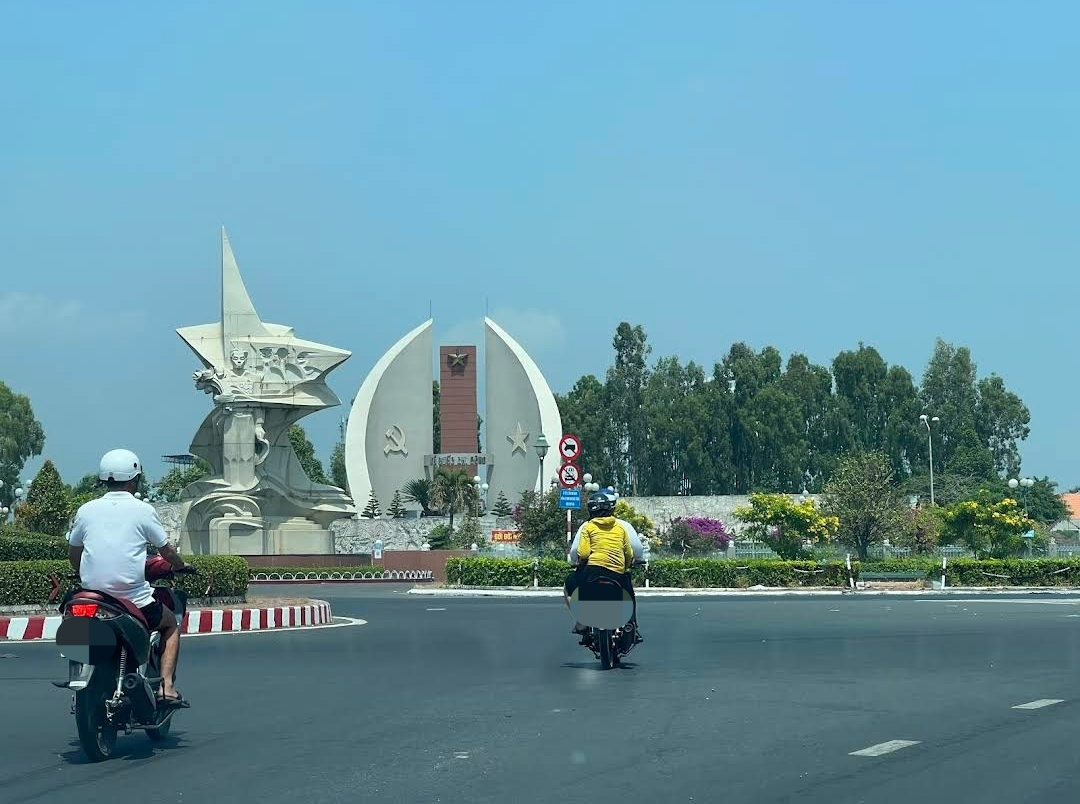
- Interactive map of Mỹ Trà
- Coordinates: 10°28′30″N 105°40′15″E
- Country: Vietnam
- Region: Mekong Delta
- Province: Đồng Tháp
- Establish: June 16, 2026

Area
  - Total: 46 km^{2} (18 sq mi)

Population (2024)
  - Total: 46,757 people
  - Density: 1,000/km^{2} (2,600/sq mi)

Mỹ Trà is a ward in Đồng Tháp province, Vietnam. It is one of 102 wards and communes in the province.

== Geography ==
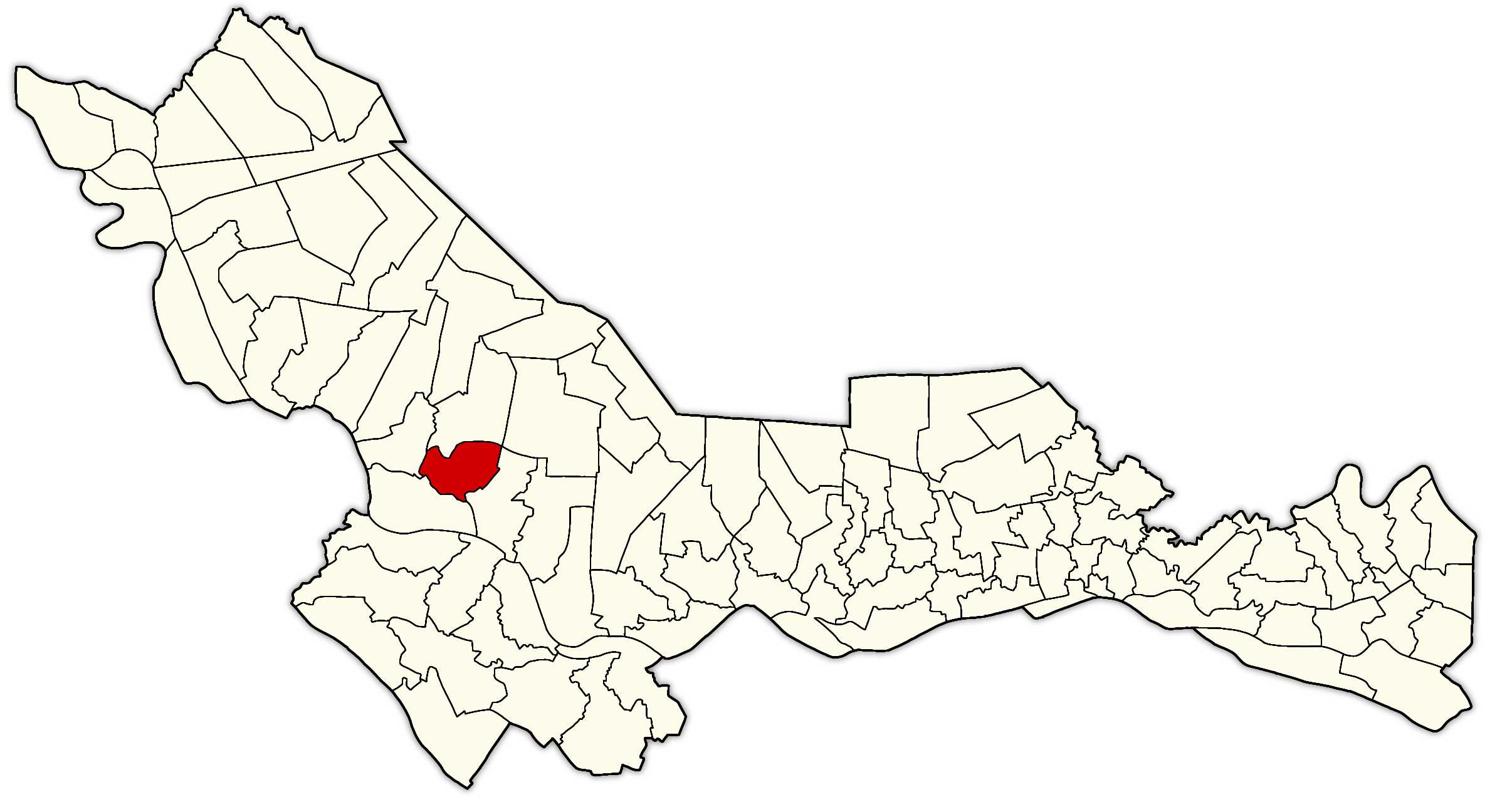
The map shows the location of Mỹ Trà ward in Đồng Tháp province (highlighted in red).

Mỹ Trà is a ward in Đồng Tháp province, Vietnam. It is located 100km west of Mỹ Tho ward and 30km northwest of Sa Đéc ward. The ward has the following geographical location:

- To the east, it borders Mỹ Thọ ward.
- To the west, it borders Mỹ Ngãi ward.
- To the south, it borders Cao Lãnh ward.
- To the north, it borders Ba Sao commune.

== History ==
Before 2025, Mỹ Trà ward was part of Cao Lãnh city and Cao Lãnh district, Đồng Tháp province.

On June 12, 2025, the Vietnamese National Assembly issued Resolution No. 202/2025/QH15 on the reorganization of provincial-level administrative units. Accordingly:

- The province of Đồng Tháp was established by merging the entire area and population of Đồng Tháp province and Tiền Giang province.

On June 16, 2025, the Standing Committee of the National Assembly issued Resolution No. 1663/NQ-UBTVQH15 on the rearrangement of commune-level administrative units in Đồng Tháp province in 2025. Accordingly:

- The Mỹ Trà ward was established by merging the entire area and population of Mỹ Phú ward and Mỹ Trà commune in Cao Lãnh city, and An Bình, Nhị Mỹ communes in Cao Lãnh district, Đồng Tháp province (Excerpt from Clause 97, Article 1).
