= Thanh Mỹ =

- Commune
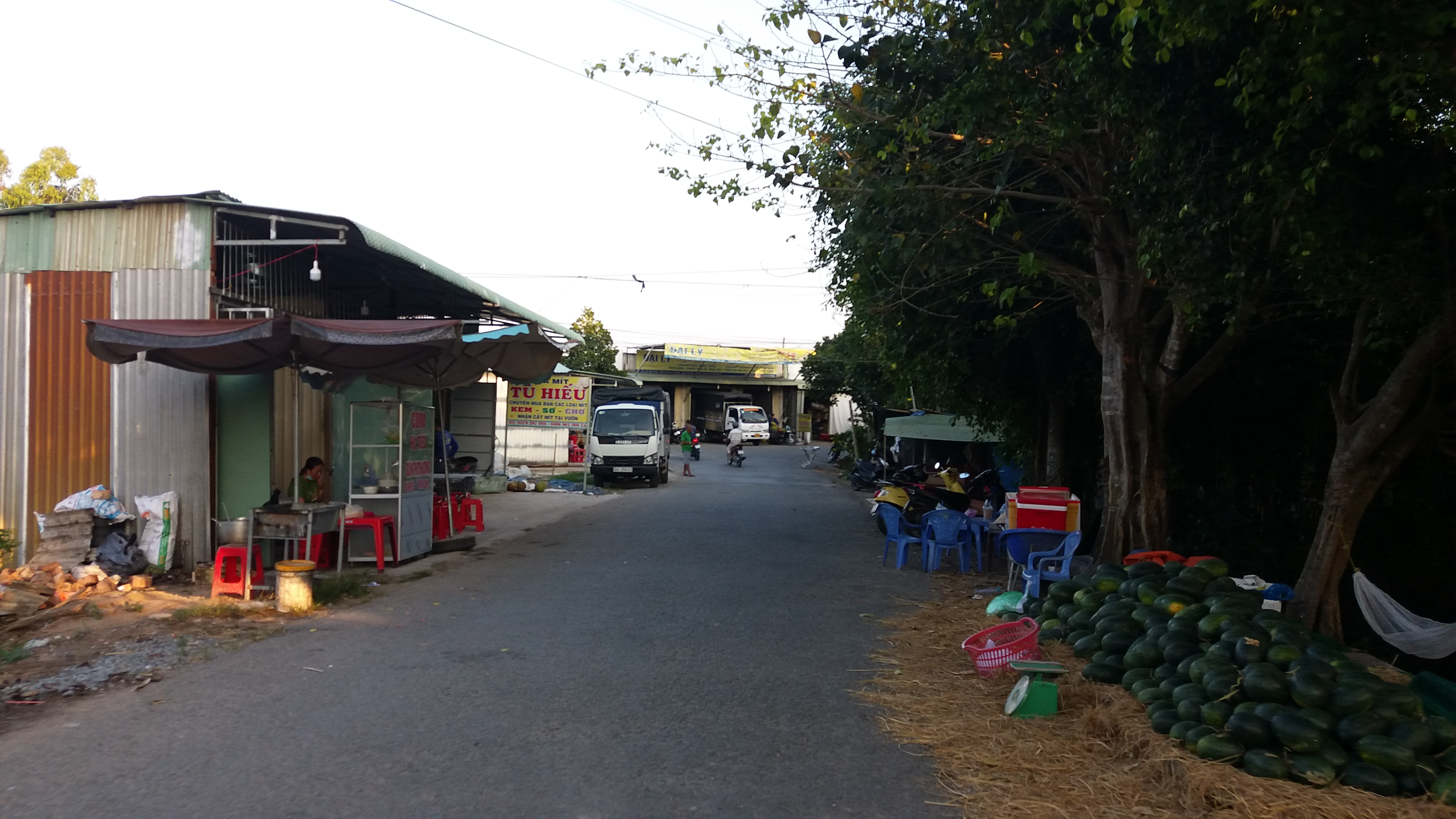
- Phú Điền market area
- Country: Vietnam
- Province: Đồng Tháp
- Establish: June 16, 2025

Area
  - Total: 93.15 km^{2} (35.97 sq mi)

Population (2025)
  - Total: 33,096 people
  - Density: 355.3/km^{2} (920.2/sq mi)
- Time zone: UTC+07:00

Thanh Mỹ is a commune in Đồng Tháp province, Vietnam. It is one of 102 communes and wards in the province following the 2025 reorganization.

== Geography ==
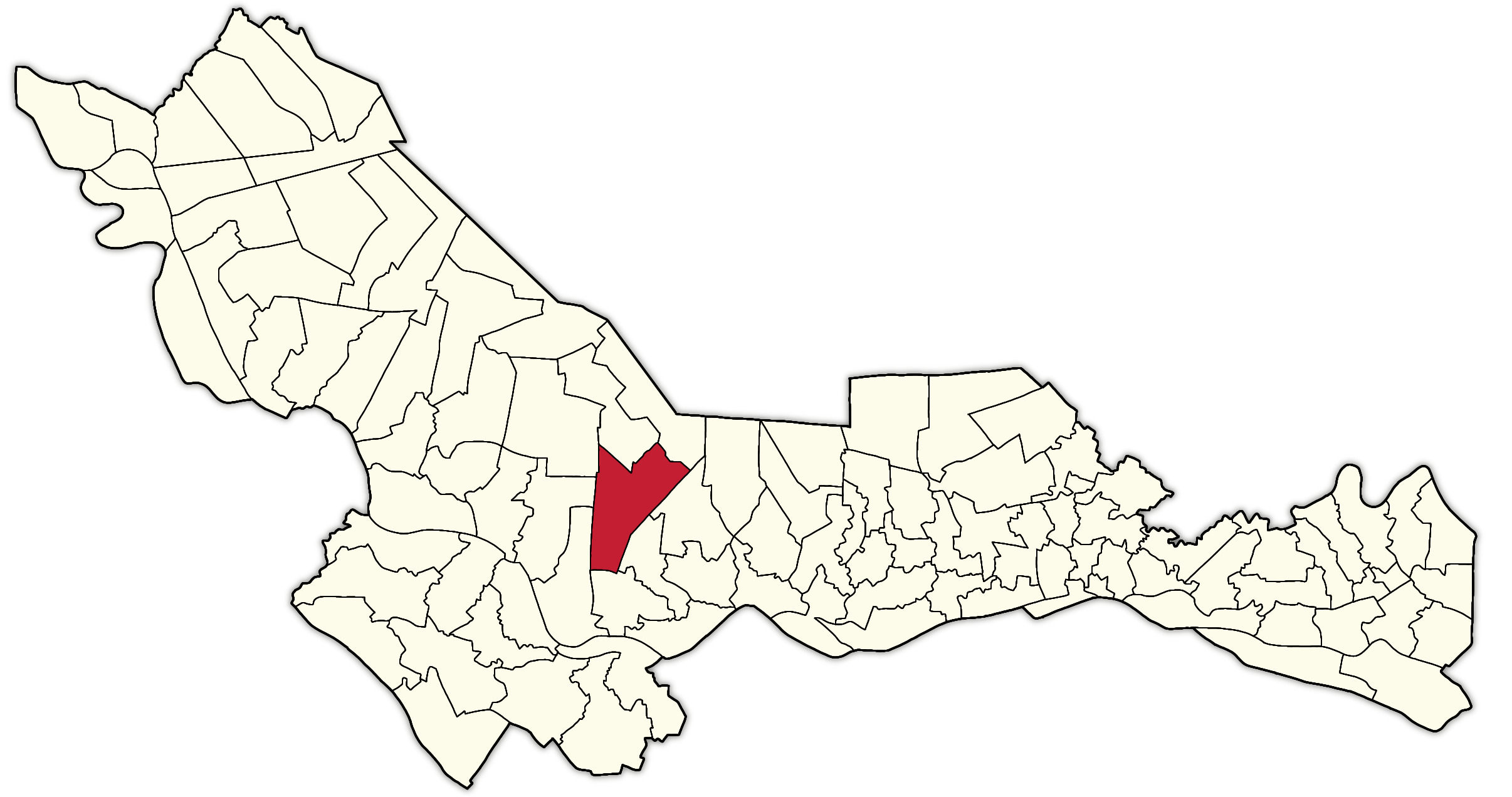
Location of Thanh Mỹ commune on Đồng Tháp province map (highlight in red).

Thanh Mỹ commune has the following geographical location:

- To the north, it borders Đốc Binh Kiều commune and Tháp Mười ward.
- To the west, it borders Mỹ Quí, Bình Hàng Trung, and Mỹ Hiệp communes.
- To the south, it borders Thanh Hưng commune.
- To the east, it borders Mỹ Thiện commune.
- To the southeast, it borders Mỹ Lợi commune.

== History ==
Prior to 2025, Thanh Mỹ commune was formerly Thanh Mỹ and Phú Điền communes in Tháp Mười district, Đồng Tháp province.

On June 12, 2025, the National Assembly of Vietnam issued Resolution No. 202/2025/QH15 on the reorganization of provincial-level administrative units. Accordingly:

- Đồng Tháp province was established by merging the entire area and population of Đồng Tháp province and Tiền Giang province.

On June 16, 2025, the Standing Committee of the National Assembly of Vietnam issued Resolution No. 1663/NQ-UBTVQH15 on the reorganization of commune-level administrative units in Đồng Tháp province. Accordingly:

- Thanh Mỹ commune was established by merging the entire area and population of Thanh Mỹ commune and Phú Điền commune (formerly Tháp Mười district).
