= Mỹ Thọ =

- Ward
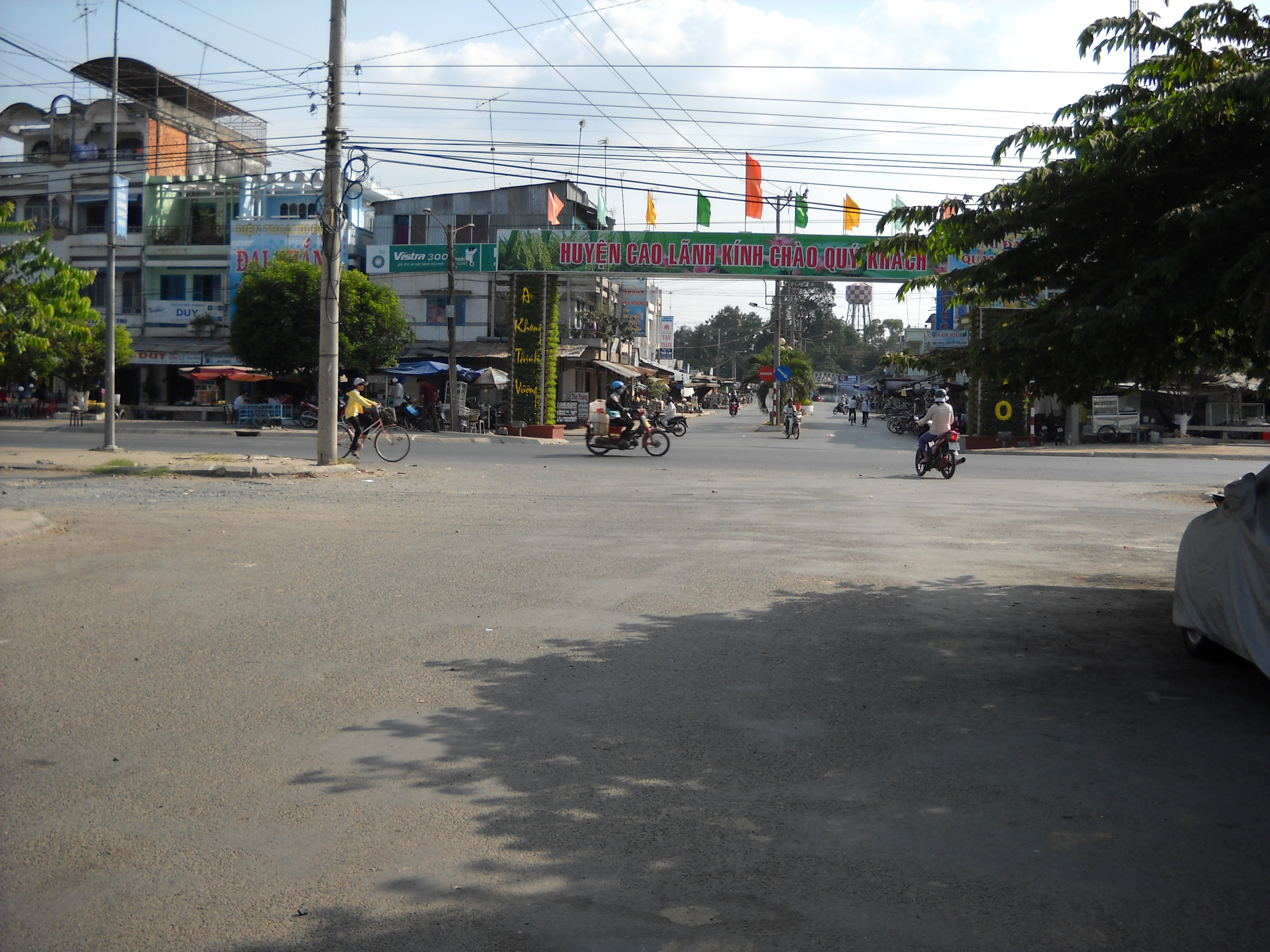
- A view of the center of Mỹ Thọ ward.

- Location within Vietnam
- Coordinates: 10°26′44″N 105°41′49″E
- Country: Vietnam
- Province: Đồng Tháp
- Establish: June 16, 2025
- Become a ward: May 11, 2026

Area
  - Total: 23.74 sq mi (61.49 km^{2})

Population (2025)
  - Total: 51,191 people
  - Density: 2,156/sq mi (832.5/km^{2})
- Time zone: UTC+7 (UTC + 7)

Mỹ Thọ is a ward in Đồng Tháp province, Vietnam. This is one of 102 communes and wards in the province.

== Geography ==
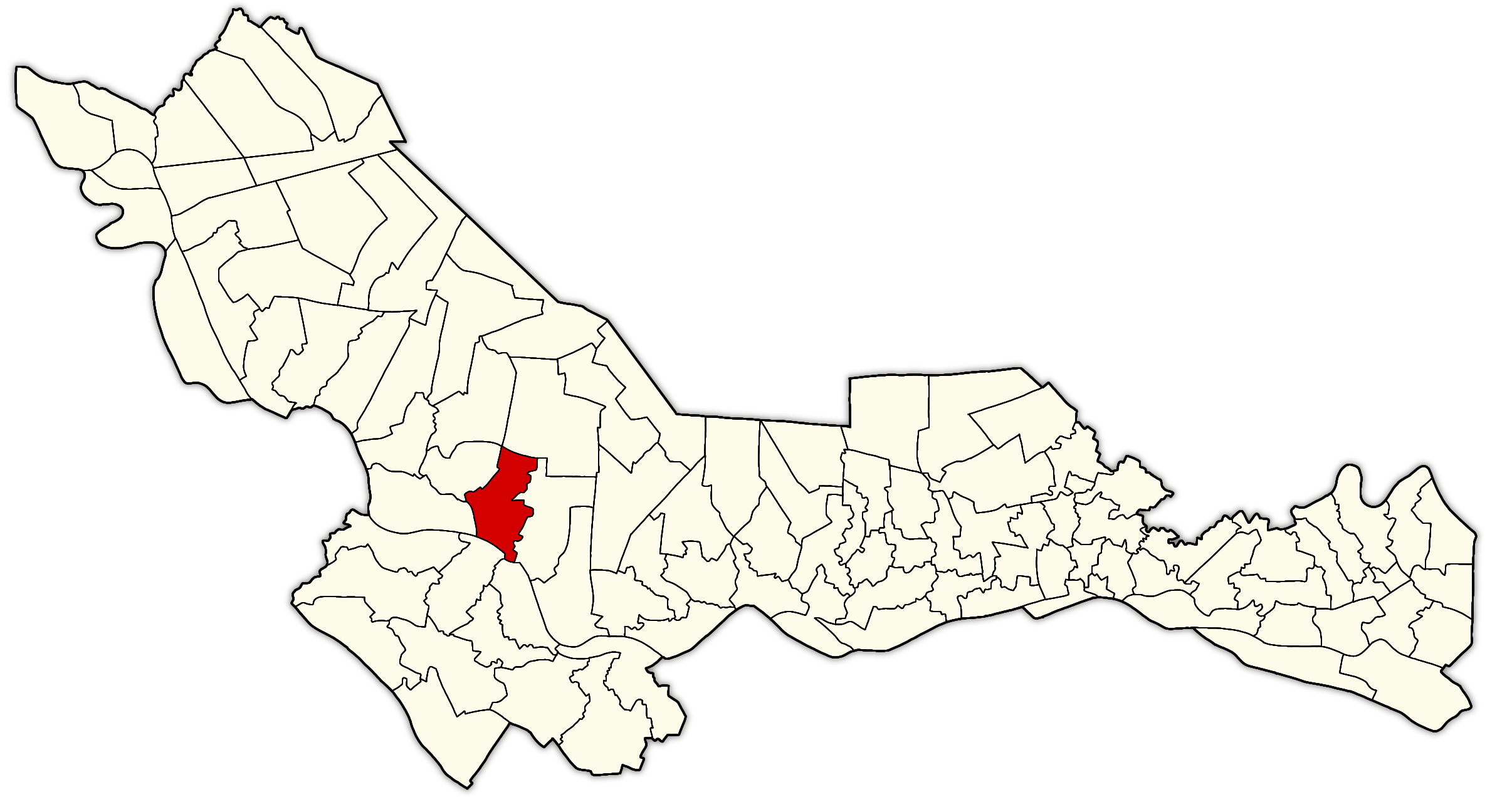
Location of Mỹ Thọ ward in Đồng Tháp province map (highlight in red).

Mỹ Thọ is a ward in Đồng Tháp province, located about 100km west of Mỹ Tho ward. The commune has a geographical location:

- To the west, it borders Cao Lãnh ward and Mỹ Trà ward.
- To the east, it borders Bình Hàng Trung commune.
- To the north, it borders Mỹ Quí commune.
- To the south, it borders Sa Đéc ward and Tân Khánh Trung commune.

== History ==
Prior to 2025, Mỹ Thọ ward was formerly Mỹ Thọ commune-level town, Mỹ Hội commune, Mỹ Xương commune, and Mỹ Thọ commune in Cao Lãnh district, Đồng Tháp province.

On June 12, 2025, the National Assembly of Vietnam issued Resolution No. 202/2025/QH15 on the reorganization of provincial-level administrative units. Accordingly:

- Đồng Tháp province was established by merging the entire area and population of Đồng Tháp province and Tiền Giang province.

On June 16, 2025, the Standing Committee of the National Assembly of Vietnam issued Resolution No. 1663/NQ-UBTVQH15 on the reorganization of commune-level administrative units in Đồng Tháp province. Accordingly:

- Mỹ Thọ commune was established by merging the entire area and population of Mỹ Thọ commune-level town, Mỹ Thọ commune, Mỹ Xương commune, and Mỹ Hội commune (formerly part of Cao Lãnh district).

On May 11, 2026, the People's Council of Đồng Tháp province approved the plan to establish 11 new wards in the province. Accordingly:

- The Mỹ Thọ ward was established based on the entire area and population of Mỹ Thọ commune.
