= Bình Thành, Đồng Tháp =

Bình Thành
- Commune
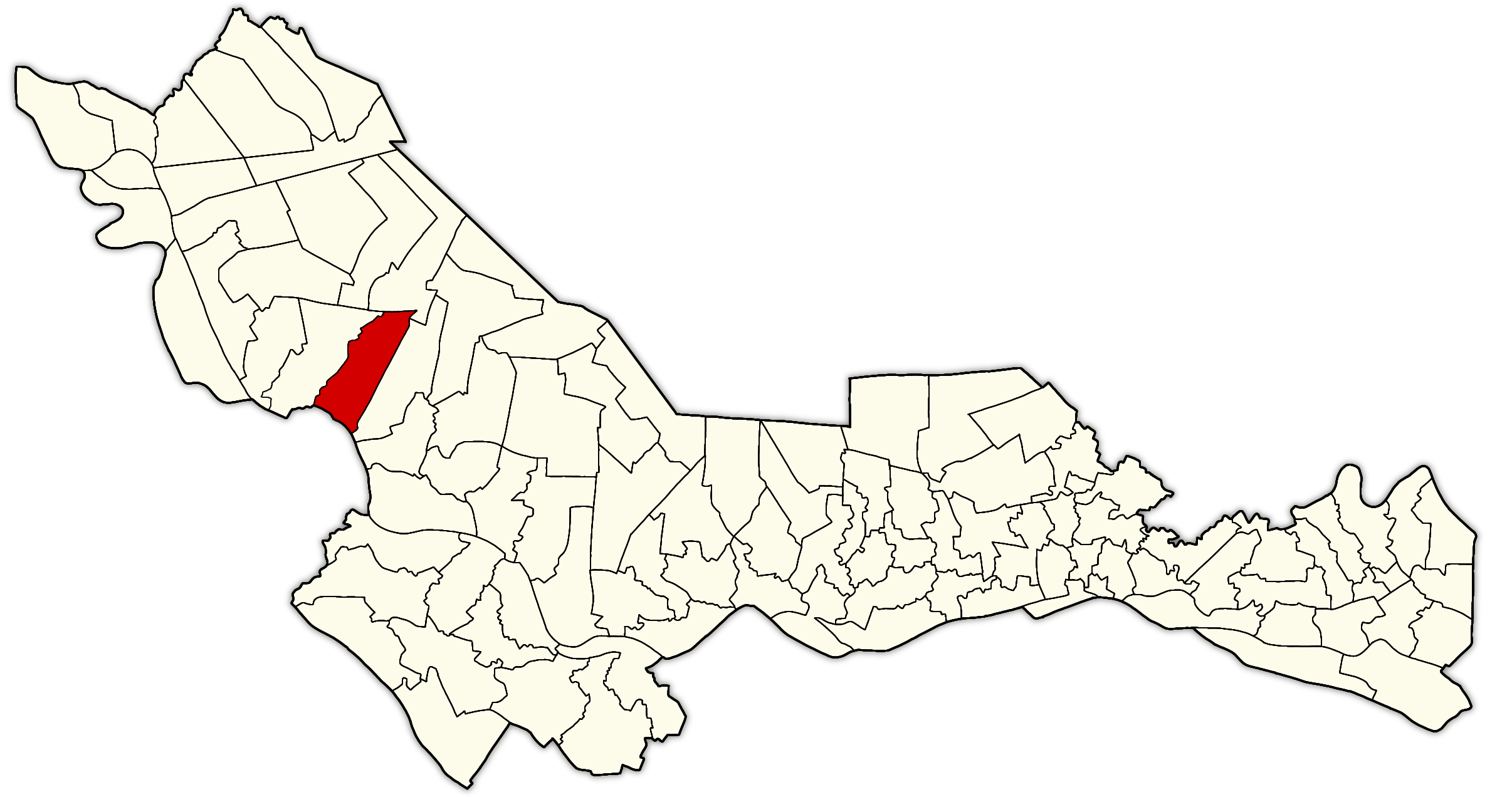
- Location of Bình Thành commune on Đồng Tháp province map (highlight in red).
- Country: Vietnam
- Province: Đồng Tháp
- Establish: June 16, 2025

Area
  - Total: 72.15 km^{2} (27.86 sq mi)

Population
  - Total: 31,182 people
  - Density: 432.2/km^{2} (1,119/sq mi)
- Time zone: UTC+07:00
- Administrative code: 30163

Bình Thành is a commune in Đồng Tháp province, Vietnam. It is one of 102 communes and wards in the province following the 2025 reorganization.

== Geography ==
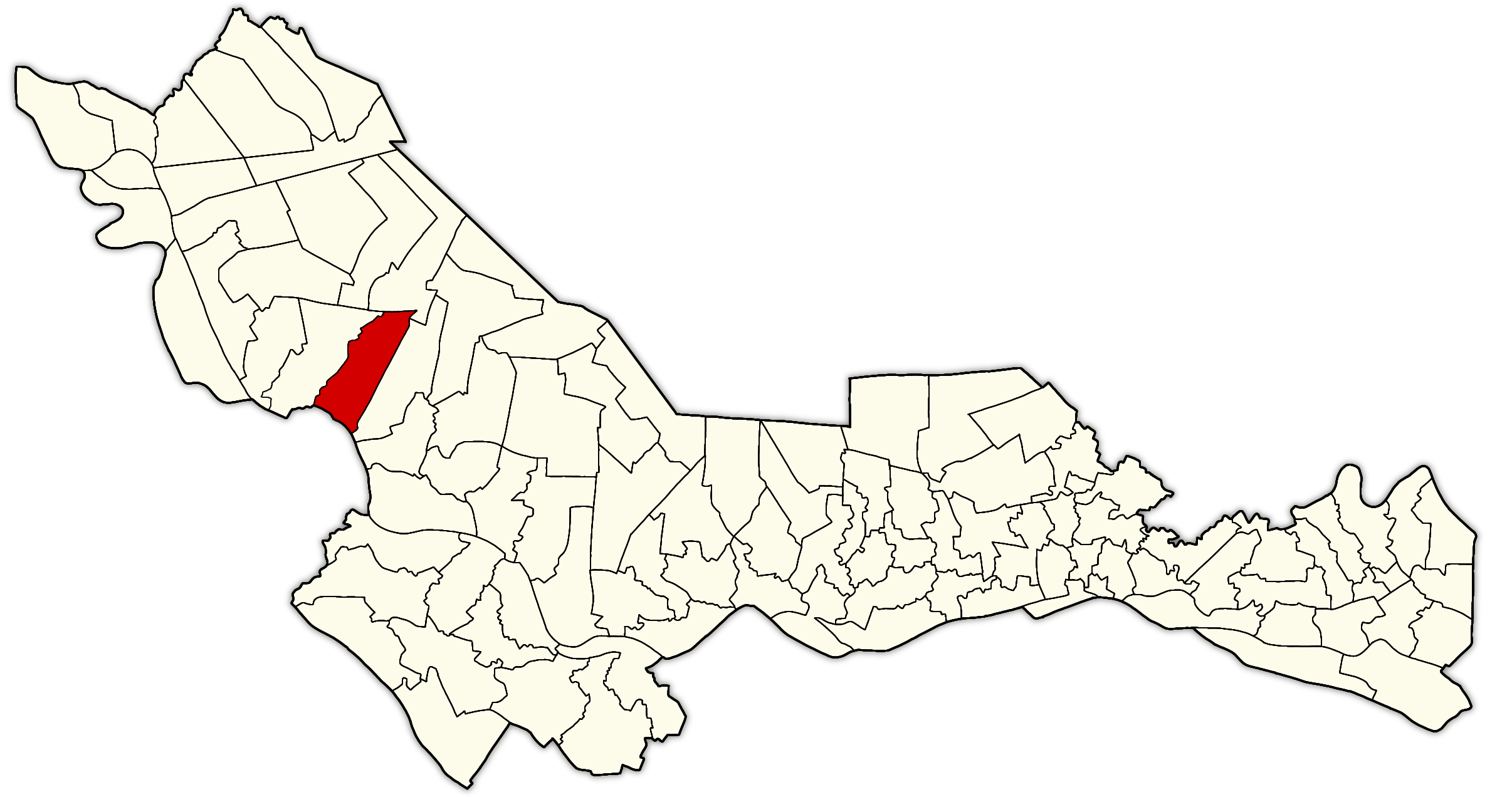
Location of Bình Thành commune on Đồng Tháp province map (highlight in red).

Bình Thành is a commune located in the northern part of Đồng Tháp province. The commune has the following geographical location:

- To the north, it borders Phú Cường commune.
- To the east, it borders Phong Mỹ commune.
- To the south, it borders An Giang province.
- To the west, it borders Thanh Bình commune.

== History ==
Prior to 2025, Bình Thành commune consisted of Bình Thành and Bình Tấn communes in Thanh Bình district, Đồng Tháp province.

On June 12, 2025, the National Assembly of Vietnam issued Resolution No. 202/2025/QH15 on the reorganization of provincial-level administrative units. Accordingly:

- Đồng Tháp province was established by merging the entire area and population of Đồng Tháp province and Tiền Giang province.

On June 16, 2025, the Standing Committee of the National Assembly of Vietnam issued Resolution No. 1663/NQ-UBTVQH15 on the reorganization of commune-level administrative units in Đồng Tháp province. Accordingly:

- Bình Thành commune was established by merging the entire area and population of Bình Thành commune and Bình Tấn commune (formerly part of Thanh Bình district).
