= Tháp Mười =

- Ward
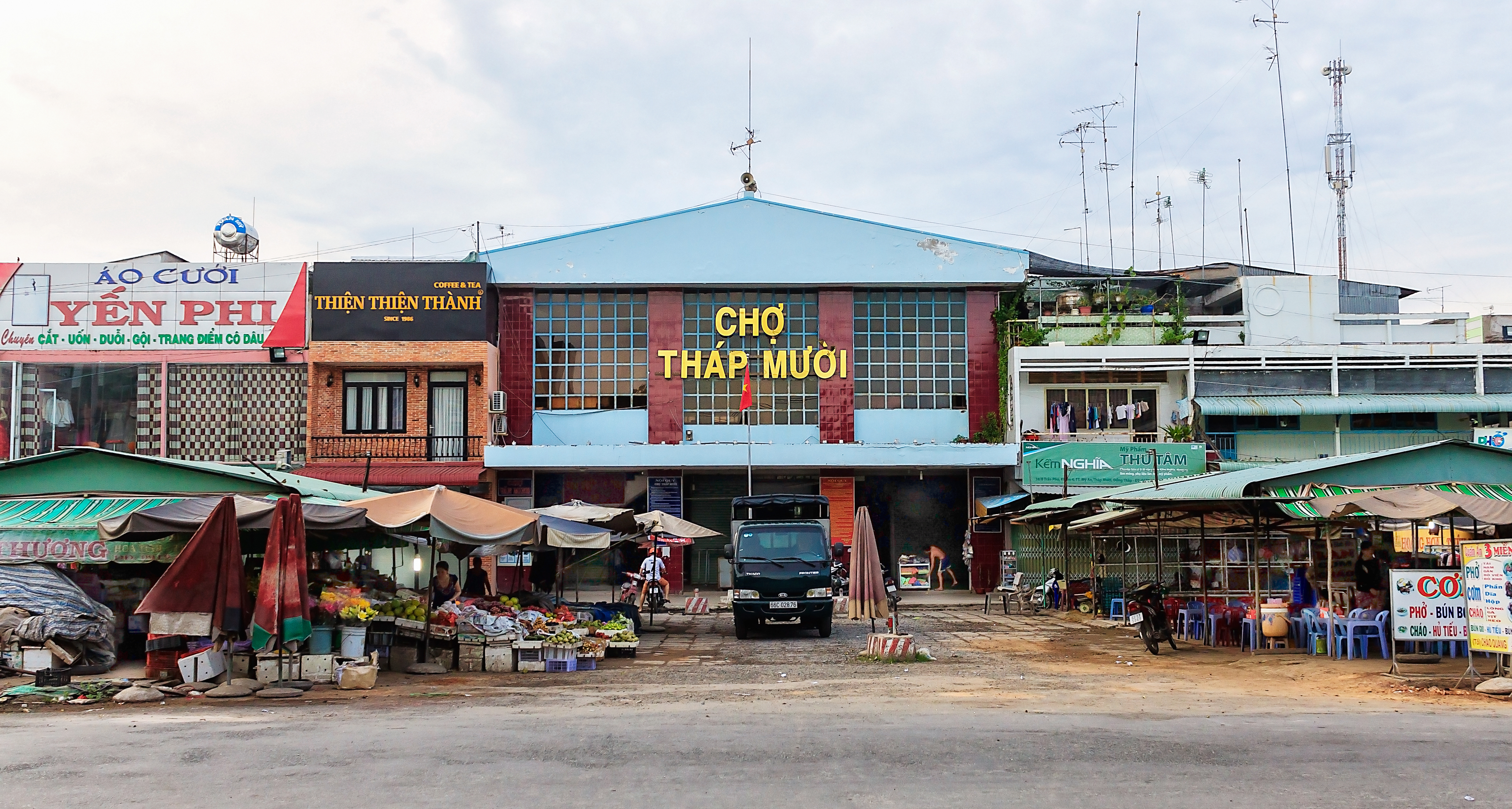
- Tháp Mười market

- Location within Vietnam
- Coordinates: 10°31′14″N 105°50′41″E
- Country: Vietnam
- Province: Đồng Tháp
- Establish: June 16, 2025
- Become a ward: May 11, 2026

Area
  - Total: 27.18 sq mi (70.40 km^{2})

Population (2025)
  - Total: 44,427 people
- Time zone: UTC+07:00

Tháp Mười is a ward in Đồng Tháp province, Vietnam. It is one of 102 communes and wards in the province.

== Geography ==
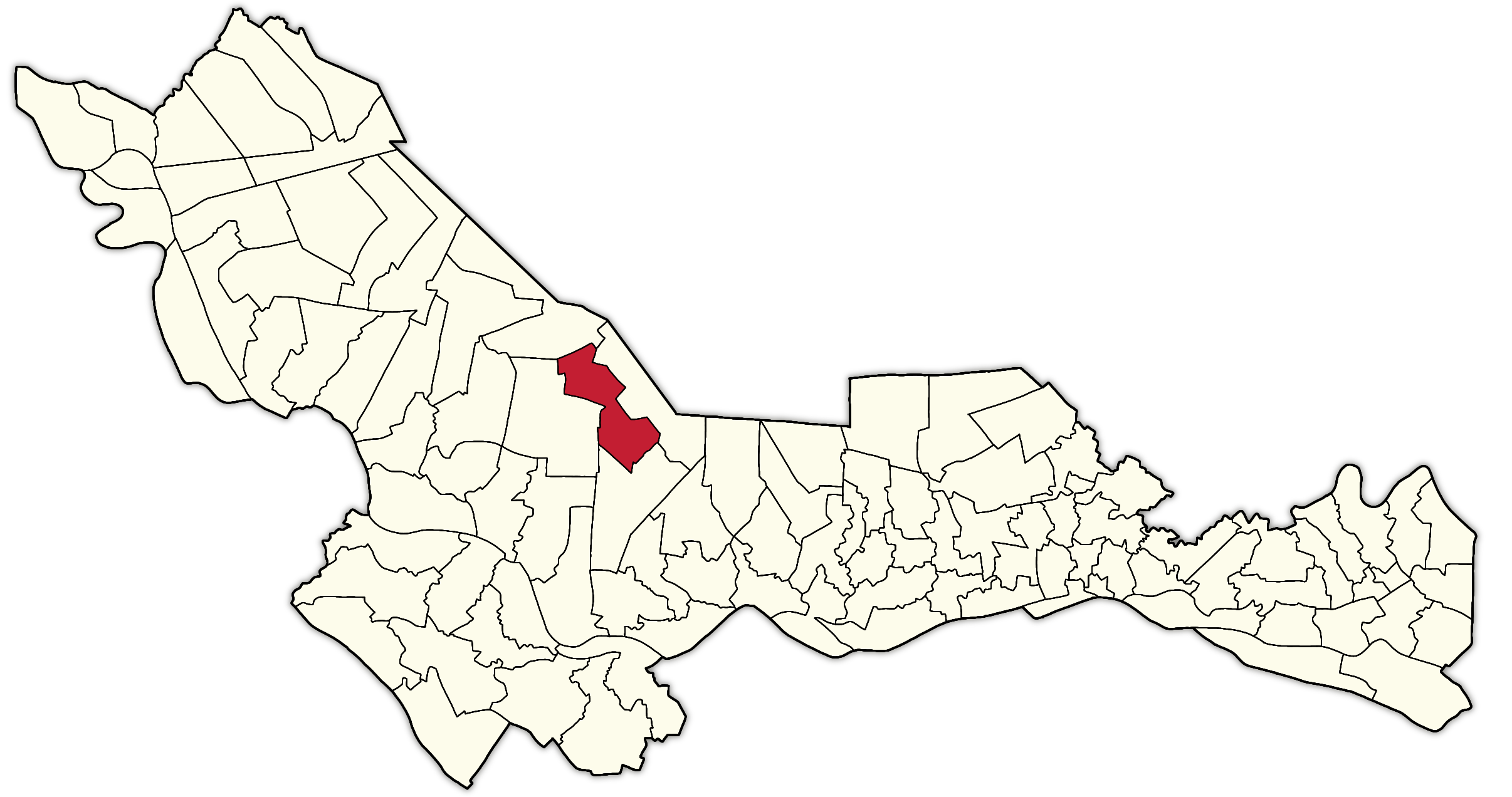
Location of Tháp Mười ward on Đồng Tháp province map (highlight in red).

Tháp Mười ward has a geographical location:

- To the east, it borders Đốc Binh Kiều commune.
- To the south, it borders Thanh Mỹ commune.
- To the west, it borders Mỹ Quí commune.
- To the north, it borders Trường Xuân commune.

== History ==
Prior to 2025, Tháp Mười ward was formerly Mỹ An commune-level town, Mỹ An commune, and Mỹ Hòa commune in Tháp Mười district, Đồng Tháp province.

On June 12, 2025, the National Assembly of Vietnam issued Resolution No. 202/2025/QH15 on the reorganization of provincial-level administrative units. Accordingly:

- Đồng Tháp province was established by merging the entire area and population of Đồng Tháp province and Tiền Giang province.

On June 16, 2025, the Standing Committee of the National Assembly of Vietnam issued Resolution No. 1663/NQ-UBTVQH15 on the reorganization of commune-level administrative units. Accordingly:

- Tháp Mười commune was established by merging the entire area and population of Mỹ An commune-level town, Mỹ An commune, and Mỹ Hòa commune (formerly part of Tháp Mười district).

On May 11, 2026, the People's Council of Đồng Tháp province approved the plan to establish 11 new wards in the province. Accordingly:

- The Tháp Mười ward was established based on the entire area and population of Tháp Mười commune.
