= Tháp Mười district =

Coordinates: 10.583°N 105.800°E

Tháp Mười district Huyện Tháp Mười
- District
- Seal

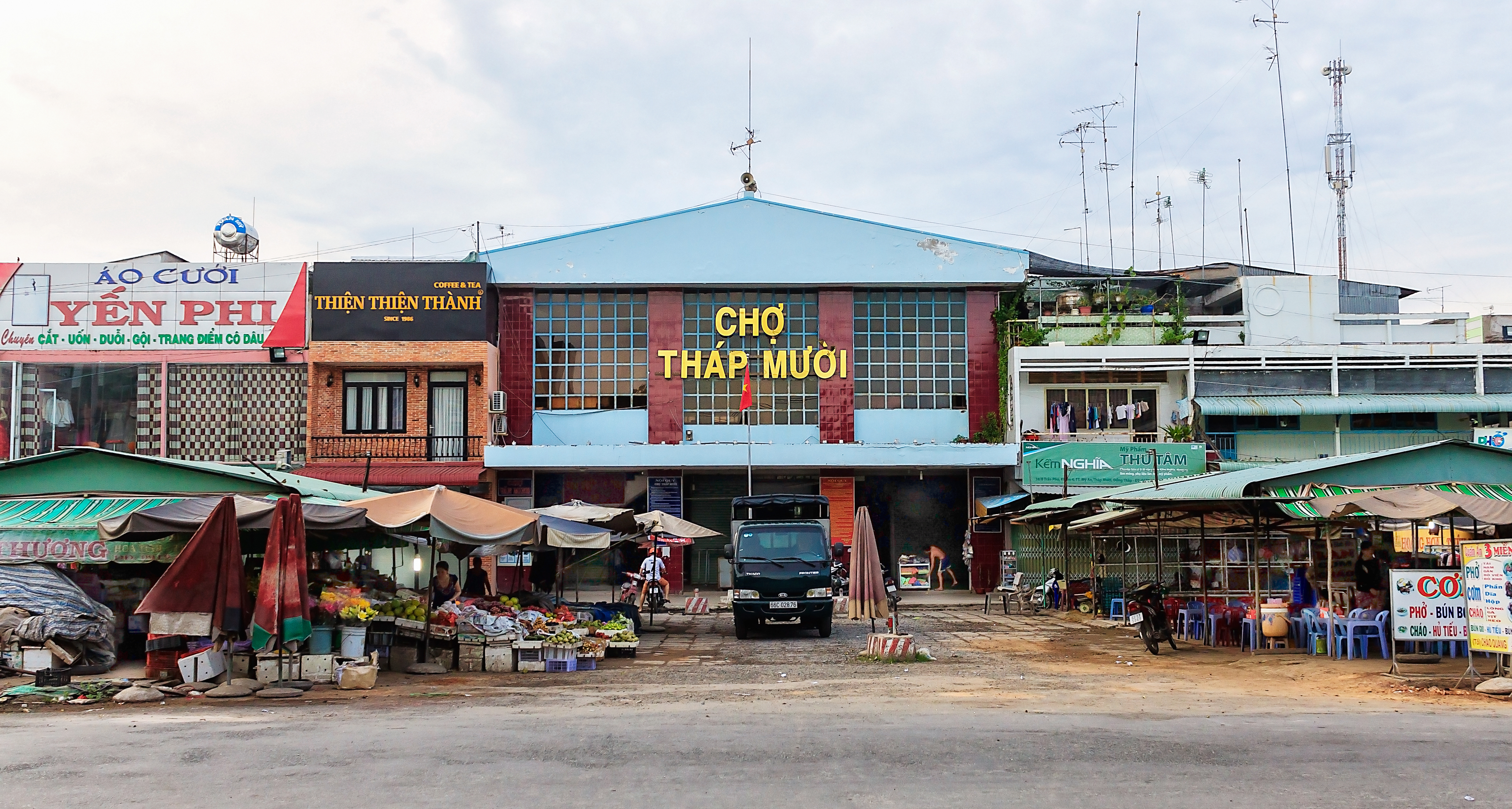
- Tháp Mười market
- Country: Vietnam
- Region: Mekong Delta
- Province: Đồng Tháp
- Capita: Mỹ An

Area
  - Total: 200 sq mi (518 km^{2})

Population (2019)
  - Total: 166,481
- Time zone: UTC+7 (Indochina Time)

Tháp Mười was a rural district of Đồng Tháp province in the Đồng Tháp Mười region of Vietnam. As of 2003 the district had a population of 123,123. The district covers an area of 518 km^{2} (200 sq mi). The district capital lies at Mỹ An.

On June 16, 2025, the Standing Committee of the National Assembly issued Resolution No. 1685/NQ-UBTVQH15. The district was dissolved and new wards were rearranged from the district.

== Divisions ==
The district is divided into one urban ward and 13 communes:

Tháp Mười (ward), Hưng Thạnh, Mỹ An, Mỹ Hoà, Trường Xuân, Thanh Mỹ, Đốc Binh Kiều, Mỹ Quý, Mỹ Đông, Tân Kiều, Phú Điền, Thạnh Lợi, Láng Biển and Thị Trấn Mỹ An.
