= Trường Xuân, Đồng Tháp =

Trường Xuân
- Commune
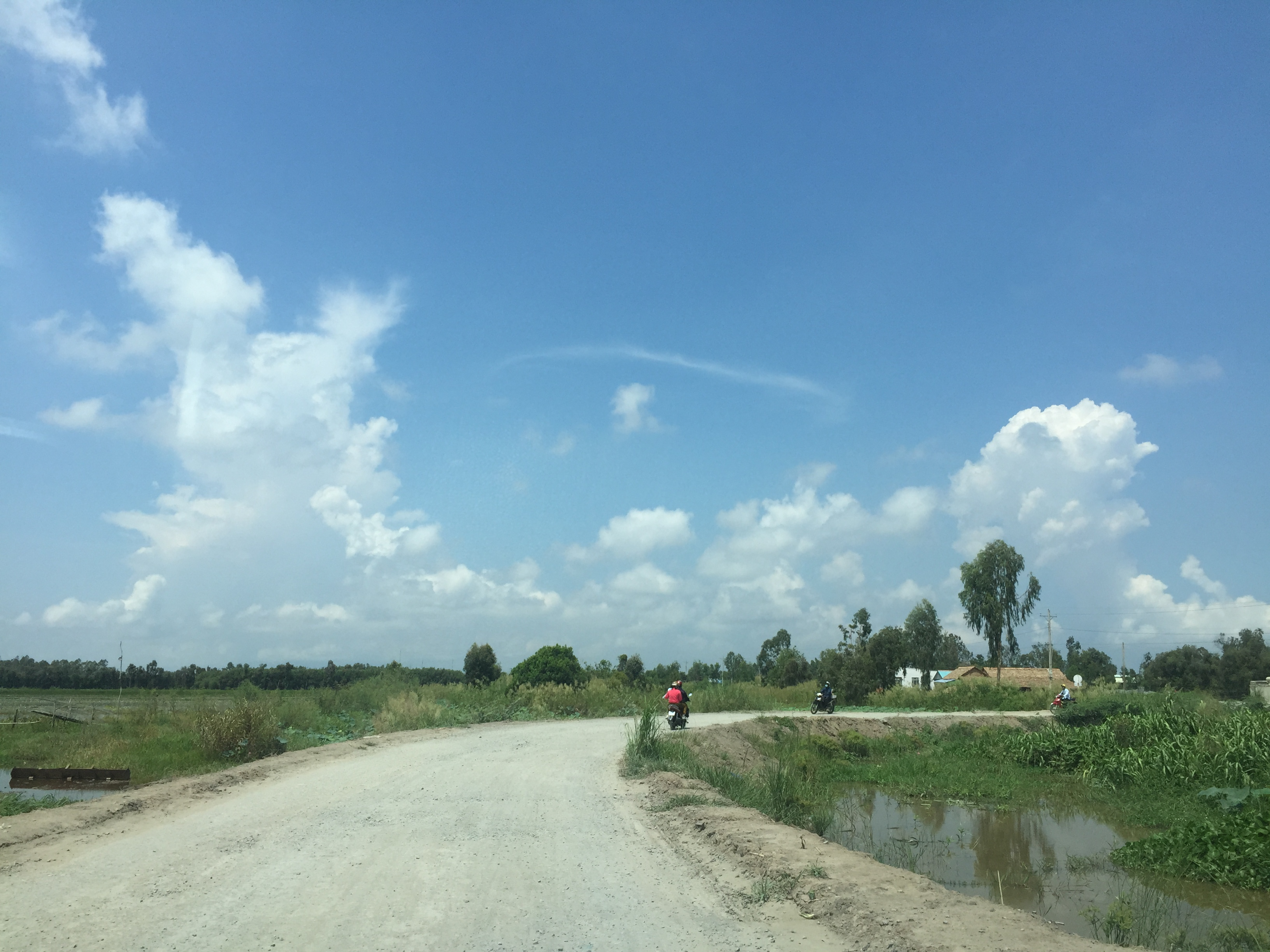
- Interactive map of Trường Xuân
- Country: Vietnam
- Region: Mekong Delta
- Province: Đồng Tháp
- Establish: December 27, 1980
- Merger: June 16, 2025

Area
  - Total: 114 km^{2} (44 sq mi)

Population (2024)
  - Total: 18,124 people
  - Density: 159/km^{2} (412/sq mi)

Trường Xuân is a commune in Đồng Tháp province, Vietnam. It is one of 102 communes and wards in the province.
