= Cao Lãnh district =

Cao Lãnh district Huyện Cao Lãnh
- District
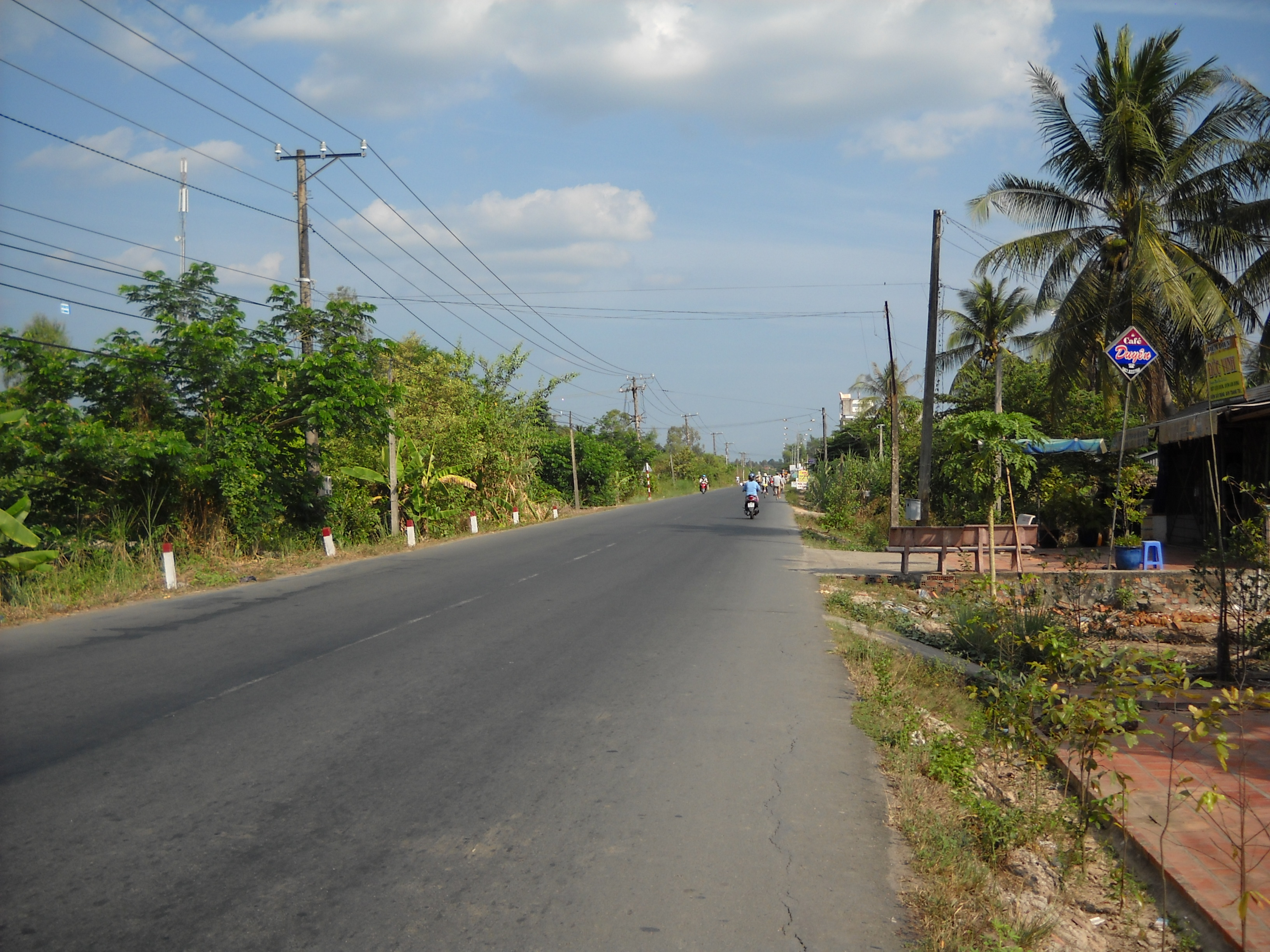
- Highway 30, Cao Lãnh District
- Interactive map of Cao Lãnh district
- Location within Vietnam
- Country: Vietnam
- Region: Mekong Delta
- Province: Đồng Tháp
- Capital: Mỹ Thọ township

Area
  - Total: 190 sq mi (491 km^{2})

Population (2019)
  - Total: 328,200
  - Density: 1,100/sq mi (420/km^{2})
- Time zone: UTC+7 (Indochina Time)

Cao Lãnh is a district in Đồng Tháp province. The district capital lies at Mỹ Thọ township, 8 km (5.0 mi) southeast of Cao Lãnh City.

== Divisions ==
The district is divided into 1 township and 17 rural communes, including:

- Mỹ Thọ township
- An Bình
- Ba Sao
- Bình Hàng Tây
- Bình Hàng Trung
- Bình Thạnh
- Gáo Giồng
- Mỹ Hiệp
- Mỹ Hội
- Mỹ Long
- Mỹ Thọ
- Mỹ Xương
- Nhị Mỹ
- Phong Mỹ
- Phương Thịnh
- Phương Trà
- Tân Hội Trung
- Tân Nghĩa
