= An Hữu =

- Ward
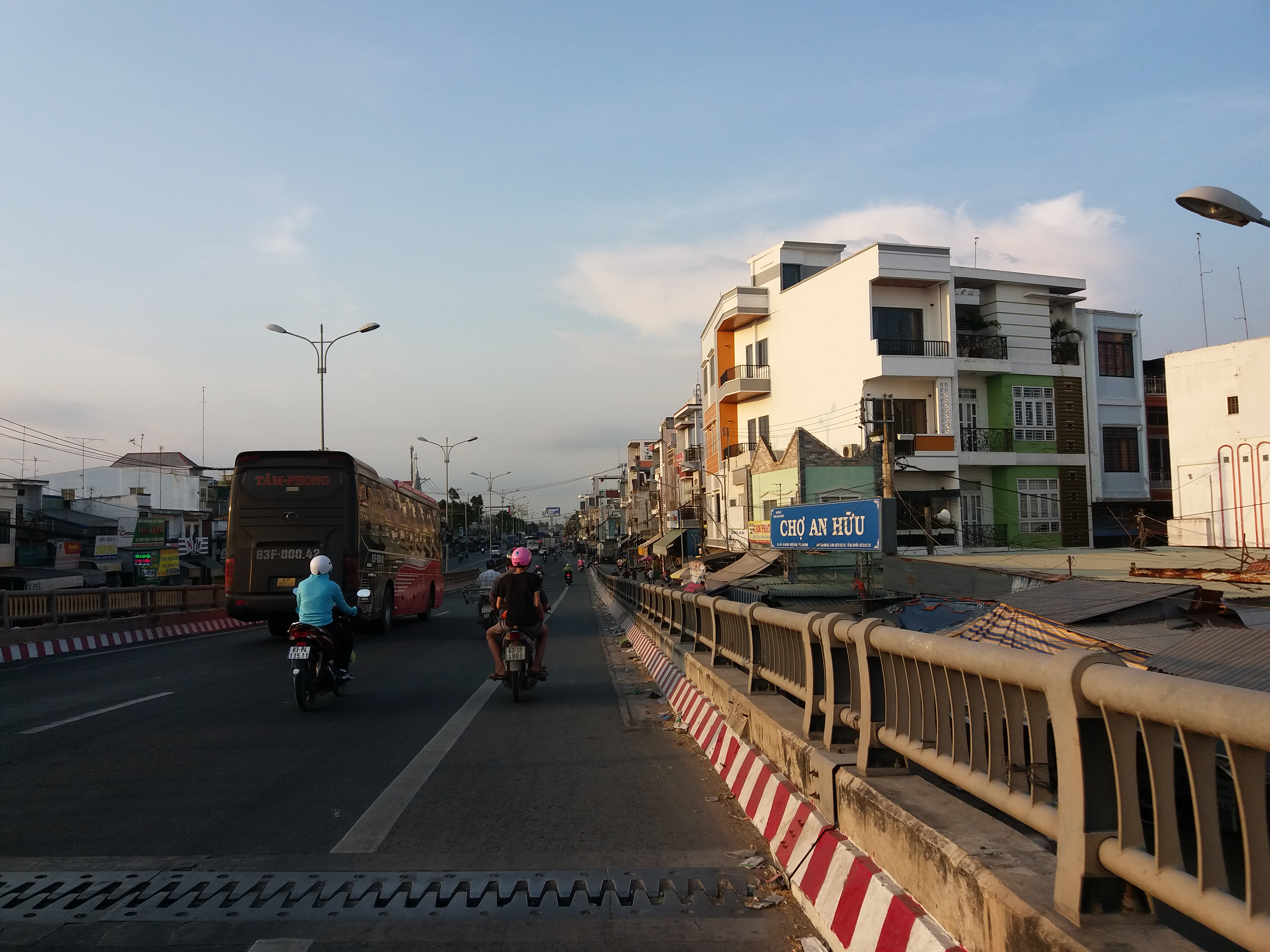
- An Hữu Bridge on National Highway 1
- Interactive map of An Hữu
- Coordinates: 10°18′28″N 105°53′13″E
- Country: Vietnam
- Province: Đồng Tháp
- Established: June 16, 2025
- Become a ward: May 11, 2026

Area
  - Total: 16.97 sq mi (43.94 km^{2})

Population (2024)
  - Total: 52,177 people
  - Density: 3,076/sq mi (1,187/km^{2})
- Time zone: UTC+07:00 (Indochina Time)
- Administrative code: 28429

An Hữu is a ward in Đồng Tháp province, Vietnam. It is one of the 102 new wards, communes of the province.

== Geography ==
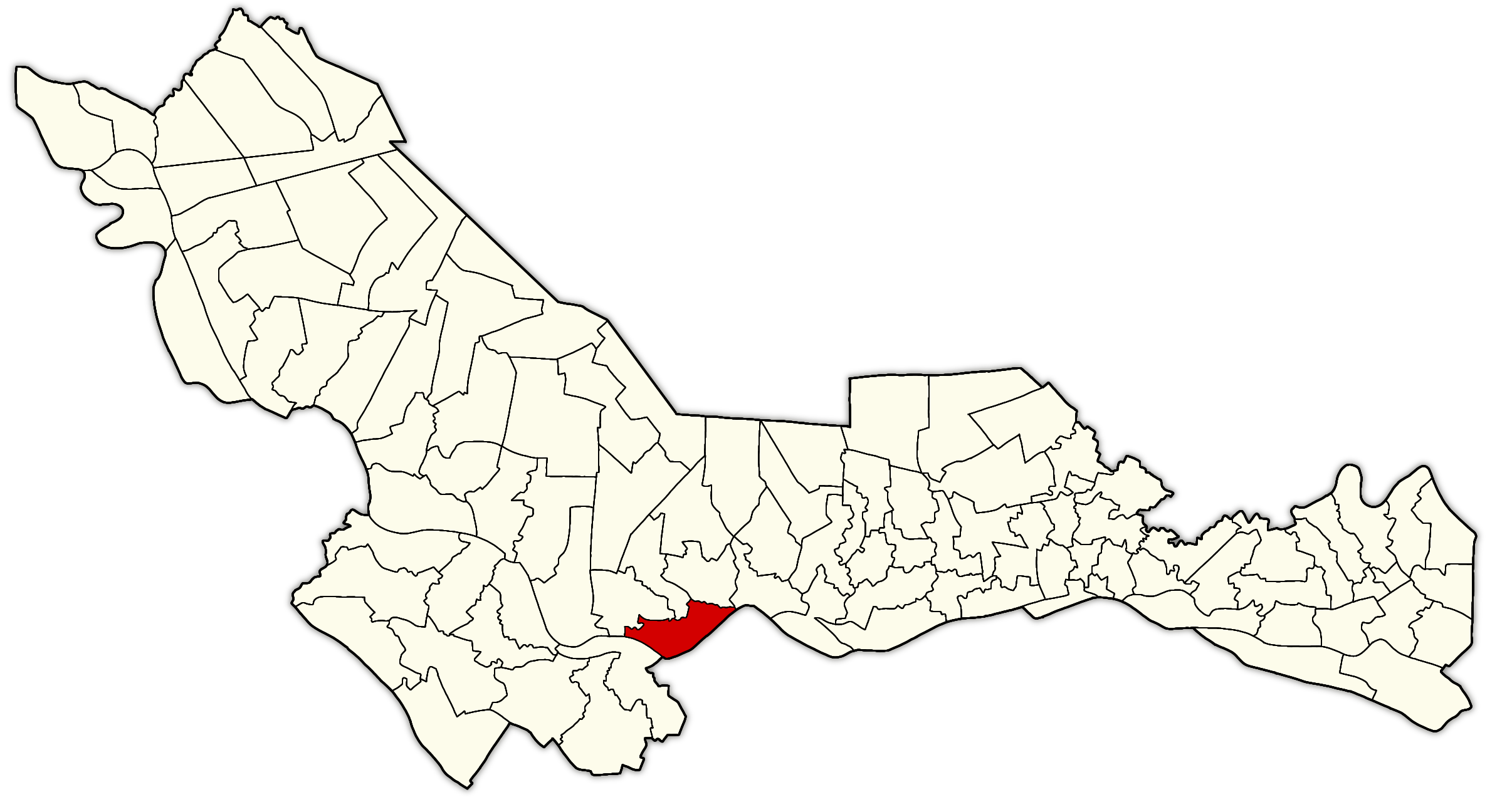
Location of An Hữu ward on the map of Đồng Tháp province (highlight in red).

An Hữu is a ward located in Đồng Tháp province. It is approximately 40 km southeast of Cao Lãnh ward and 60 km west of Mỹ Tho ward, with the following geographical location:

- To the east, it borders An Bình commune in Vĩnh Long province, with the Tiền river forming the boundary.
- To the northwest, it borders Thanh Hưng commune.
- To the southwest, it borders Phú Hựu commune, with the Tiền river forming the boundary.
- To the north, it borders communes Cái Bè, Mỹ Đức Tây, and Mỹ Lợi.
- To the south, it borders Tân Ngãi ward in Vĩnh Long province, with the Tiền river forming the boundary.

== History ==
Before 2025, the area that is now An Hữu commune comprised Hòa Hưng, An Hữu, and Mỹ Lương communes in Cái Bè district, Tiền Giang province.

On June 12, 2025, the 15th National Assembly issued Resolution No. 202/2025/QH15 on the rearrangement of provincial-level administrative units. Accordingly:

- The entire natural area and population size of Tiền Giang province and Đồng Tháp province are combined into a new province called Đồng Tháp province.

On June 16, 2025, the Standing Committee of the National Assembly issued Resolution No. 1663/NQ-UBTVQH15 on the rearrangement of commune-level administrative units in Đồng Tháp province in 2025. Accordingly:

- An Hữu commune was established by merging the entire area and population of An Hữu, Hòa Hưng, and Mỹ Lương communes (excerpt from Clause 41, Article 1).

On May 11, 2026, the People's Council of Đồng Tháp province approved the plan to establish 11 new wards in the province. Accordingly:

- The An Hữu ward was established based on the entire area and population of An Hữu commune.

== Administrative divisions ==
An Hữu commune is divided into 16 hamlet, including: 1, 2, 3, 4, 5, Khu Phố, Hoà, Bình, Thống, Nhất, Lương Nhơn, Lương Ngãi, Lương Tín, Lương Lễ, Lương Trí 1, Lương Trí 2.
