= Thạnh Hưng (disambiguation) =

Thạnh Hưng is a commune of An Giang province.

Thạnh Hưng may also refer to:

- Former name of Lấp Vò District: Thạnh Hưng District

== See also ==
- Thanh Hưng, a rural commune of Điện Biên District
