= Mỹ Đức =

Mỹ Đức may refer to several places in Vietnam, including:

- Mỹ Đức District, a former rural district of Hanoi
- Mỹ Đức (commune), a rural commune of Hanoi
- Mỹ Đức, Kiên Giang, a ward of Hà Tiên
- Mỹ Đức, Haiphong, a commune of An Lão District, Haiphong
- Mỹ Đức, An Giang, a commune of Châu Phú District
- Mỹ Đức, Lâm Đồng, a commune of Đạ Tẻh District
- Mỹ Đức, Bình Định, a commune of Phù Mỹ District

== See also ==
- Mỹ Đức Đông, a commune in Cái Bè District, Tiền Giang Province
- Mỹ Đức Tây, a commune in Cái Bè District, Tiền Giang Province
