= Hội Cư =

- Commune
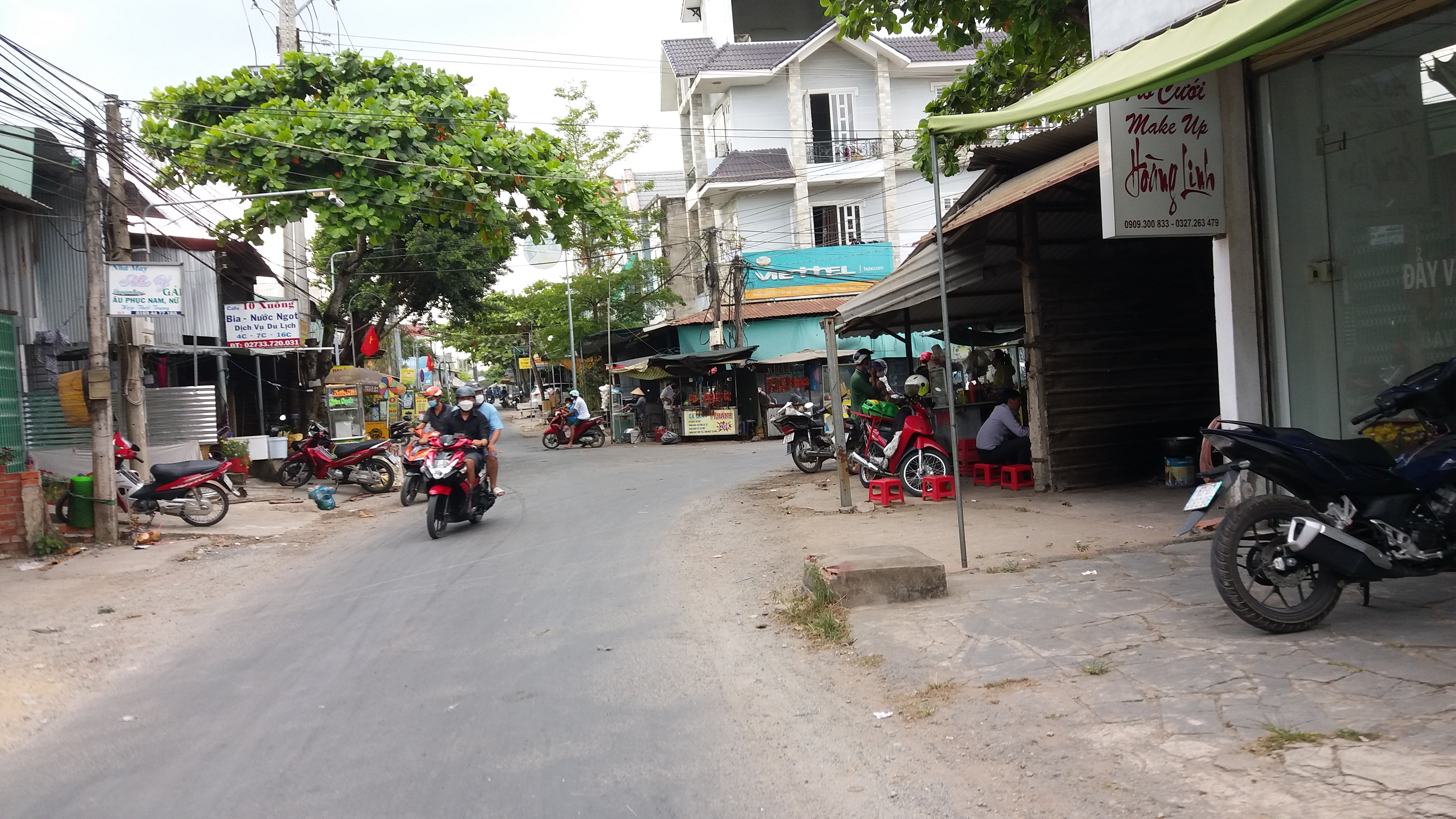
- Giồng market
- Interactive map of Hội Cư
- Country: Vietnam
- Province: Đồng Tháp
- Establish: June 16, 2025

Area
  - Total: 48.66 km^{2} (18.79 sq mi)

Population (2025)
  - Total: 52,774 people
  - Density: 1,085/km^{2} (2,809/sq mi)

Hội Cư is a commune in Đồng Tháp province, Vietnam. It is one of 102 communes and wards in the province after the 2025 reorganization.

== Geography ==
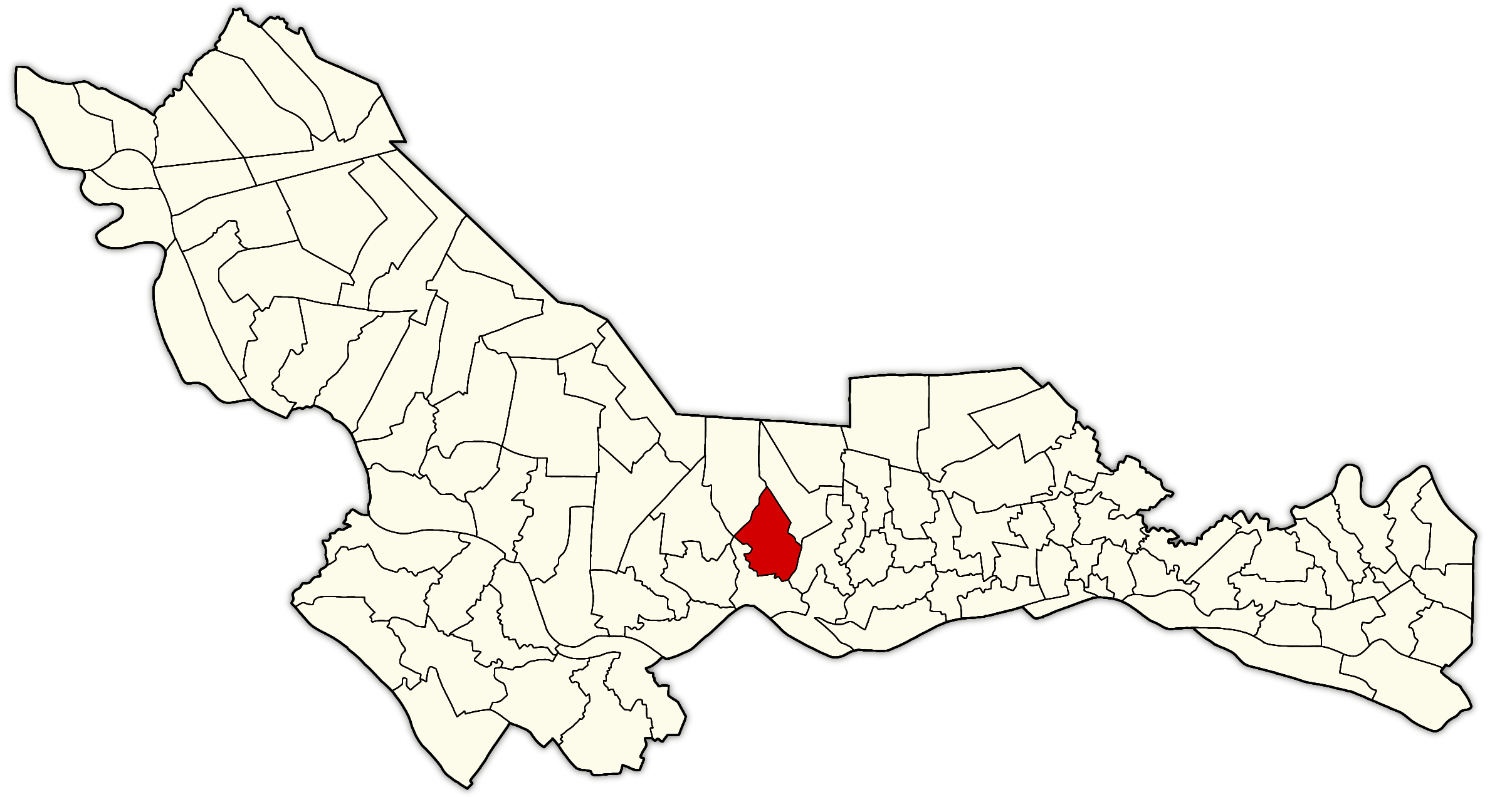
Location of Hội Cư commune on Đồng Tháp province map (highlight in red).

Hội Cư is a commune located in the eastern part of Đồng Tháp province, 55km east of Cao Lãnh ward and 50km west of Mỹ Tho ward. The commune has the following geographical location:

- To the east, it borders Mỹ Thành commune and Bình Phú commune.
- To the southwest and south, it borders Cái Bè commune.
- To the northwest it borders Hậu Mỹ commune.

== History ==
Prior to 2025, Hội Cư commune consisted of the communes of Mỹ Hội, An Cư, Hậu Thành, and Hậu Mỹ Phú in Cái Bè district, Tiền Giang province.

On June 12, 2025, the National Assembly of Vietnam issued Resolution No. 202/2025/QH15 on the reorganization of provincial-level administrative units. Accordingly:

- Đồng Tháp province was established by merging the entire area and population of Đồng Tháp province and Tiền Giang province.

On June 16, 2025, the Standing Committee of the National Assembly of Vietnam issued Resolution No. 1663/NQ-UBTVQH15 on the reorganization of commune-level administrative units in Đồng Tháp province. Accordingly:

- Hội Cư commune was established by merging the entire area and population of Mỹ Hội, An Cư, Hậu Thành, Hậu Mỹ Phú (formerly part of Cái Bè district).
