= Mỹ Lợi =

- Commune
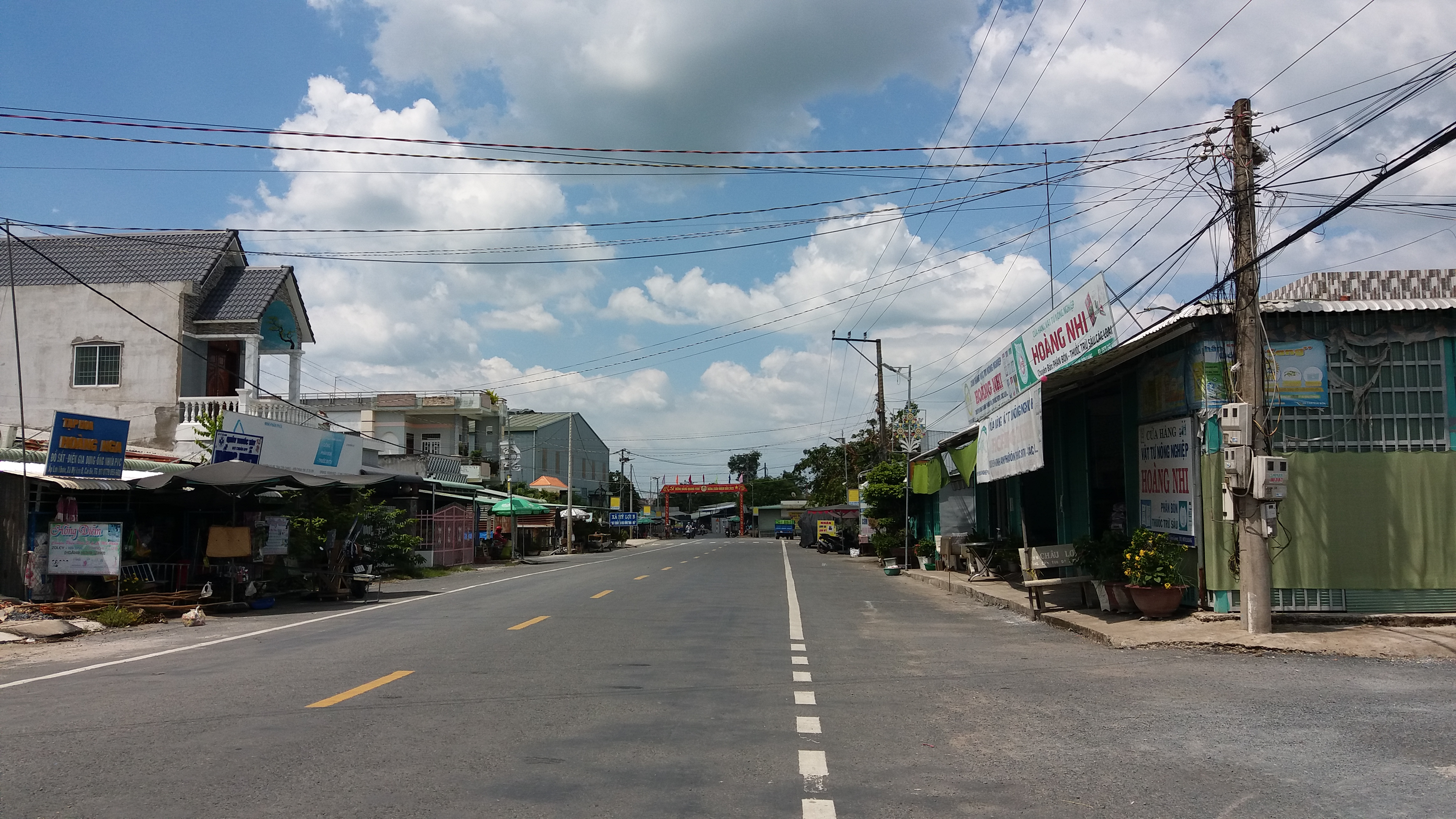
- A road in the commune
- Interactive map of Mỹ Lợi
- Country: Vietnam
- Province: Đồng Tháp
- Establish: June 16, 2025

Area
  - Total: 43.76 km^{2} (16.90 sq mi)

Population (2025)
  - Total: 33,781 people
  - Density: 772.0/km^{2} (1,999/sq mi)
- Time zone: UTC+07:00

Mỹ Lợi is a commune in Đồng Tháp province, Vietnam. It is one of 102 communes and wards in the province following the 2025 reorganization.

== Geography ==
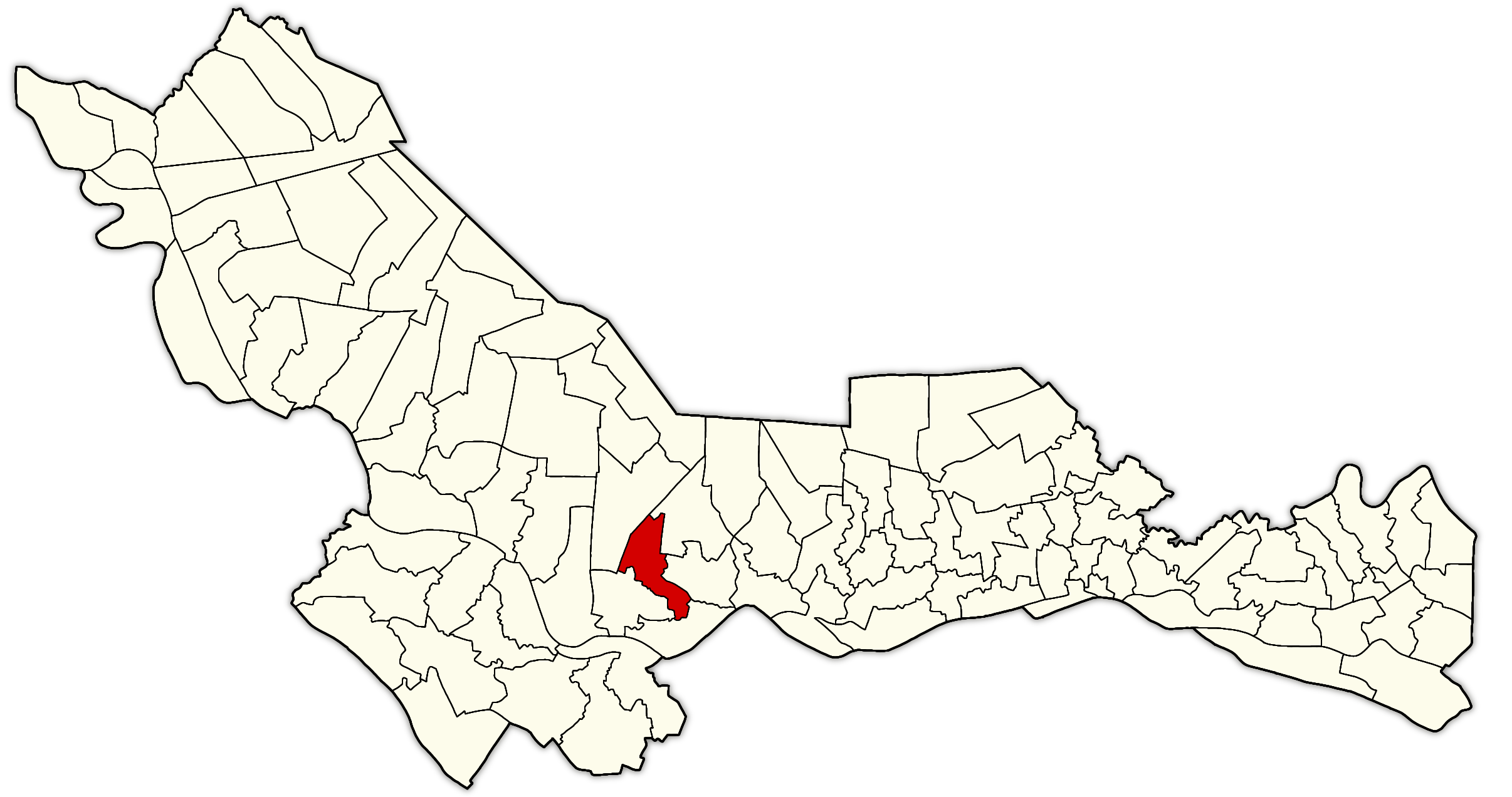
Location of Mỹ Lợi commune on Đồng Tháp province map (highlight in red).

Mỹ Lợi commune has the following geographical location:

- To the south, it borders An Hữu commune.
- To the southwest, it borders Thanh Hưng commune.
- To the northwest it borders Thanh Mỹ commune.
- To the northeast, it borders Mỹ Thiện commune.
- To the east, it borders Mỹ Đức Tây commune.

== History ==
Prior to 2025, Mỹ Lợi commune consisted of Mỹ Lợi A, Mỹ Lợi B, and An Thái Đông communes in Cái Bè district, Tiền Giang province.

On June 12, 2025, the National Assembly of Vietnam issued Resolution No. 202/2025/QH15 on the reorganization of provincial-level administrative units. Accordingly:

- Đồng Tháp province was established by merging the entire area and population of Đồng Tháp province and Tiền Giang province.

On June 16, 2025, the Standing Committee of the National Assembly of Vietnam issued Resolution No. 1663/NQ-UBTVQH15 on the reorganization of commune-level administrative units in Đồng Tháp province. Accordingly:

- Mỹ Lợi commune was established by merging the entire area and population of An Thái Đông and Mỹ Lợi A, Mỹ Lợi B communes (formerly part of Cái Bè district).
