= Cái Bè =

- Ward
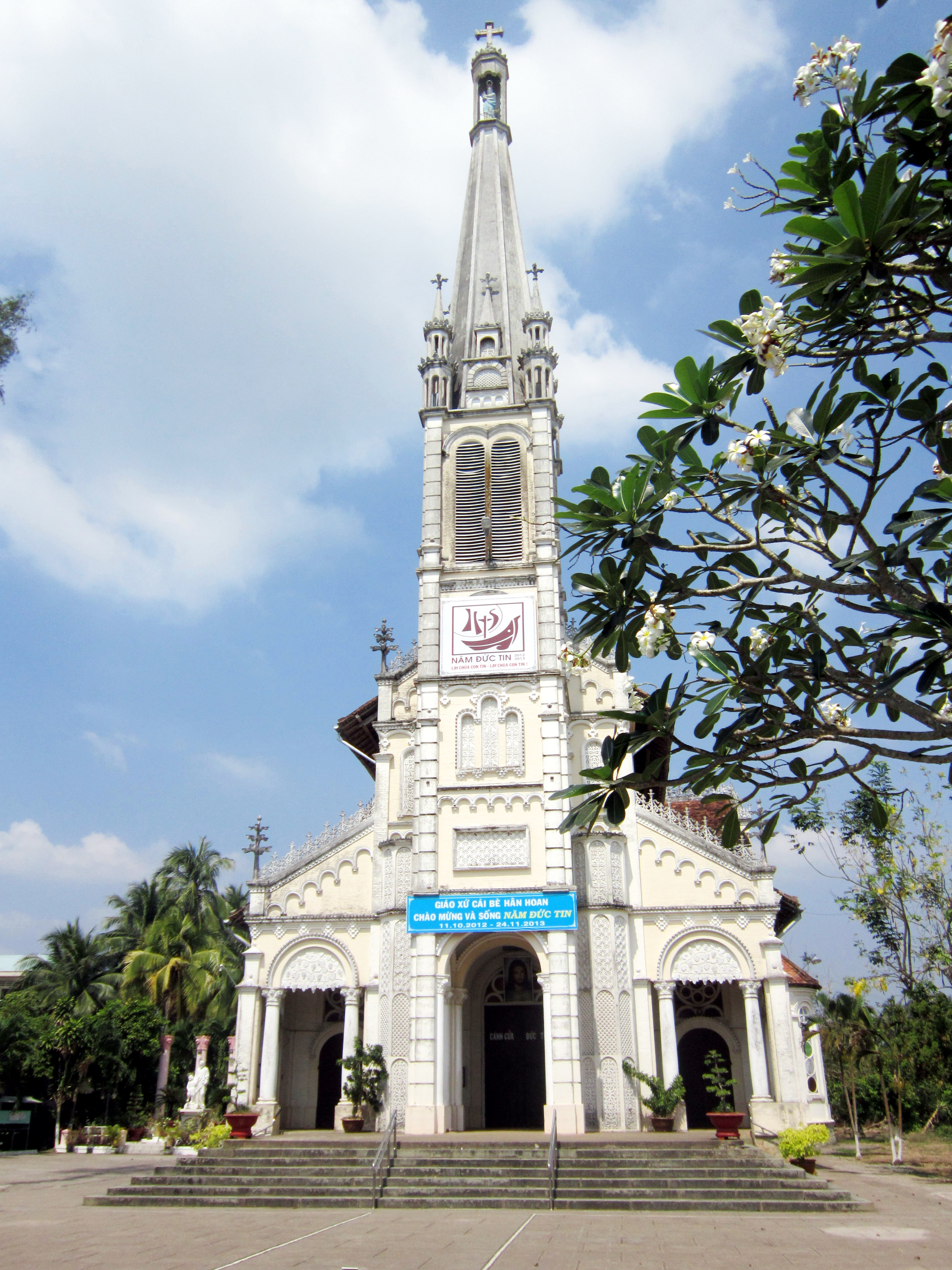
- Cái Bè church
- Interactive map of Cái Bè
- Coordinates: 10°20′05″N 106°01′57″E
- Country: Vietnam
- Province: Đồng Tháp
- Established: June 16, 2025
- Became a ward: May 11, 2026

Area
  - Total: 12.68 sq mi (32.84 km^{2})

Population (2025)
  - Total: 67,246 people
  - Density: 5,303/sq mi (2,048/km^{2})
- Time zone: UTC+07:00

Cái Bè is a ward in Đồng Tháp province, Vietnam. It is one of 102 communes and wards in the province.

== Geography ==
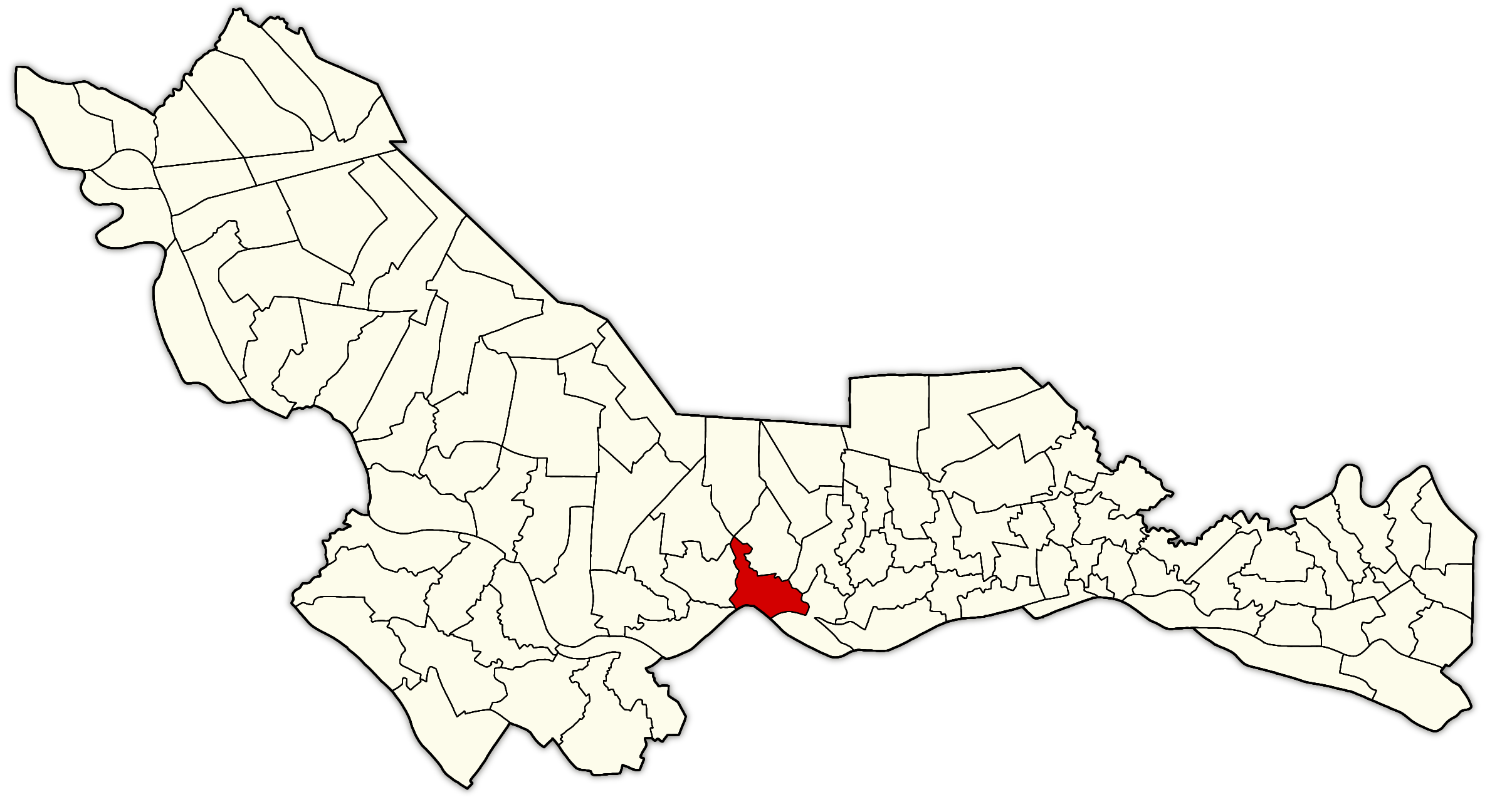
Location of Cái Bè ward on Đồng Tháp province map (highlight in red).

Cái Bè is a ward located in the eastern part of Đồng Tháp province, situated approximately 55 km (34 mi) east of Cao Lãnh ward and 40 km (25 mi) west of Mỹ Tho ward. The commune has the following geographical location:

- To the east, it borders Hiệp Đức commune.
- To the northeast, it borders Bình Phú commune.
- To the west, it borders Mỹ Đức Tây and An Hữu communes.
- To the northwest, it borders Mỹ Thiện and Hậu Mỹ Communes.
- To the north, it borders Hội Cư Commune.
- To the south, it borders An Bình commune of Vĩnh Long province.

== Administration divisions ==
Cái Bè ward is divided into 18 hamlets: 1, 2, 3, 4, An Bình Đông, An Hiệp, An Hòa, An Lợi, An Ninh, An Thạnh, Hòa Điền, Hòa Hảo, Hòa Lược, Hòa Phú, Hòa Phúc, Hòa Quí, Khu Phố, and Phú Hòa.

== History ==
The land of the current ward was originally part of the village of Đông Hòa Hiệp. In 1808, during the reign of Emperor Gia Long, there were 3 villages: An Bình Đông, An Bình Tân, and An Thạnh belonging to Kiến Phong district. During the reign of Emperor Thiệu Trị, they belonged to Phong Hòa district.

On July 12, 1877, An Bình Tây village was renamed Phú Hòa, and An Thạnh village was renamed An Hiệp.

On December 13, 1913, Phú Hòa village merged with An Bình Đông village and took the name An Bình Đông.

On October 24, 1925, An Bình Đông village merged with An Hiệp village and took the name Đông Hòa Hiệp, belonging to Phong Hòa commune.

During the First Indochina War, the government of the Democratic Republic of Vietnam called it Đông Hòa Hiệp commune, belonging to Cái Bè district. The State of Vietnam government placed Đông Hòa Hiệp commune under Phong Hòa district, Cái Bè county, Định Tường province.

During the Vietnam War, the National Liberation Front called it Cai Be town under Cai Be district, My Tho province, while the Republic of Vietnam government still called it Đông Hòa Hiệp commune under Cái Bè county, Định Tường province.

On February 24, 1976, the Provisional Revolutionary Government of the Republic of South Vietnam issued a Decree on the dissolution of zones and the merger of provinces in South Vietnam. Accordingly:

- Tiền Giang province was established based on the natural area and population size of Định Tường province, Gò Công province, and Mỹ Tho city.

At this time, the area of the current Cái Bè commune was Cái Bè commune-level town and the communes of Đông Hòa Hiệp and Hòa Khánh of Cái Bè district. Cái Bè commune-level town was then the capital of Cái Bè district.

On June 12, 2025, the 15th National Assembly of Vietnam issued Resolution No. 202/2025/QH15 on the rearrangement of provincial-level administrative units. Accordingly:

- Đồng Tháp province was established by merging the entire area, population of Đồng Tháp province and Tiền Giang province.

On June 16, 2025, the Standing Committee of the National Assembly issued Resolution No. 1663/NQ-UBTVQH15 on the rearrangement of commune-level administrative units of Dong Thap province in 2025 (effective from June 16, 2025). Accordingly:

- Cái Bè commune was established by merging the entire area and population of Cái Bè commune-level town and Đông Hòa Hiệp and Hòa Khánh communes (formerly part of Cái Bè district).

On May 11, 2026, the People's Council of Đồng Tháp province approved the plan to establish 11 new wards in the province. Accordingly:

- The Cái Bè ward was established based on the entire area and population of Cái Bè commune.
