= Mỹ Thiện =

- Commune
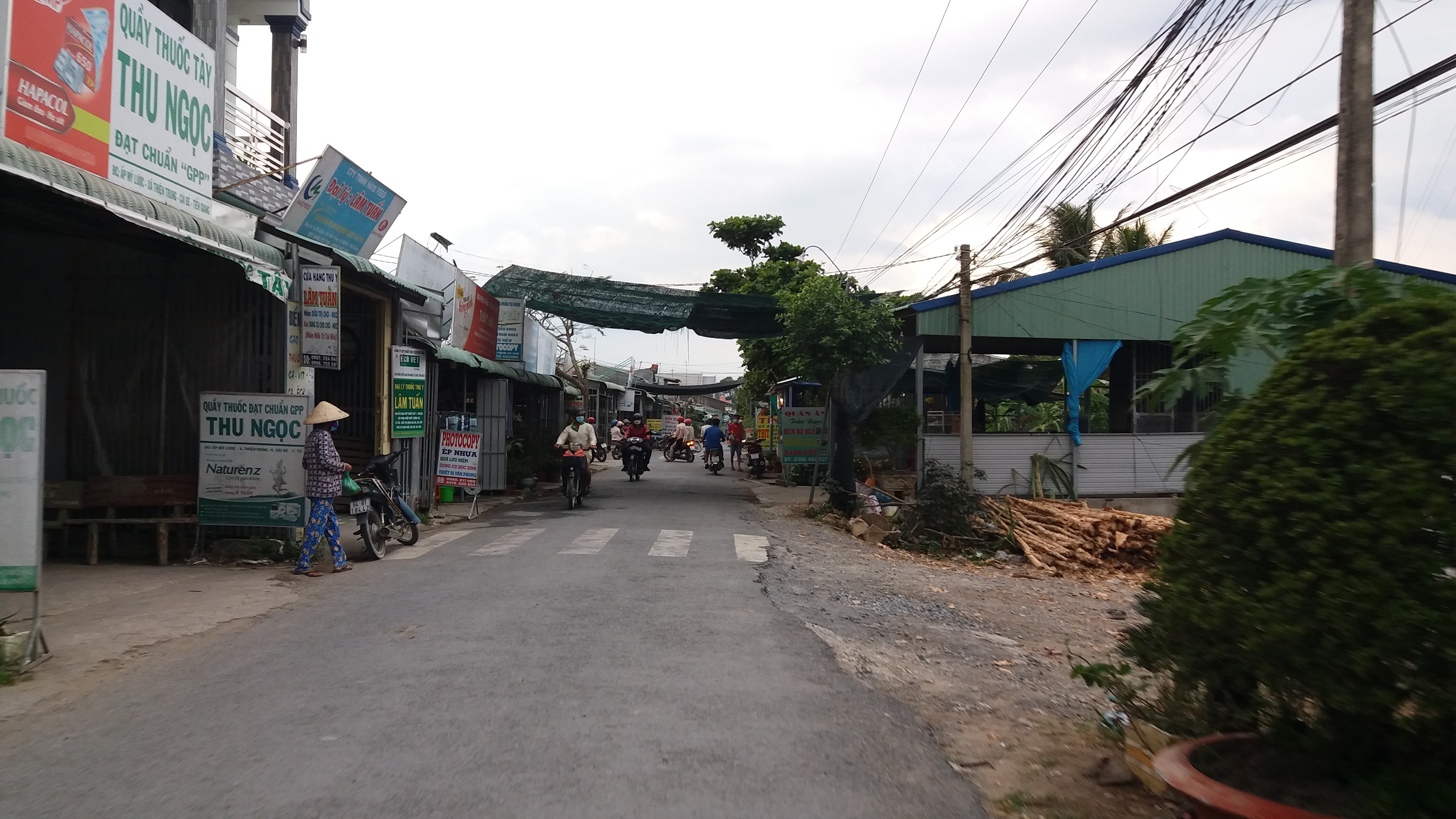
- Thiện Trung market area
- Interactive map of Mỹ Thiện
- Coordinates: 10°25′47″N 105°55′39″E
- Country: Vietnam
- Province: Đồng Tháp
- Establish: June 16, 2025

Area
  - Total: 62.59 km^{2} (24.17 sq mi)

Population (2025)
  - Total: 27,745 people
  - Density: 443.3/km^{2} (1,148/sq mi)
- Time zone: UTC+07:00

Mỹ Thiện is a commune in Đồng Tháp province, Vietnam. It is one of 102 communes and wards in the province following the 2025 reorganization.

== Geography ==
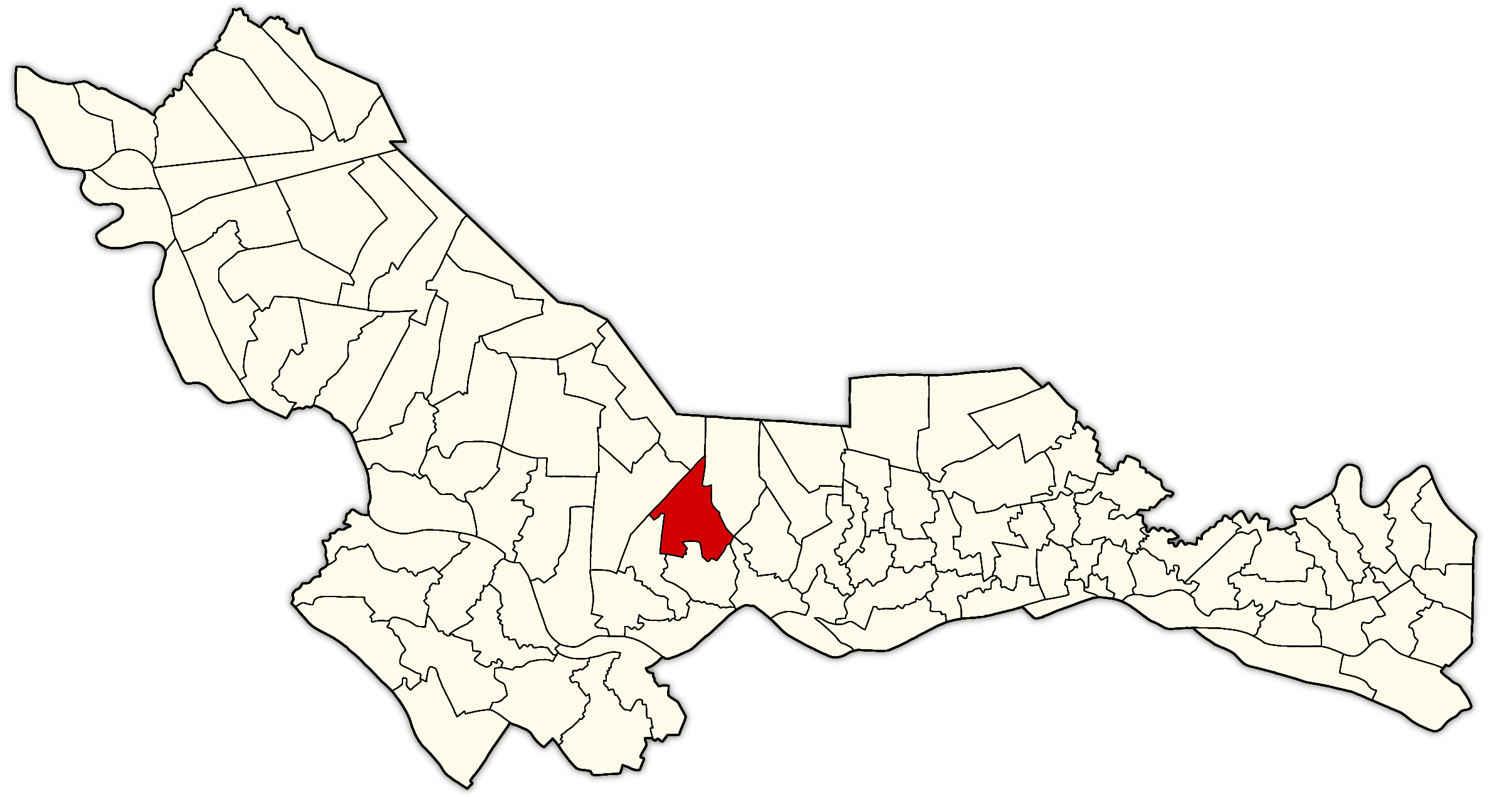
Location of Mỹ Thiện commune on Đồng Tháp province map (highlight in red).

Mỹ Thiện commune has the following geographical location:

- To the northwest, it borders Đốc Binh Kiều and Thanh Mỹ communes.
- To the southwest, it borders Mỹ Lợi commune.
- To the south, it borders Mỹ Đức Tây commune.
- To the east, it borders Hậu Mỹ and Cái Bè commune.

== History ==
Prior to 2025, Mỹ Thiện commune was formerly Mỹ Tân, Mỹ Trung, and Thiện Trung communes in Cái Bè, Tiền Giang province.

On June 12, 2025, the National Assembly of Vietnam issued Resolution No. 202/2025/QH15 on the reorganization of provincial-level administrative units. Accordingly:

- Đồng Tháp province was established by merging the entire area and population of Đồng Tháp province and Tiền Giang province.

On June 16, 2025, the Standing Committee of the National Assembly of Vietnam issued Resolution No. 1663/NQ-UBTVQH15 on the reorganization of commune-level administrative units in Đồng Tháp province. Accordingly:

- Mỹ Thiện commune was established by merging the entire area and population of Mỹ Tân, Mỹ Trung and Thiện Trung communes (formerly part of Cái Bè district).
