= D13E =

Vietnamese locomotive

D13E Locomotive
- D13E locomotive with blue and white livery in Nguyễn Đăng Tuân between Mỹ Đức and Đồng Hới in 2026
Type and origin
- Power type: Diesel
- Builder: Diesel Locomotive Works (India)
- Build date: 1984–2002
- Total produced: 25
Specifications
- Configuration
  - UIC: Co' Co'
- Gauge: 1,000 mm (3 ft 3 3/8 in)
- Length: 14,475 mm (47 ft 5.9 in)
- Width: 3,000 mm (9 ft 10 in)
- Height: 3,535 mm (11 ft 7.2 in)
- Axle load: 12 t
- Loco weight: 72 t
- Fuel type: Diesel
- Transmission: DC-DC
Performance figures
- Maximum speed: 100 km/h (62 mph)
- Power output: 1350 hp
Career
- Operators: Vietnam Railways
- Class: D13E
- Locale: Vietnam

The D13E is a diesel locomotive model currently used on the Vietnam Railways network. There are two liveries of D13E locomotives, red and white; blue and white.

== History ==
These locomotives were built by Diesel Locomotive Works in Varanasi, India. The D13E - 701 to D13E - 708 were built from 1983 to 1984; The D13E - 709 to D13E - 715 were built from 1984 to 1985 and the D13E - 716 to D13E - 725 were built from 2001 to 2002. In Vietnam, D13E - 716 to D13E - 725 with blue and white livery are popular in the North and D13E - 701 to D13E -715 with red and white livery are popular in the South.

== Information ==
- Manufacturer: Diesel Locomotive Works (India)
- Built: 1984–2002
- Power type: Diesel
- Gauge: 1,000 mm (3 ft 3 3/8 in)
- Maximum speed: 100 km/h (62 mph)
- Engine: DLW ALCO 251D-6 6-cylinder, 4-stroke inline
- Power: 1350 hp
- Transmission: DC - DC
- UIC: Co' Co'
