= Tân Ngãi =

- Ward
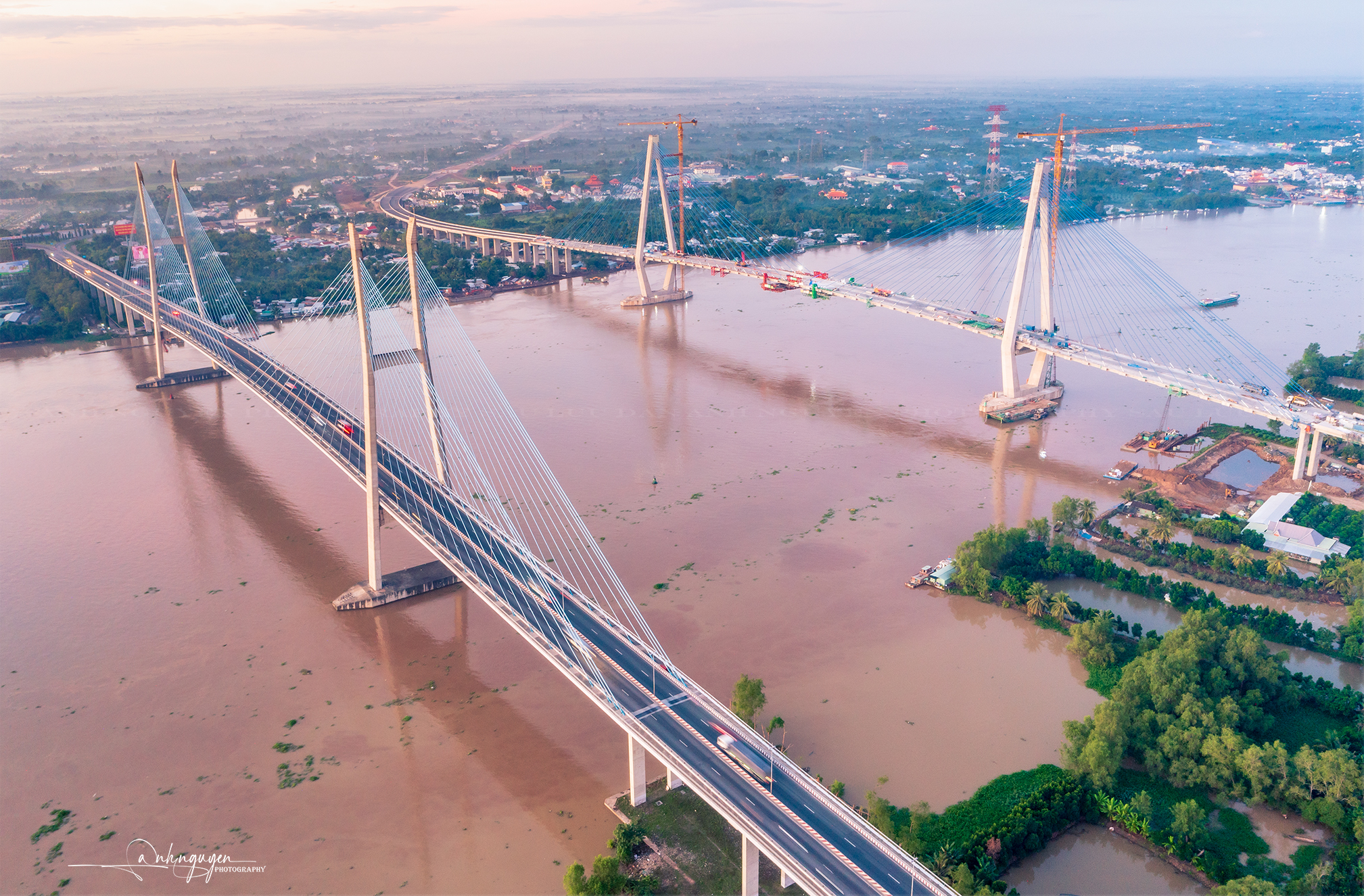
- Mỹ Thuận Bridge and Mỹ Thuận 2 Bridge on 2023. It connecting Vĩnh Long and Đồng Tháp provinces.
- Interactive map of Tân Ngãi
- Country: Vietnam
- Province: Vĩnh Long
- Establish: June 16, 2025

Area
  - Total: 21.7 km^{2} (8.4 sq mi)

Population
  - Total: 31,294 people
  - Density: 1,440/km^{2} (3,740/sq mi)

Tân Ngãi is a ward in Vĩnh Long province. It is one of 124 communes and wards in the province after the 2025 reorganization.

== Geography ==
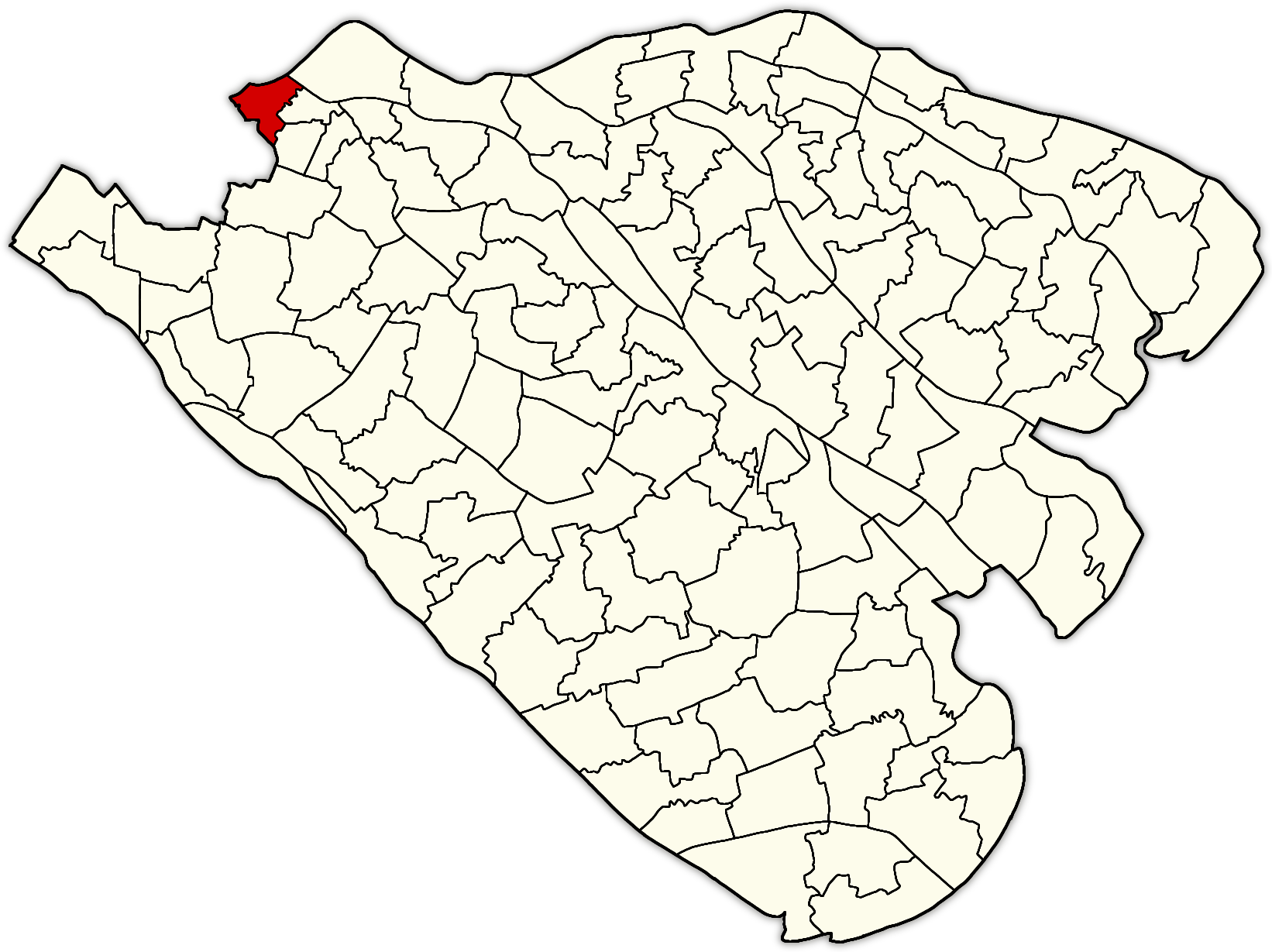
Location of Tân Ngãi ward on Vĩnh Long province map (highlight in red).

Tân Ngãi ward has a geographical location:

- To the east, it borders Long Châu ward and Tân Hạnh ward.
- To the west and south, it borders Phú Hựu commune and Đồng Tháp province.
- To the north, it borders An Bình and Đồng Tháp province (the boundary is the Cổ Chiên River).

== History ==
Prior to 2025, Tân Ngãi ward consisted of the wards: Tân Ngãi, Tân Hội, and Tân Hòa, belonging to Vĩnh Long provincial city, Vĩnh Long province.

On June 12, 2025, the National Assembly of Vietnam issued Resolution No. 202/2025/QH15 on the reorganization of provincial-level administrative units. Accordingly:

- Vĩnh Long province was established by merging the entire area and population of Bến Tre province, Vĩnh Long province, and Trà Vinh province.

On June 16, 2025, the Standing Committee of the National Assembly of Vietnam issued Resolution No. 1687/NQ-UBTVQH15 on the reorganization of commune-level administrative units in Vĩnh Long province. Accordingly:

- The Tân Ngãi ward was established by merging the entire area and population of Tân Ngãi, Tân Hòa, and Tân Hội wards (part of the former Vĩnh Long provincial city).

== Administrative divisions ==
Tân Ngãi Ward is divided into 16 neighborhoods: Mỹ Phú, Mỹ Thuận, Tân An, Tân Bình, Tân Hưng, Tân Nhơn, Tân Phú, Tân Quới, Tân Thạnh, Tân Thuận, Tân Thuận An, Tân Vĩnh Thuận, Tân Xuân, Vĩnh Bình, Vĩnh Hòa, and Vĩnh Phú.
