= Mỹ Đức Tây =

- Commune
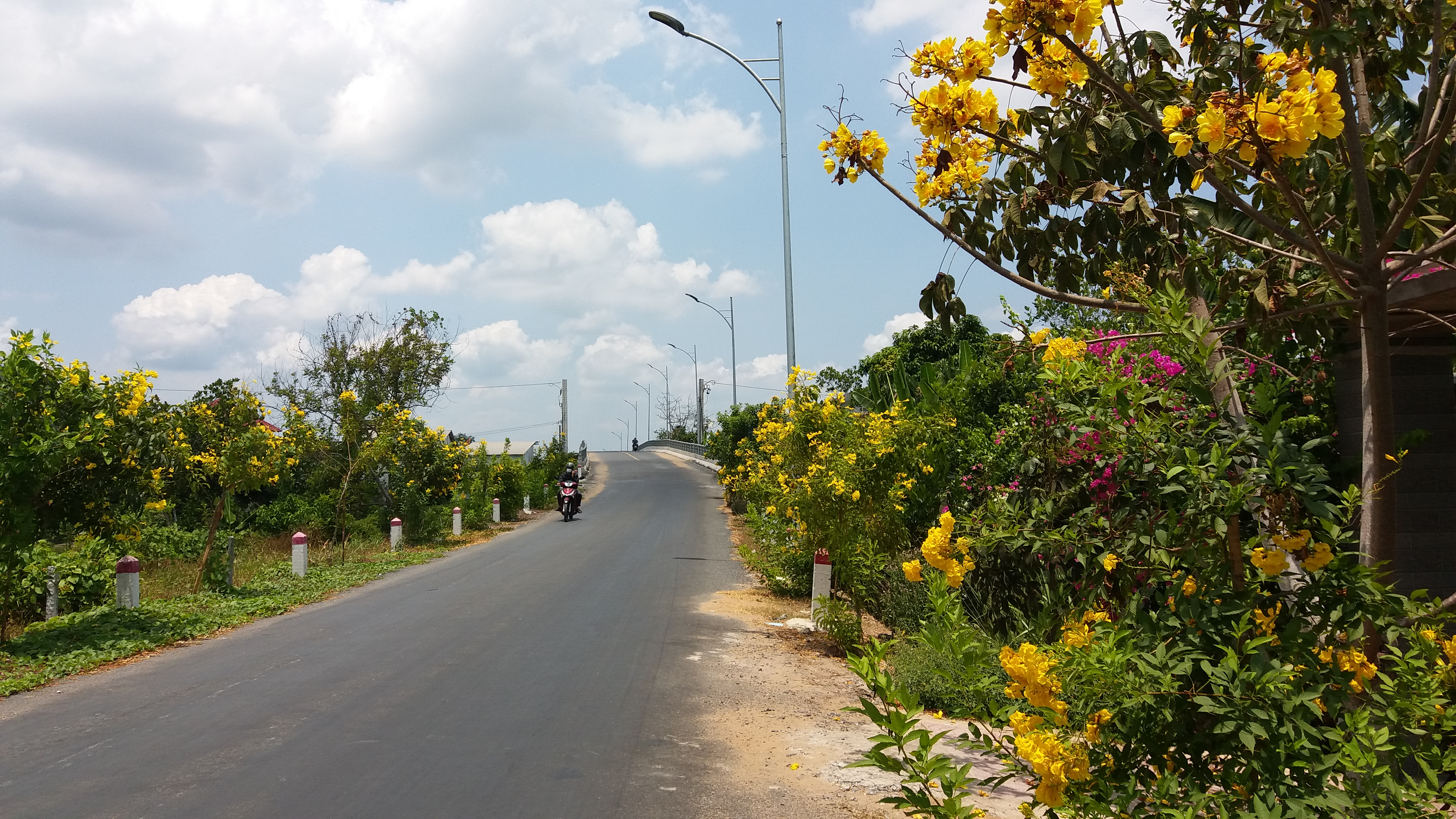
- A rural road in the commune
- Interactive map of Mỹ Đức Tây
- Country: Vietnam
- Province: Đồng Tháp
- Establish: June 16, 2025

Area
  - Total: 45.79 km^{2} (17.68 sq mi)

Population (2025)
  - Total: 36,897 people
  - Density: 805.8/km^{2} (2,087/sq mi)
- Time zone: UTC+07:00
- Website: http://myductay.dongthap.gov.vn/

Mỹ Đức Tây is a commune in Đồng Tháp province, Vietnam. It is one of 102 communes and wards in the province following the 2025 reorganization.

== Geography ==
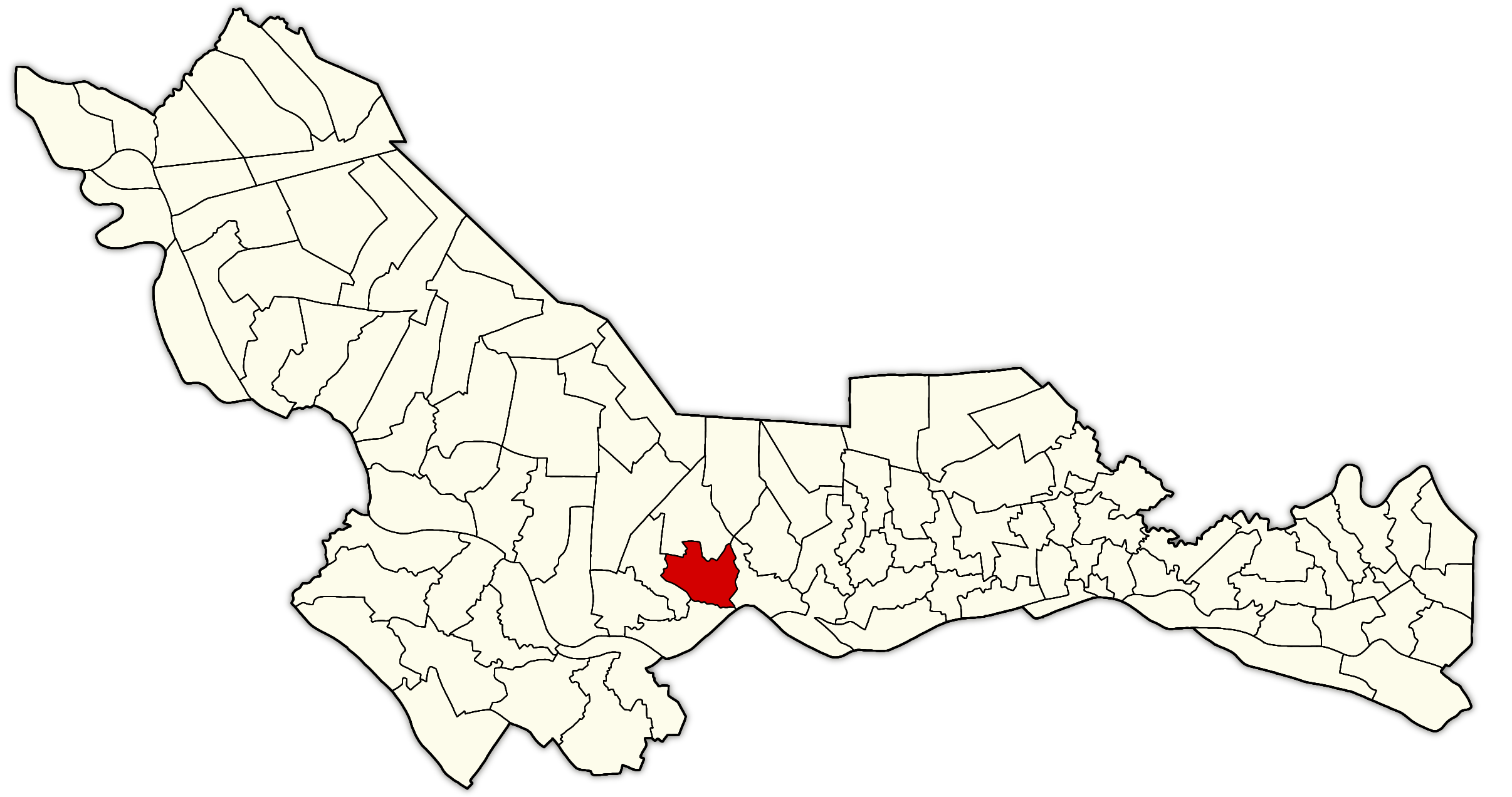
Location of Mỹ Đức Tây commune on Đồng Tháp province map (highlight in red).

Mỹ Đức Tây is a rural commune in Đồng Tháp province, located 45km east of Cao Lãnh ward and 55km west of Mỹ Tho ward. The commune has the following geographical location:

- To the east, it borders Cái Bè commune.
- To the north, it borders Mỹ Thiện commune.
- To the west, it borders Mỹ Lợi commune.
- To the south, it borders An Hữu commune.

== History ==
Prior to 2025, Mỹ Đức Tây commune was formerly Thiện Trí, Mỹ Đức Đông, and Mỹ Đức Tây communes in Cái Bè district, Tiền Giang province.

On June 12, 2025, the National Assembly of Vietnam issued Resolution No. 202/2025/QH15 on the reorganization of provincial-level administrative units. Accordingly:

- Đồng Tháp province was established by merging the entire area and population of Đồng Tháp province and Tiền Giang province.

On June 16, 2025, the Standing Committee of the National Assembly of Vietnam issued Resolution No. 1663/NQ-UBTVQH15 on the reorganization of commune-level administrative units in Đồng Tháp province. Accordingly:

- Mỹ Đức Tây commune was established by merging the entire area and population of Thiện Trí, Mỹ Đức Đông, and Mỹ Đức Tây communes (formerly part of Cái Bè district).
