= Thanh Hưng =

Commune in Đồng Tháp province, Vietnam

- Commune
- Interactive map of Thanh Hưng
- Coordinates: 10°18′49″N 105°50′37″E
- Country: Vietnam
- Region: Mekong Delta
- Province: Đồng Tháp
- Established: June 16, 2025

Area
  - Total: 20.03 sq mi (51.89 km^{2})

Population (2024)
  - Total: 46,314 people
  - Density: 2,312/sq mi (892.5/km^{2})
- Time zone: UTC+07:00 (Indochina Time)
- Administrative code: 28426

Thanh Hưng (Vietnamese: Thanh Hưng) is a commune in Đồng Tháp province, Vietnam. It is one of the 102 new wards, communes of the province following the reorganization in 2025.

== Geography ==
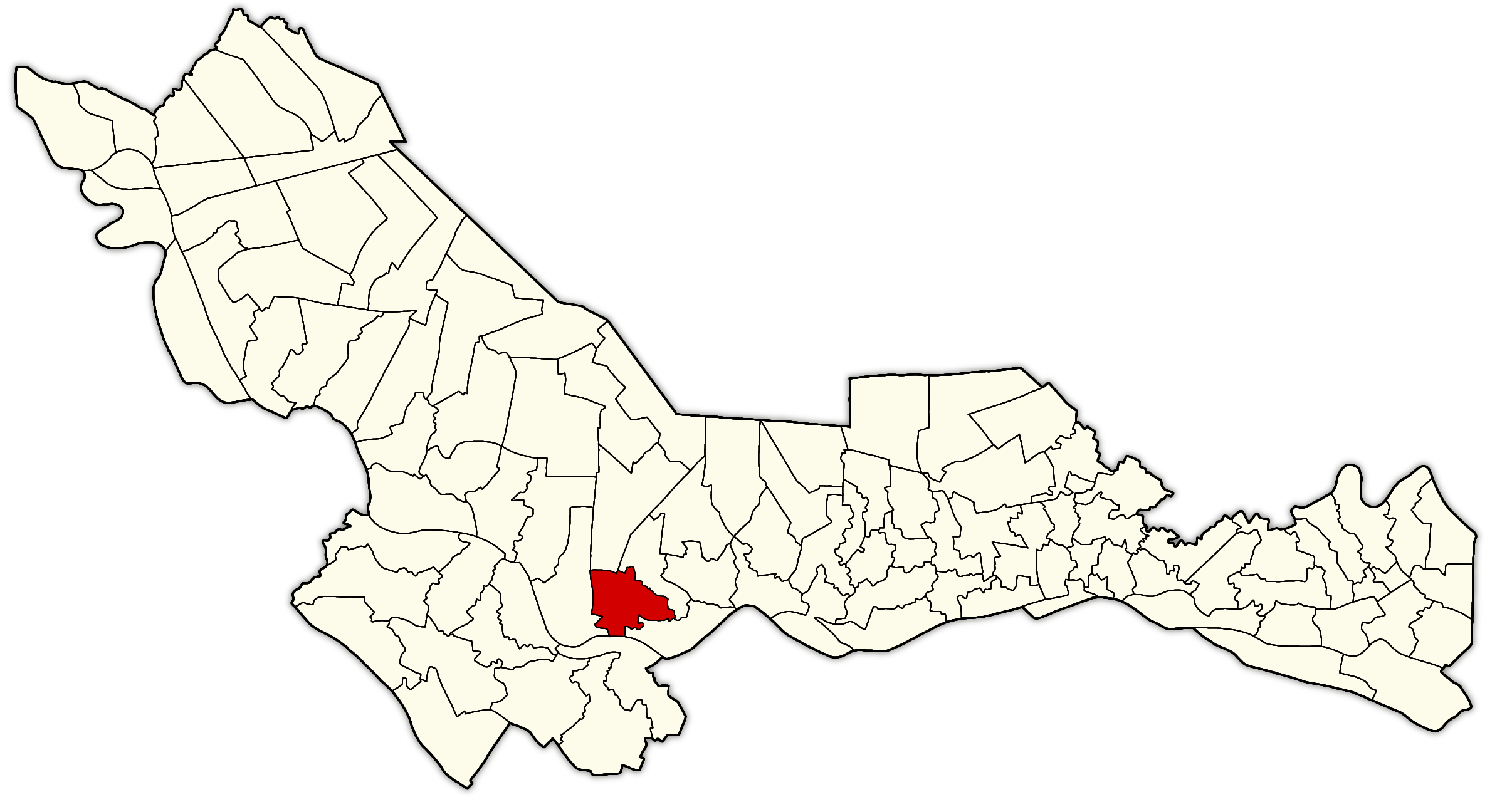
Location of Thanh Hưng commune on the map of Đồng Tháp province (highlight in red).

Thanh Hưng is a commune located in Đồng Tháp province, approximately 50 km southeast of Cao Lãnh ward and 60 km west of Mỹ Tho ward.

- To the northeast, it borders Mỹ Lợi commune.
- To the southeast, it borders An Hữu commune.
- To the west, it borders Mỹ Hiệp commune.
- To the south, it borders Phú Hựu commune.
- To the north, it borders Thanh Mỹ commune.

== History ==
Before 2025, Thanh Hưng commune corresponds to Tân Thanh, Tân Hưng, and An Thái Trung communes in Cái Bè district, Tiền Giang province.

On June 12, 2025, the 15th National Assembly of Vietnam issued Resolution No. 202/2025/QH15 on the rearrangement of provincial-level administrative units. Accordingly:

- The province of Đồng Tháp was established by merging the entire area and population of Đồng Tháp province and Tiền Giang province.

On June 16, 2025, the Standing Committee of the National Assembly issued Resolution No. 1663/NQ-UBTVQH15 on the rearrangement of commune-level administrative units in Đồng Tháp province in 2025. Accordingly:

- Thanh Hưng commune was established by merging the entire natural area and population of Tân Thanh, Tân Hưng, and An Thái Trung communes, formerly part of Cái Bè district.
