= Hậu Mỹ =

- Commune
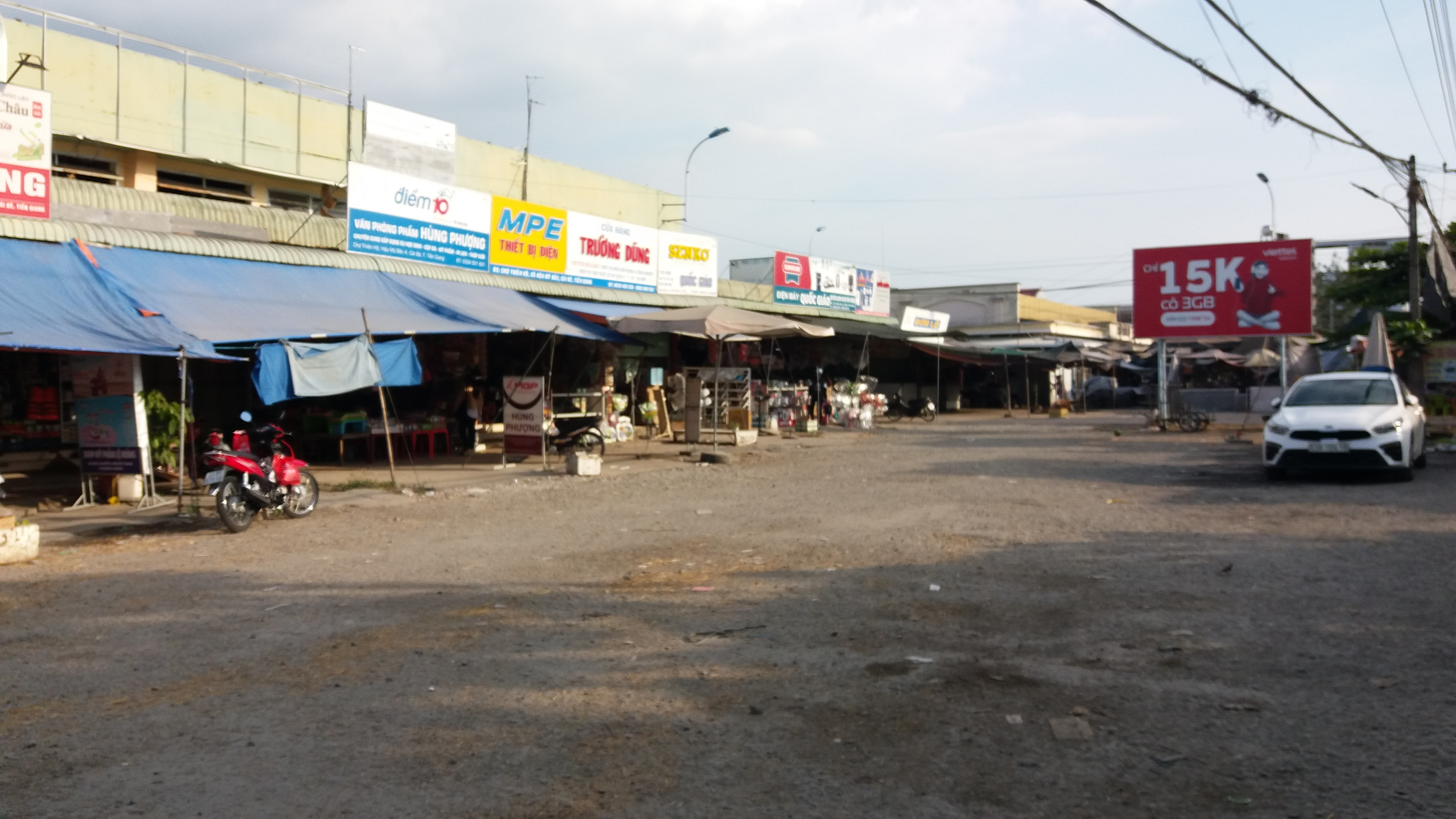
- Thiên Hộ market
- Interactive map of Hậu Mỹ
- Country: Vietnam
- Province: Đồng Tháp
- Establish: June 16, 2025

Area
  - Total: 78.61 km^{2} (30.35 sq mi)

Population (2025)
  - Total: 40,097 people
  - Density: 510.1/km^{2} (1,321/sq mi)
- Time zone: UTC+07:00

Hậu Mỹ is a commune in Đồng Tháp province, Vietnam. It is one of 102 communes and wards in the province following the 2025 reorganization.

== Geography ==
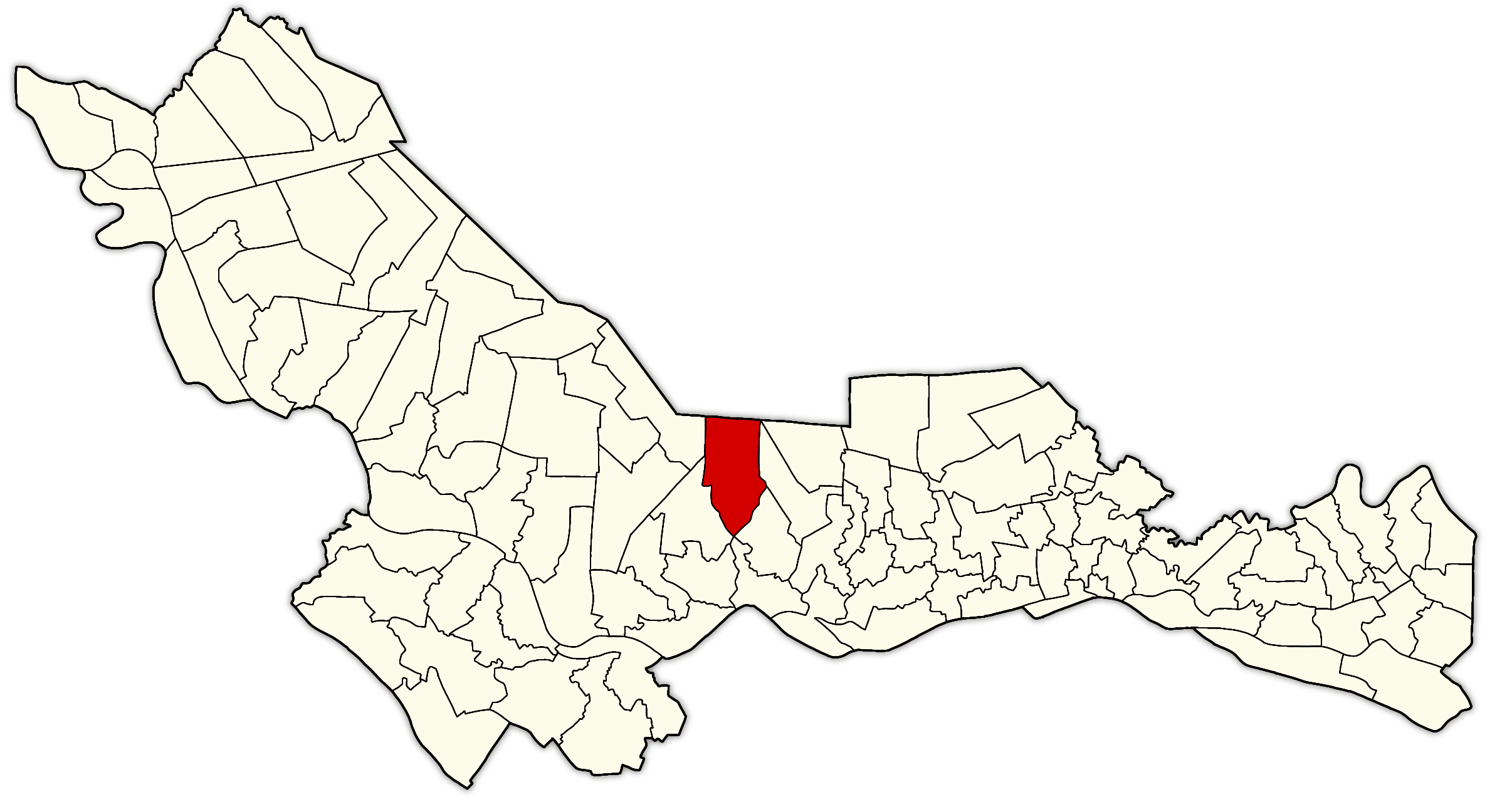
Location of Hậu Mỹ commune on Đồng Tháp province map (highlight in red).

Hậu Mỹ commune has the following geographical location:

- To the north, it borders Tây Ninh province.
- To the west, it borders Đốc Binh Kiều commune.
- To the southwest it borders Mỹ Thiện commune.
- To the southeast it borders Hội Cư commune.
- To the east, it borders Mỹ Thành commune.

== History ==
Prior to 2025, Hậu Mỹ commune was formerly Hậu Mỹ Bắc A, Hậu Mỹ Bắc B, and Hậu Mỹ Trinh communes in Cái Bè district, Tiền Giang province.

On June 12, 2025, the National Assembly of Vietnam issued Resolution No. 202/2025/QH15 on the reorganization of provincial-level administrative units. Accordingly:

- Đồng Tháp province was established by merging the entire area and population of Đồng Tháp province and Tiền Giang province.

On June 16, 2025, the Standing Committee of the National Assembly of Vietnam issued Resolution No. 1663/NQ-UBTVQH15 on the reorganization of commune-level administrative units in Đồng Tháp province. Accordingly:

- Hậu Mỹ commune was established by merging the entire area and population of Hậu Mỹ Bắc A, Hậu Mỹ Bắc B, and Hậu Mỹ Trinh communes (formerly part of Cái Bè district).
