= Mỹ Thuận Bridge =

Bridge in Vietnam

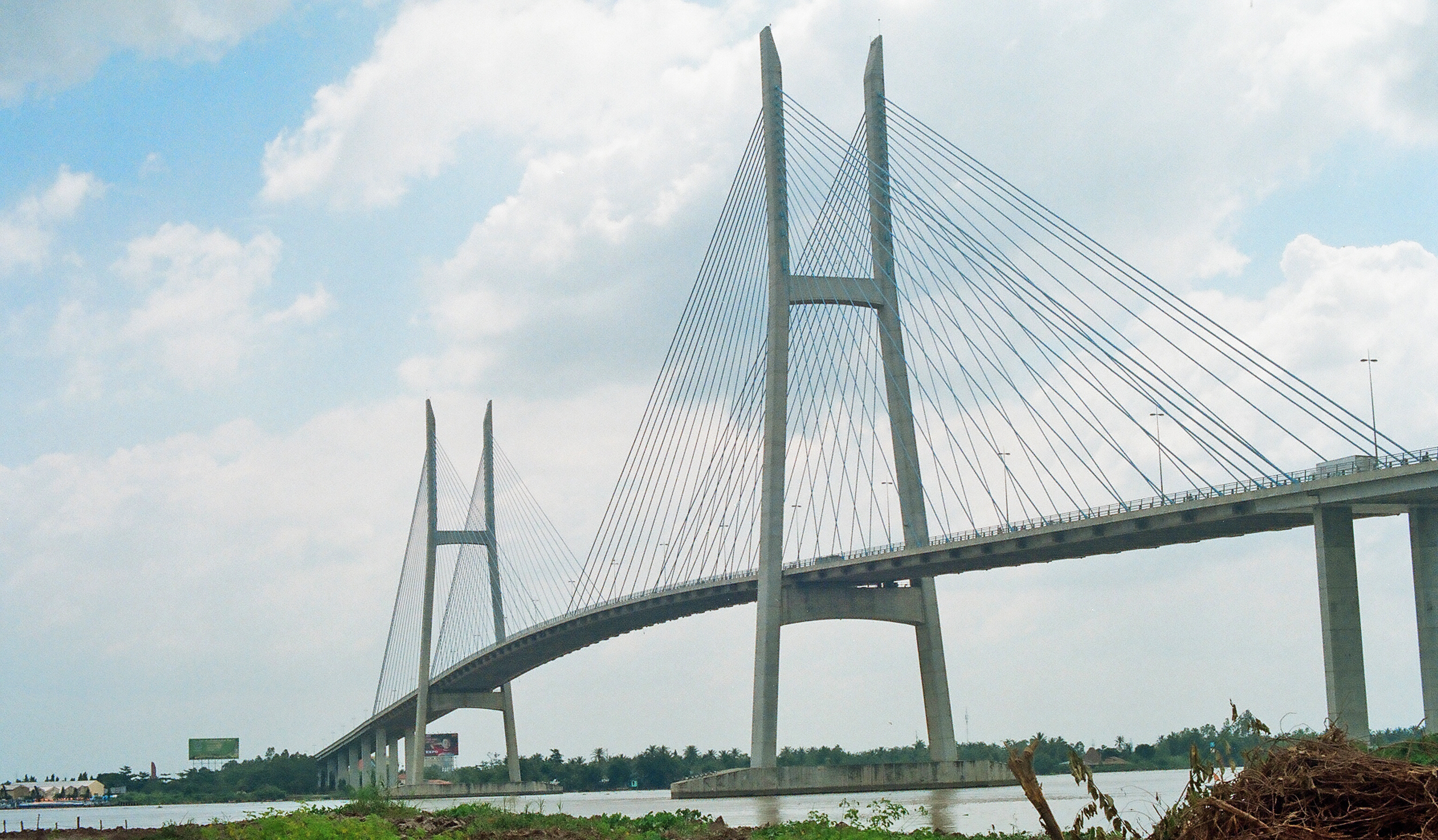
- Coordinates: 10°16′40″N 105°54′35″E
- Carries: Motor vehicles
- Crosses: Mekong river (northern arm)
- Locale: between Đồng Tháp and Vĩnh Long provinces, Việt Nam
- Official name: Cầu Mỹ Thuận

Characteristics
- Design: Cable-stayed bridge
- Total length: 1,535 m (5,036 ft)
- Width: 23.66 m (77.6 ft)
- Longest span: 350 m (1,150 ft)
- Clearance below: 37.5 m (123 ft)

History
- Construction start: July 6 1997
- Opened: May 21 2000

Location
- Interactive map of Mỹ Thuận Bridge

The Mỹ Thuận Bridge (Vietnamese: Cầu Mỹ Thuận) is a cable-stayed bridge over the Mekong river, connecting Cái Bè District of Tiền Giang Province with Vĩnh Long City of Vĩnh Long Province in Vietnam. It was developed in a joint venture between the governments of Australia and Vietnam.This is the first cable-stayed bridge ever built in Vietnam and also the first bridge connecting Tiền Giang and Vĩnh Long. The bridge was the largest overseas assistance project undertaken by the Australian government, costing A$91 million.

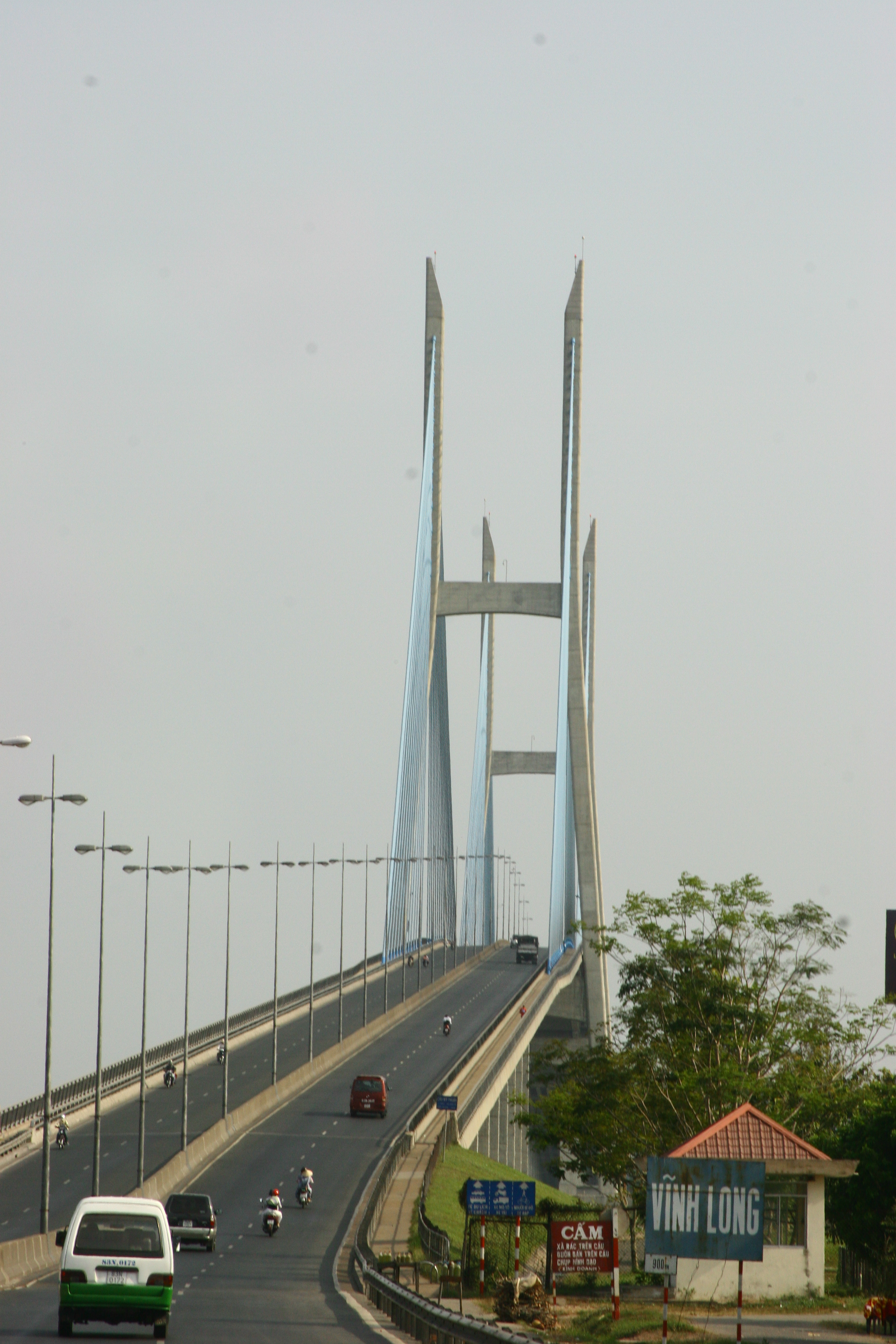
Mỹ Thuận Bridge in 2007

It was built by Baulderstone and completed in 2000.

See AusAID publication "My Thuan Bridge: Monitoring Success"

Political issues behind the bridge project are recounted by Sue Boyd, Australian ambassador to Vietnam at the time, in her autobiography.

== History ==
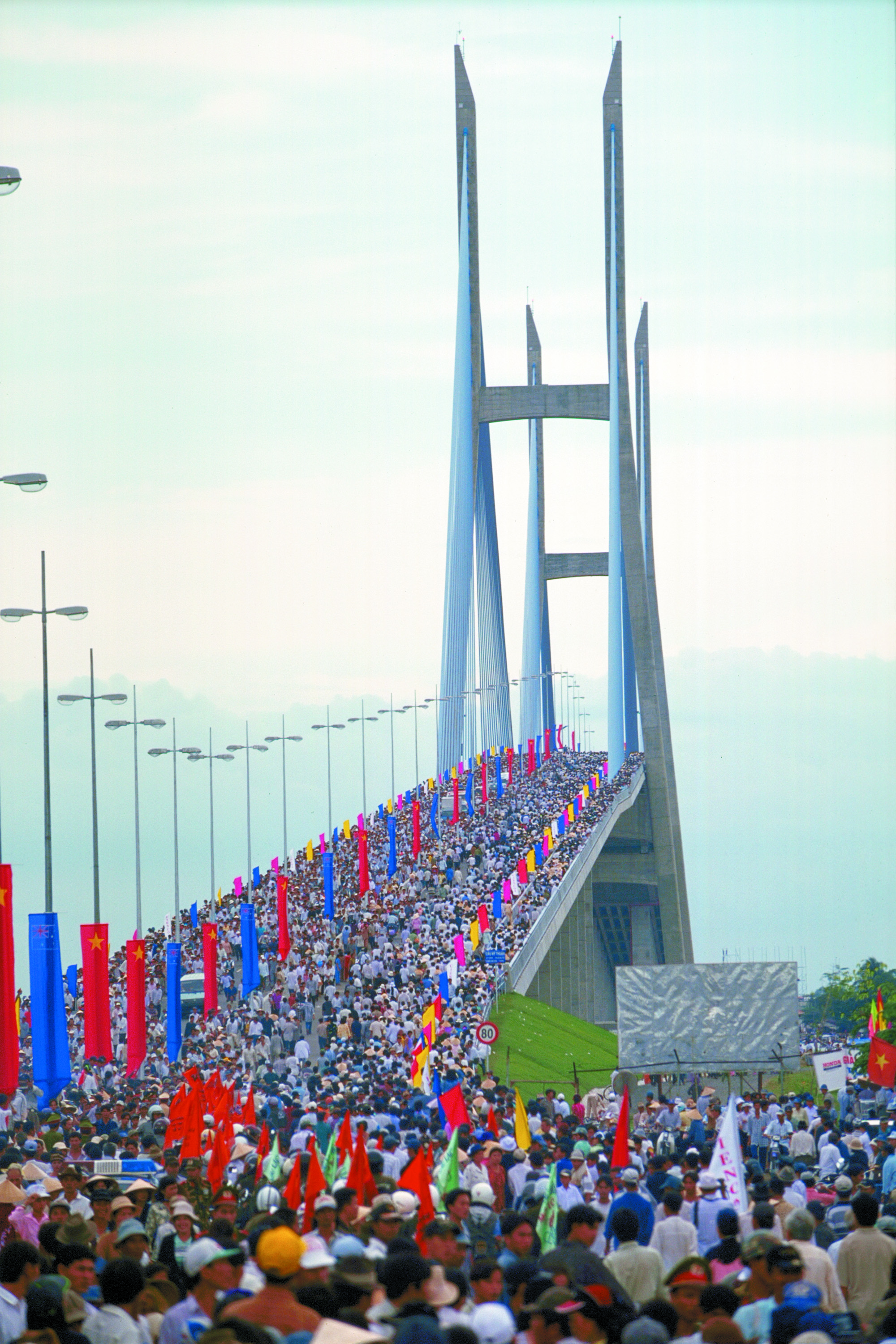
The Mỹ Thuận Bridge on its inauguration day

In 1950, the United States once intended to provide funding to the government of the State of Vietnam to build the bridge, but the attempt failed. In the mid-1960s, the Nippon Koei company (Japan) completed the design plan and was selected, but the project was canceled due to financial difficulties. According to the AusAid program of the Australian Government, the Mỹ Thuận Bridge project had a total investment capital of 90.86 million Australian dollars (equivalent to about 2,000 billion VND), in which the Australian Government funded 66%, and the Vietnamese counterpart capital was 34% — a successful collaboration. At the end of 2023, Vietnam inaugurated the Mỹ Thuận 2 Bridge, located 350 meters upstream from the existing Mỹ Thuận Bridge, connecting the two expressways Trung Lương – Mỹ Thuận and Mỹ Thuận – Cần Thơ with a total investment for the bridge and its approach roads of 5,003 billion VND.

== Location and strategic role ==
The My Thuan Bridge is located on National Highway 1A, approximately 148 kilometers south of Ho Chi Minh City, crossing the Tien River, a major branch of the Mekong River. The bridge connects the provinces of Tien Giang and Vinh Long, serving as a critical gateway between the Mekong Delta and the southern economic centers of Vietnam, especially Ho Chi Minh City.

Before its construction, transportation across the river relied heavily on the My Thuan ferry, which caused significant delays and limited the movement of goods and people. The opening of the bridge significantly reduced travel time, lowered transportation costs, and improved logistical efficiency, thereby fostering regional economic and social development.

With its strategic location, the My Thuan Bridge plays a vital role in national infrastructure connectivity, contributing to poverty reduction, agricultural and industrial growth, and enhanced access to healthcare and education for millions of people in the Mekong Delta. The bridge has become a symbol of international cooperation and sustainable development in Vietnam.

== Construction and technical features ==
The My Thuan Bridge was constructed as a joint project between the Government of Vietnam and the Government of Australia, with a total cost of A$90 million, making it Australia's largest development aid project at the time. Construction began in the late 1990s and the bridge was officially opened in May 2000.

The project placed a strong emphasis on capacity building and skills transfer. Around 1,500 Vietnamese workers participated in the project, and 45% of the construction work was carried out by Vietnamese contractors. Over 500 construction workers received hands-on training during the building process, while 60 engineers underwent formal training in bridge design, planning, and management both in Vietnam and Australia. These efforts contributed significantly to Vietnam’s long-term infrastructure development capacity.

The My Thuan Bridge is a cable-stayed bridge, notable for its scale and engineering significance. Its main technical specifications include:

- Total bridge length: 1,560 meters
- Length of main bridge structure: 600 meters
- Main span: 350 meters
- Approach spans: 480 meters on each side
- Width of deck: 24 meters
- Tower height above high water level: 120 meters
- Navigation clearance: 37.5 meters
- Maximum river depth at tower location: 26 meters

The bridge was designed to accommodate four lanes of traffic, along with space for pedestrians and bicycles. Its completion marked a significant milestone in improving connectivity in the Mekong Delta region and reducing dependency on ferry services across the Tien River.
