= Thạnh Hưng =

- Commune
- Interactive map of Thạnh Hưng
- Coordinates: 9°57′13″N 105°20′34″E
- Country: Vietnam
- Region: Mekong Delta
- Province: An Giang
- Administrative headquarters: Thạnh Đông Hamlet

Area
  - Total: 142.54 km^{2} (55.04 sq mi)

Population (31 December 2024)
  - Total: 46,773
  - Density: 328/km^{2} (850/sq mi)
- Website: thanhhung.angiang.gov.vn

Thạnh Hưng is a commune in An Giang province, Vietnam.

On 16 June 2025, the National Assembly of Vietnam adopted Resolution No. 203/2025/QH15 amending and supplementing several articles of the Constitution of the Socialist Republic of Vietnam. Under the resolution, district-level administrative units nationwide ceased to operate from 1 July 2025.

The Standing Committee of the National Assembly of Vietnam issued Resolution No. 1654/NQ-UBTVQH15 on the arrangement of commune-level administrative units in An Giang province in 2025. Under the resolution, the entire area and population of Thạnh Hưng, Thạnh Lộc, and Thạnh Phước communes, formerly part of Giồng Riềng district in Kiên Giang province, were merged to form a new commune named Thạnh Hưng.
