= An Bình, Vĩnh Long =

An Bình
- Commune
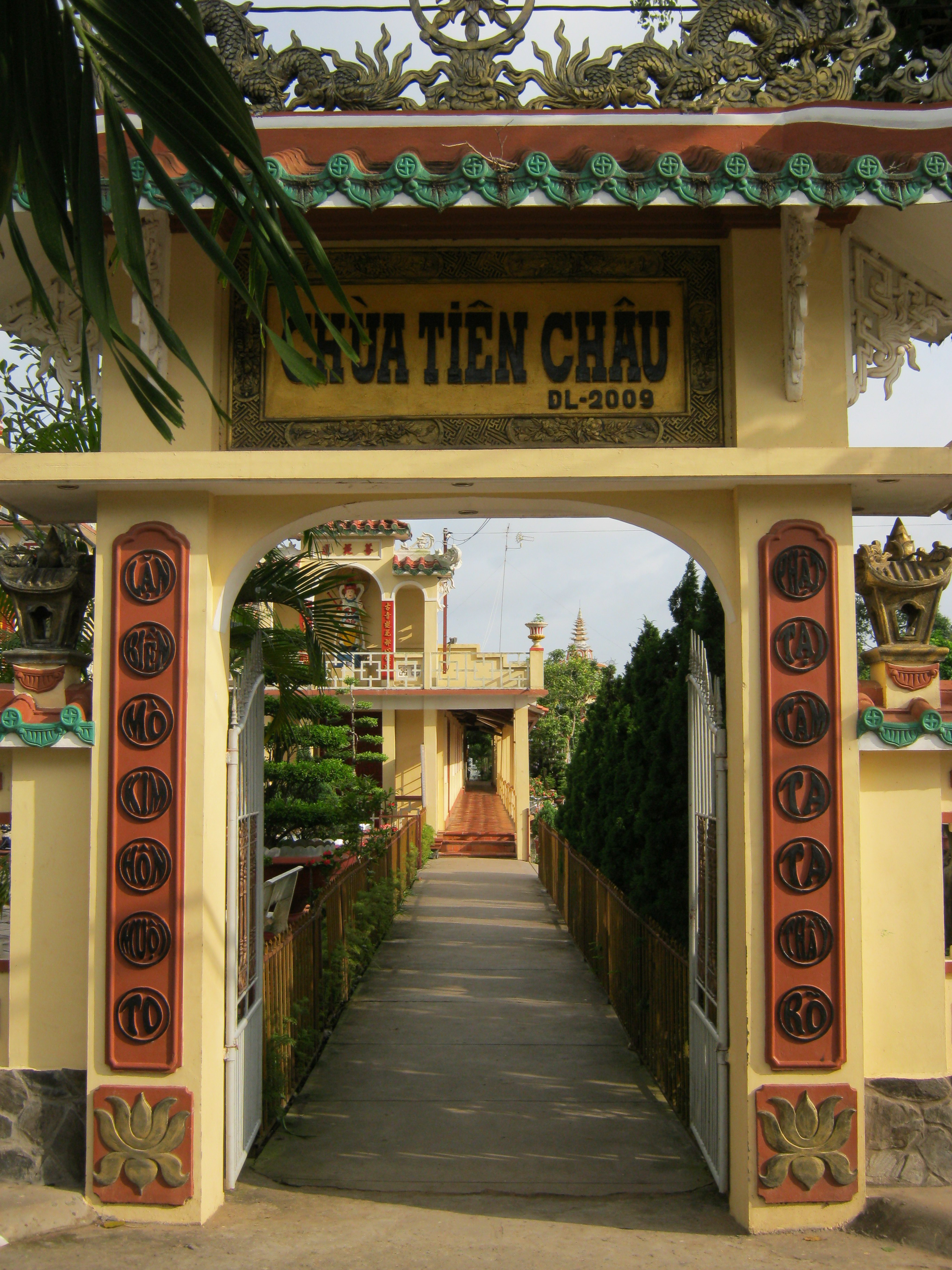
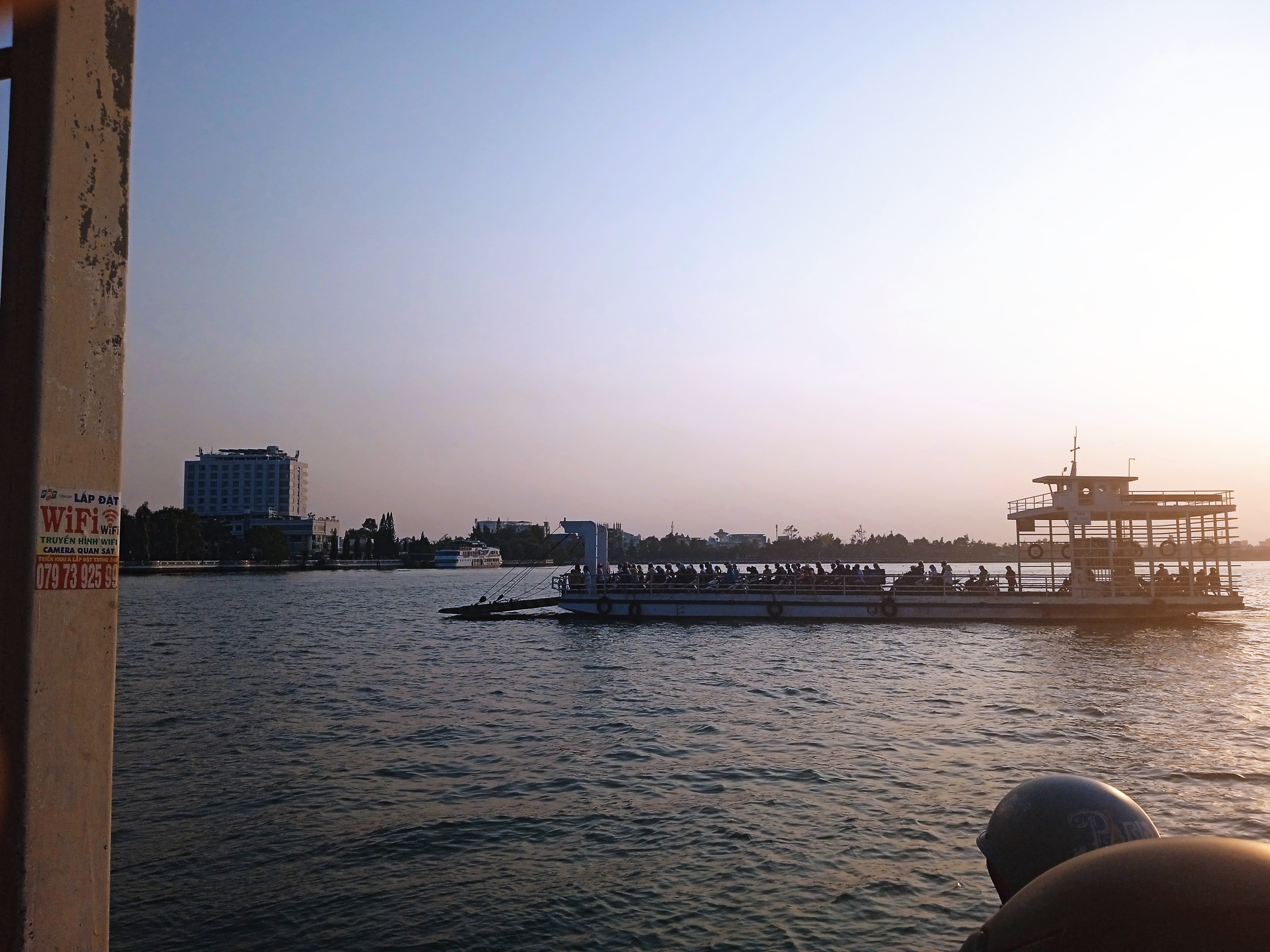
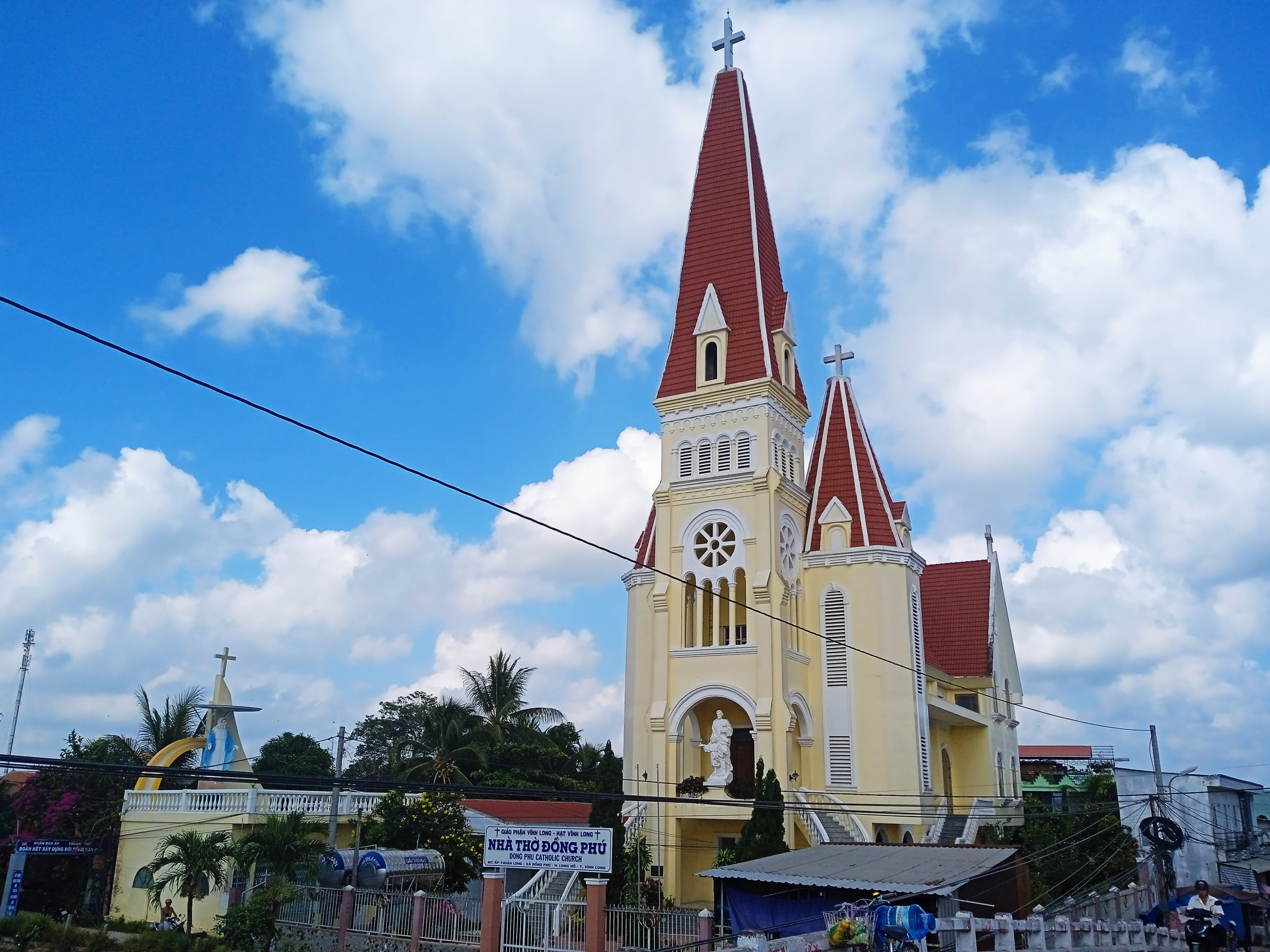
- From top to bottom, left to right: Tiên Châu pagoda, An Bình ferry, Đồng Phú church
- Interactive map of An Bình
- Country: Vietnam
- Province: Vĩnh Long
- Establish: June 16, 2025
- People's Committee: Bình Thuận 2 hamlet, An Bình commune, Vĩnh Long province.

Area
  - Total: 61.84 km^{2} (23.88 sq mi)

Population (2025)
  - Total: 51,382 people
  - Density: 830.9/km^{2} (2,152/sq mi)
- Time zone: UTC+07:00

An Bình is a commune in Vĩnh Long province, Vietnam. It is one of 124 communes and wards in the province following the 2025 reorganization.

== Geography ==
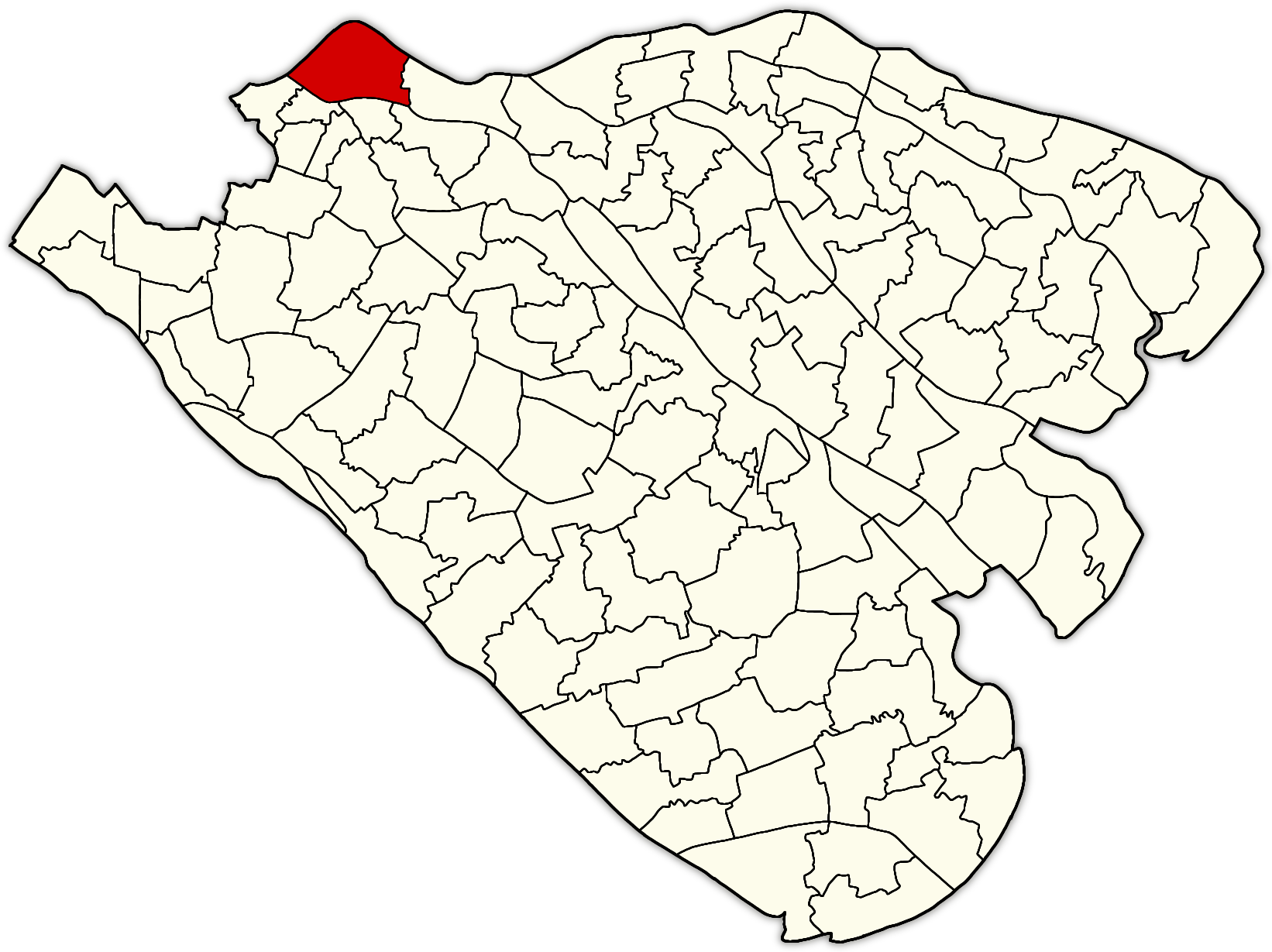
Location of An Bình commune in Vĩnh Long province map (highlight in red).

An Bình commune is located in the northern part of Vĩnh Long province, corresponding to An Bình island. The commune has the following geographical location:

- To the west and north, it borders Đồng Tháp province.
- To the east, it borders Phú Phụng commune.
- To the south, it borders wards: Tân Ngãi, Long Châu, Thanh Đức and Nhơn Phú commune.

== History ==
Prior to 2025, An Bình commune consisted of the communes of Hòa Ninh, Bình Hòa Phước, Đồng Phú, and An Bình commune in Long Hồ district, Vĩnh Long province.

On June 12, 2025, the National Assembly of Vietnam issued Resolution No. 202/2025/QH15 on the reorganization of provincial-level administrative units. Accordingly:

- Vĩnh Long province was established by merging the entire area and population of Bến Tre province, Vĩnh Long province and Trà Vinh province.

On June 16, 2025, the Standing Committee of the National Assembly of Vietnam issued Resolution No. 1684/NQ-UBTVQH15 on the reorganization of commune-level administrative units in Vĩnh Long province. Accordingly:

- An Bình commune was established by merging the entire area and population of An Bình commune, Bình Hòa Phước commune, Đồng Phú commune and Hòa Ninh commune (formerly part of Long Hồ district).
