= An Bình Island =

An Bình Island Cù lao An Bình
- River island
- Location within Vietnam
- Coordinates: 10°17′37.5″N 105°58′55.7″E
- Country: Vietnam
- Province: Vĩnh Long Province
- Commune: An Bình

Area
  - Total: 60 km^{2} (23 sq mi)

An Bình Island (Vietnamese: cù lao An Bình) is a river island located on the Tiền River and Cổ Chiên River in Vĩnh Long Province, southern Vietnam. The island covers an area of about 60 km².

== Tourism ==
An Bình Island is a popular destination for ecotourism in the Mekong Delta. The island attracts visitors with its orchards, riverside landscapes, and traditional village life.

=== Historical and Religious Sites ===
- Cai Cường Ancient House was built in 1885. The house is a blend of Vietnamese and French architecture. It belonged to the family of Mr. Phạm Văn Bốn, who was commonly known by the locals as Cai Cường (Corporal Cường).
- Tien Chau Pagoda is an ancient Buddhist temple. Built in 1750, it is the oldest temple in Vĩnh Long Province.

=== Ecotourism Areas ===
The Vinh Sang Ecotourism Area offers activities such as rowing boats through canals, fishing, and observing local wildlife. Recreational games and cultural performances are also organized for visitors.
