= Cái Bè district =

Cái Bè district Huyện Cái Bè
- District
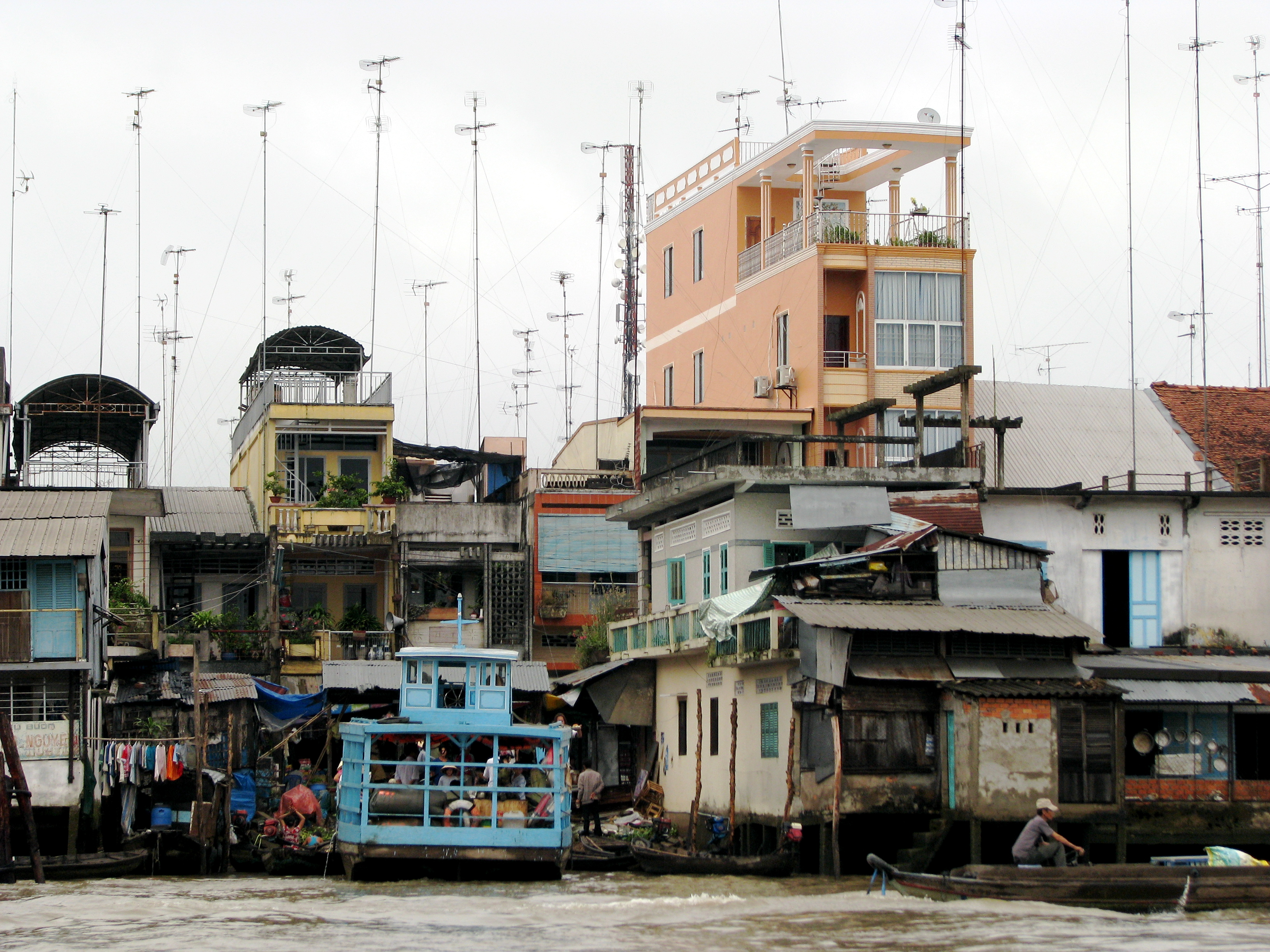
- Cái Bè District, Tien Giang, Vietnam

- Location within Vietnam
- Coordinates: 10°20′N 106°02′E
- Country: Vietnam
- Region: Mekong Delta
- Province: Tiền Giang province
- Dissolution: 1 july 2025
- Capital: Cái Bè

Area
  - Total: 421 km^{2} (163 sq mi)

Population (2018)
  - Total: 291,627
- Time zone: UTC+7 (UTC + 7)

Cái Bè is a former district of Tiền Giang province in Vietnam. Along the river, there are docks that handle passengers and goods, and the floating market. Cái Bè is the north shore of Mỹ Thuận bridge, the gateway to the city of Vĩnh Long and the Cửu Long River Delta.

The population in 2020 was 293,454 people, with a population density of 698 people per square kilometer.

== Geographical location ==
Cái Bè is located in the western part of Tiền Giang Province, on the northern bank of the Mỹ Thuận Bridge, serving as a gateway to Vĩnh Long City and the entire Mekong Delta region. The district has the following geographical borders:

- To the east: borders Cai Lậy District
- To the west: borders Cao Lãnh District and Tháp Mười District of Đồng Tháp Province
- To the south: borders Vĩnh Long City and Long Hồ District of Vĩnh Long Province, and Châu Thành District of Đồng Tháp Province
- To the north: borders Tân Thạnh District of Long An Province

== History ==
Cái Bè was originally the administrative center of Long Hồ district. The Cái Bè market was established in 1732, originally called Long Hồ Market, and is now the town of Cái Bè.

On September 8, 1870, the French colonists established the Cái Bè Inspection Division. On June 5, 1871, the Cái Bè Inspection Division was dissolved, and its territory was merged into the Mỹ Tho Inspection Division. On March 12, 1912, the French established Cái Bè District under Mỹ Tho Province, based on land that was separated from Cai Lậy District in the same province.

In March 1976, Cái Bè became a district of Tiền Giang Province and has remained so to this day.
