= Bình Phú =

Bình Phú may refer to several rural communes in Vietnam, including:

- Bình Phú: ward in Hồ Chí Minh city.
- Bình Phú: commune in Đồng Tháp province.
- Bình Phú: commune in Gia Lai province
- Bình Phú: commune in Phú Thọ province
- Bình Phú: commune in Vĩnh Long province

== Former places same name ==
- Bình Phú province: The former province, located in the South Central Coast, existed in two periods: 1890-1899; and 1913-1921 (now part of Đắk Lắk province and Gia Lai province).
- Bình Phú: commune in Thạch Thất district, Hanoi (today part of Tây Phương commune, Hanoi).
- Bình Phú: commune in Bến Tre provincial city, Bến Tre province
- Bình Phú: commune in Châu Phú district, An Giang province (today part of Châu Phú commune, An Giang province).
- Bình Phú: commune in Tân Hồng district, Đồng Tháp province (today part of Tân Hồng commune, Đồng Tháp province).
- Bình Phú: commune in Thăng Bình district, Quảng Nam province (today part of Thăng Phú, Đà Nẵng municipality).
- Bình Phú: commune in Bình Sơn district, Quảng Ngãi province (today part of Bình Tân Phú commune, Quảng Ngãi province).
- Bình Phú: commune-level town and capital of Cai Lậy district, Tiền Giang province (today part of Bình Phú commune, Đồng Tháp province).
- Bình Phú: commune in Gò Công Tây district, Tiền Giang province (today part of Phú Thành commune, Đồng Tháp province).
- Bình Phú: commune in Chiêm Hóa district, Tuyên Quang province.
