= Hồng Ngự =

Hồng Ngự is the name of the following geographical locations in Đồng Tháp province, Vietnam:

- Hồng Ngự (city), a provincial city
- Hồng Ngự, Đồng Tháp, a ward
- Hồng Ngự district, a rural district
  - Former Hồng Ngự township, dissolved in 2009 to form the two wards of An Thạnh and An Lộc of Hồng Ngự town
