= Long Phú Thuận =

- Commune
- Country: Vietnam
- Province: Đồng Tháp
- Establish: June 16, 2025

Area
  - Total: 56.57 km^{2} (21.84 sq mi)

Population (2025)
  - Total: 61,107 people
  - Density: 1,080/km^{2} (2,798/sq mi)
- Time zone: UTC+07:00

Long Phú Thuận is a commune in Đồng Tháp province, Vietnam. It is one of 102 communes and wards in the province following the 2025 reorganization.

Long Phú Thuận is one of five island communes in Dong Thap province, along with Long Khánh, Tân Long, Tân Thới, and Tân Phú Đông communes.

== Geography ==
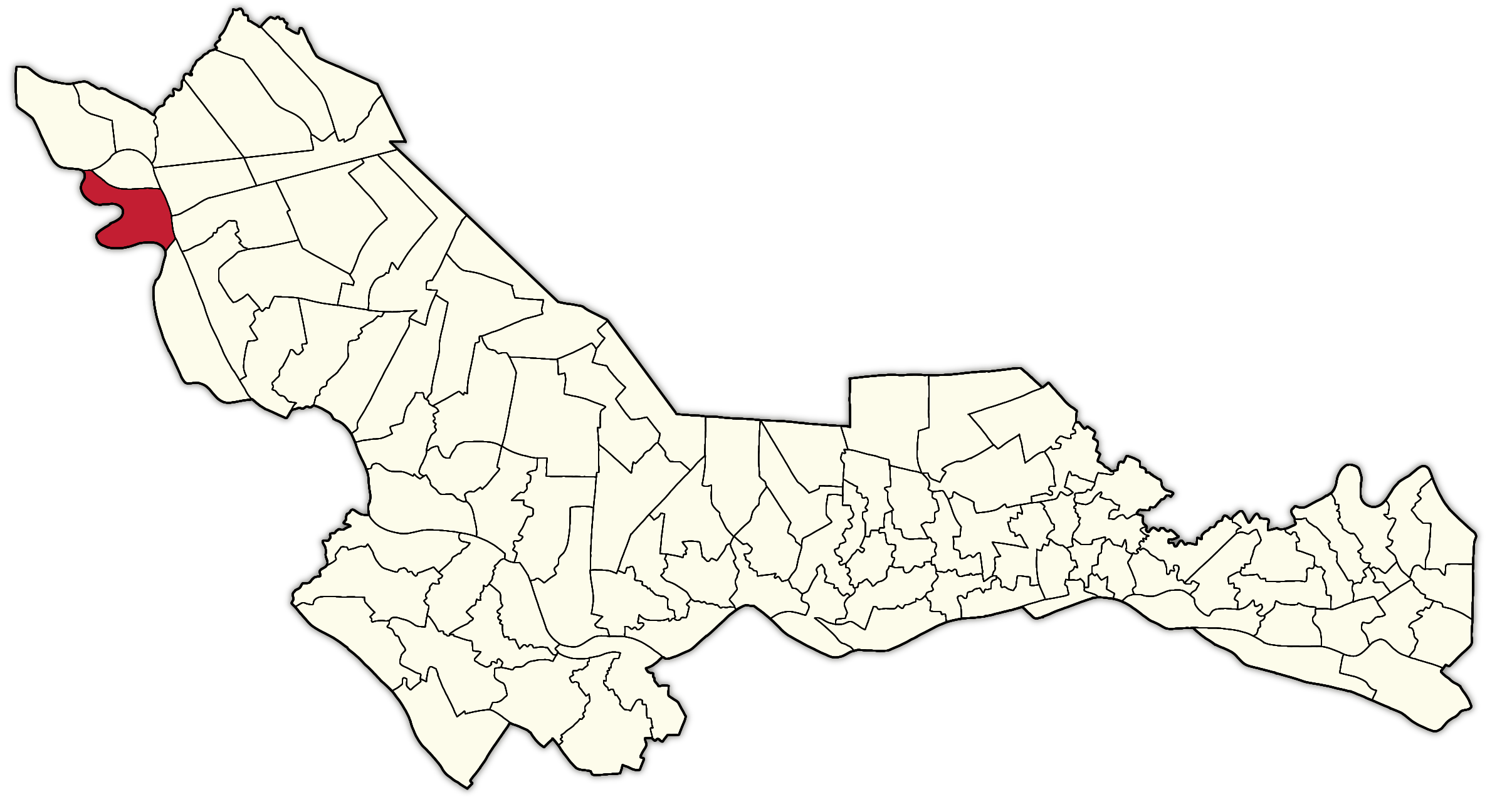
Location of Long Phú Thuận commune on Đồng Tháp province map (highlight in red).

Long Phú Thuận is an island commune located in the middle of the Tiền river, in Đồng Tháp province. The commune has a geographical location:

- To the north, it borders Long Khánh commune and Thường Phước ward.
- To the east, it borders An Bình ward and An Hòa commune.
- To the west and south, it borders An Giang province.
- To the southeast, it borders Tân Long commune.

== History ==
Prior to 2025, Long Phú Thuận commune was formerly Long Thuận, Phú Thuận A, and a part of Phú Thuận B communes in Hồng Ngự district, Đồng Tháp province.

On June 12, 2025, the National Assembly of Vietnam issued Resolution No. 202/2025/QH15 on the reorganization of provincial-level administrative units. Accordingly:

- Đồng Tháp province was established by merging the entire area and population of Đồng Tháp province and Tiền Giang province.

On June 16, 2025, the Standing Committee of the National Assembly of Vietnam issued Resolution No. 1663/NQ-UBTVQH15 on the reorganization of commune-level administrative units in Đồng Tháp province. Accordingly:

- Long Phú Thuận commune was established by merging the entire area and population of Long Thuận commune, Phú Thuận A commune, and a part of Phú Thuận B commune (formerly belonging to Hồng Ngự district).
