= An Phước =

An Phước could be one of the following locations in Vietnam:

- An Phước: commune in Đồng Nai municipality.
- An Phước: commune in Đồng Tháp province.

== Names of former places ==
- An Phước: ward in An Khê district-level town, Gia Lai province (today part of An Khê ward, Gia Lai province).
- An Phước: commune in Bảy Núi district, An Giang province (today part of Ô Lâm commune, An Giang province).
- An Phước: commune in Châu Thành district, Bến Tre province (today part of Giao Long commune, Vĩnh Long province).
- An Phước: commune in Long Thành district, Đồng Nai province (today part of An Phước commune, Đồng Nai municipality).
- An Phước: commune in Tân Hồng district, Đồng Tháp province (today part of An Phước commune, Đồng Tháp province).
- An Phước: commune in Mang Thít district, Vĩnh Long province (today part of Cái Nhum commune, Vĩnh Long province).
