= Tân Hộ Cơ =

- Commune
- Interactive map of Tân Hộ Cơ
- Country: Vietnam
- Province: Đồng Tháp
- Establish: June 16, 2025

Area
  - Total: 77.50 km^{2} (29.92 sq mi)

Population (2025)
  - Total: 25,026 people
  - Density: 322.9/km^{2} (836.3/sq mi)
- Time zone: UTC+07:00

Tân Hộ Cơ is a commune in Đồng Tháp province, Vietnam. It is one of 102 communes and wards in the province following the 2025 reorganization.

== Geography ==
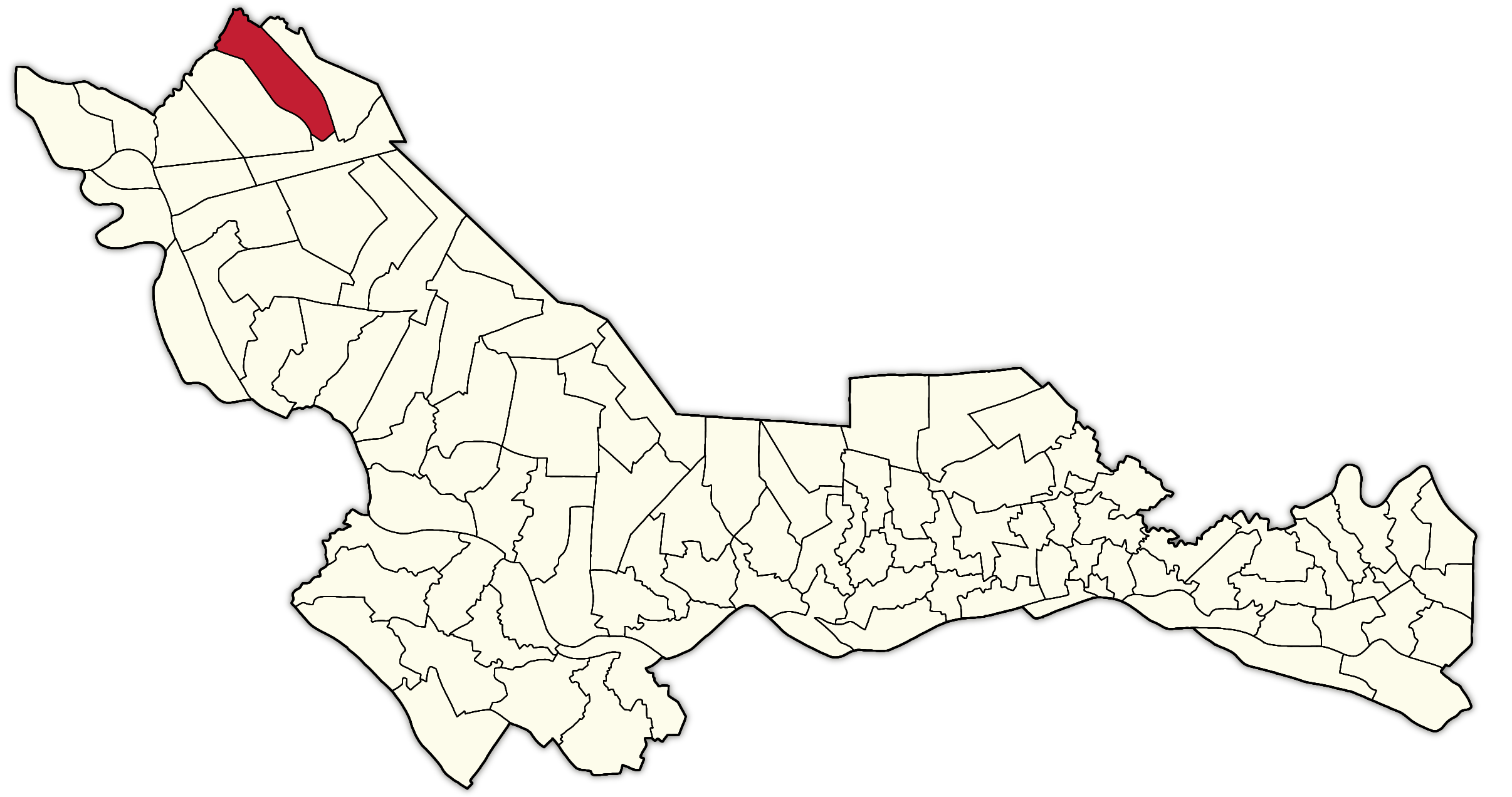
Location of Tân Hộ Cơ commune on Đồng Tháp province map (highlight in red).

Tân Hộ Cơ is a commune located in the northern part of Đồng Tháp province. It is the northern most locality of Đồng Tháp province, with the following geographical location:

- To the north, it borders the Kingdom of Cambodia.
- To the east, it borders Tân Thành commune.
- To the west, it borders Tân Hồng commune.
- To the south, it borders An Phước commune.

== History ==
Prior to 2025, Tân Hộ Cơ commune was formerly Tân Hộ Cơ commune and Tân Thành B commune in Tân Hồng district, Đồng Tháp province.

On June 12, 2025, the National Assembly of Vietnam issued Resolution No. 202/2025/QH15 on the reorganization of provincial-level administrative units. Accordingly:

- Đồng Tháp province was established by merging the entire area and population of Đồng Tháp province and Tiền Giang province.

On June 16, 2025, the Standing Committee of the National Assembly of Vietnam issued Resolution No. 1663/NQ-UBTVQH15 on the reorganization of commune-level administrative units in Đồng Tháp province. Accordingly:

- Tân Hộ Cơ commune was established by merging the entire area and population of Tân Hộ Cơ commune and Tân Thành B commune (formerly part of Tân Hồng district).
