= Thường Lạc =

- Ward
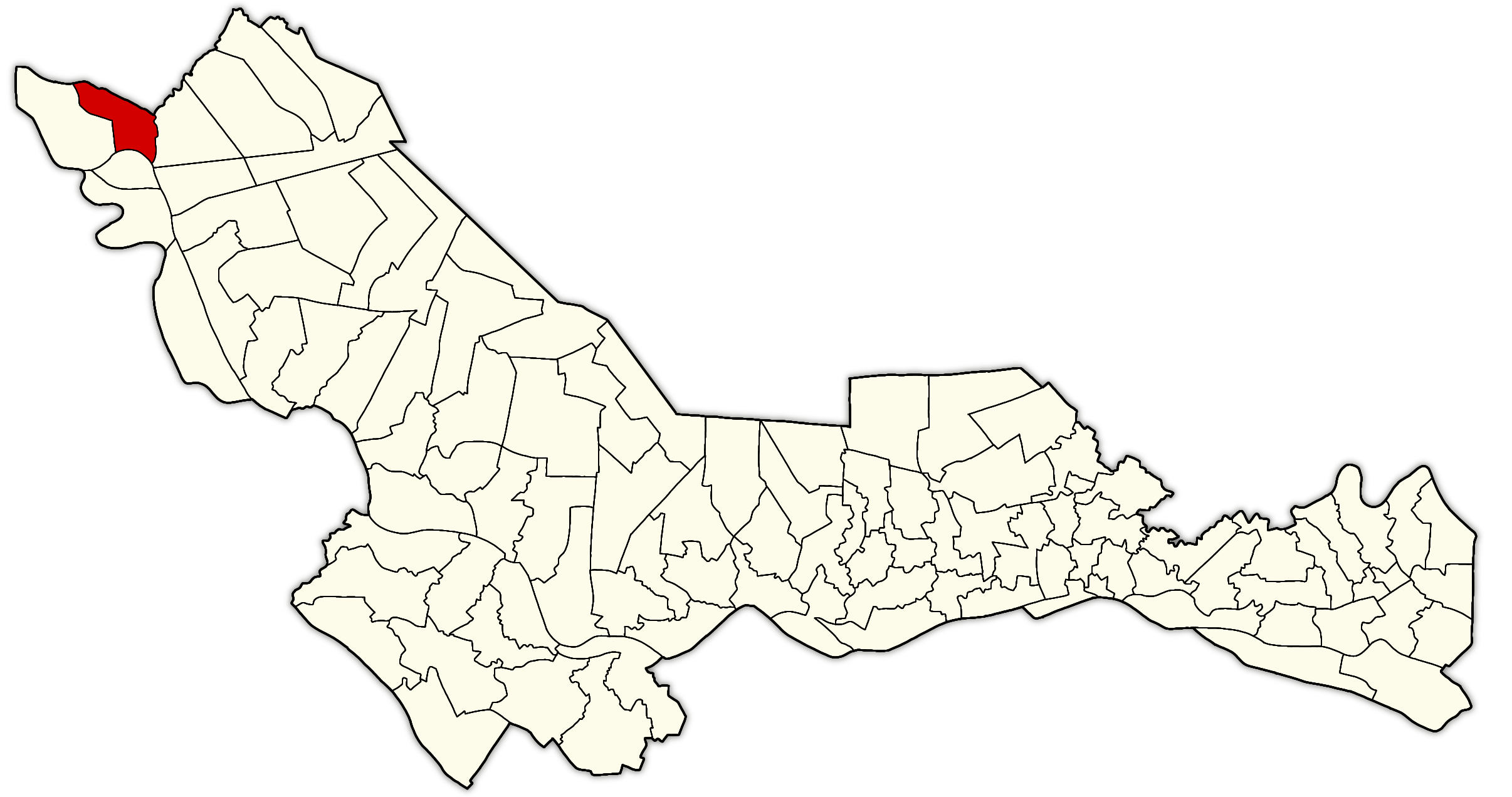
- Location of Thường Lạc ward on Đồng Tháp province map (highlight in red).

- Location within Vietnam
- Coordinates: 10.828147°N 105.311526°E
- Country: Vietnam
- Province: Đồng Tháp
- Establish: June 16, 2025

Area
  - Total: 43.74 km^{2} (16.89 sq mi)

Population (2025)
  - Total: 38,225 people
  - Density: 873.9/km^{2} (2,263/sq mi)

Thường Lạc is a ward in Đồng Tháp province, Vietnam. It is one of 102 communes and wards in the province following the 2025 reorganization.

== Geography ==
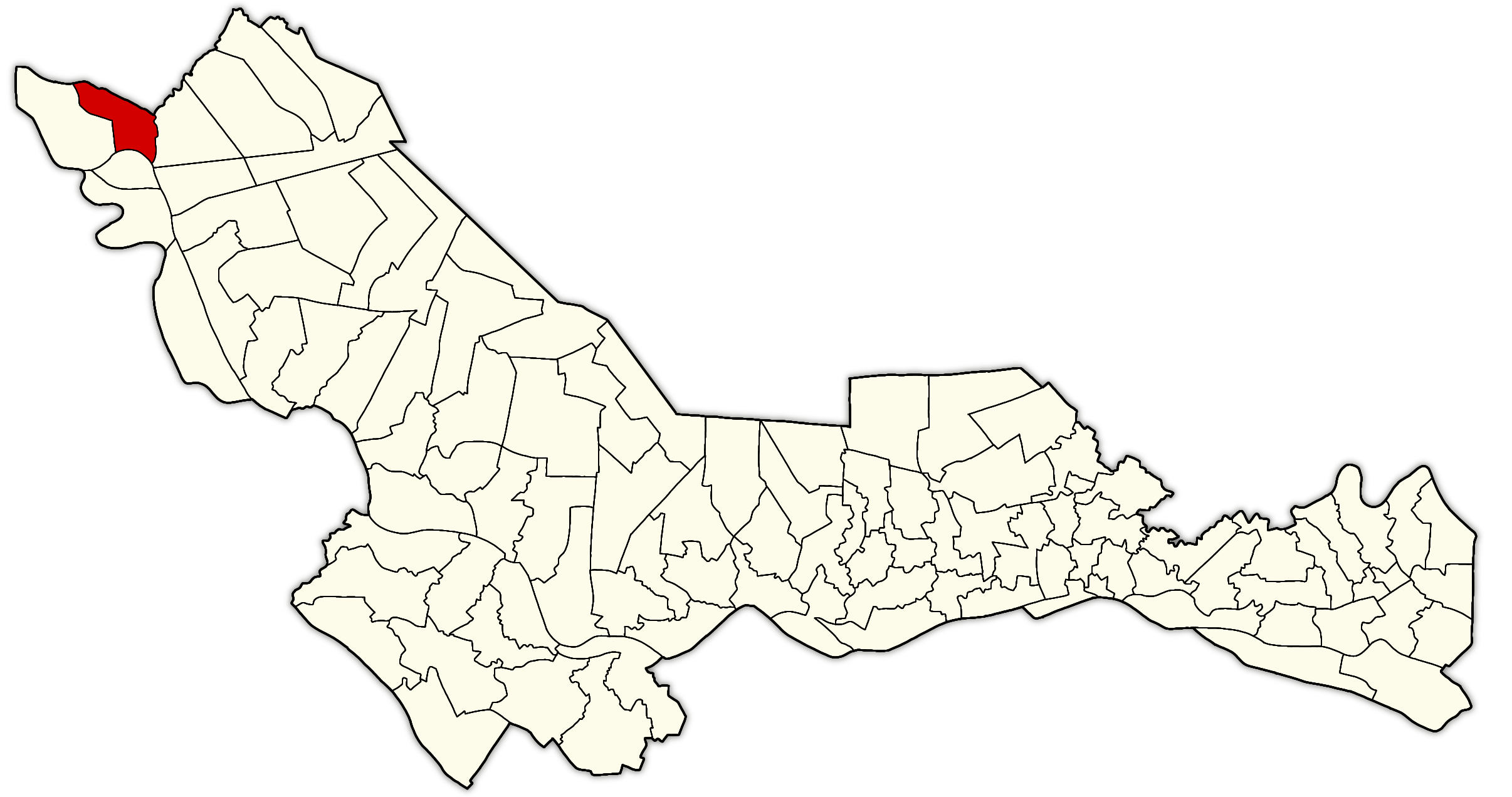
Location of Thường Lạc ward on Đồng Tháp province map (highlight in red).

Thường Lạc is a ward in Đồng Tháp province. The ward has the following geographical location:

- To the north, it borders Kingdom of Cambodia.
- To the west, it borders Thường Phước commune.
- To the east, it borders Hồng Ngự ward.
- To the south, it borders Long Khánh commune.

== History ==
Before 2025, the current Thường Lạc ward was formerly An Lạc ward (belonging to Hồng Ngự city) and Thường Lạc and Thường Thới Hậu A communes (belonging to Hồng Ngự district).

On June 12, 2025, the National Assembly of Vietnam issued Resolution No. 202/2025/QH15 on the reorganization of provincial-level administrative units. Accordingly:

- Đồng Tháp province was established by merging the entire area and population of Đồng Tháp province and Tiền Giang province.

On June 16, 2025, the Standing Committee of the National Assembly of Vietnam issued Resolution No. 1663/NQ-UBTVQH15 on the reorganization of commune-level administrative units in Đồng Tháp province. Accordingly:

- The Thường Lạc ward was established by merging the entire area and population of An Lạc ward (belonging to Hồng Ngự city) and Thường Lạc commune, Thường Thới Hậu A commune (belonging to Hồng Ngự district).
