= Long Khánh, Đồng Tháp =

Long Khánh
- Commune
- Country: Vietnam
- Province: Đồng Tháp
- Establish: June 16, 2025

Area
  - Total: 29.00 km^{2} (11.20 sq mi)

Population (2025)
  - Total: 35,884 people
  - Density: 1,237/km^{2} (3,205/sq mi)
- Time zone: UTC+07:00

Long Khánh is a commune in Đồng Tháp province, Vietnam. It is one of 102 communes and wards in the province following the 2025 reorganization.

Long Khánh is one of five island communes in Đồng Tháp province, along with Long Phú Thuận, Tân Long, Tân Thới, and Tân Phú Đông communes.

== Geography ==
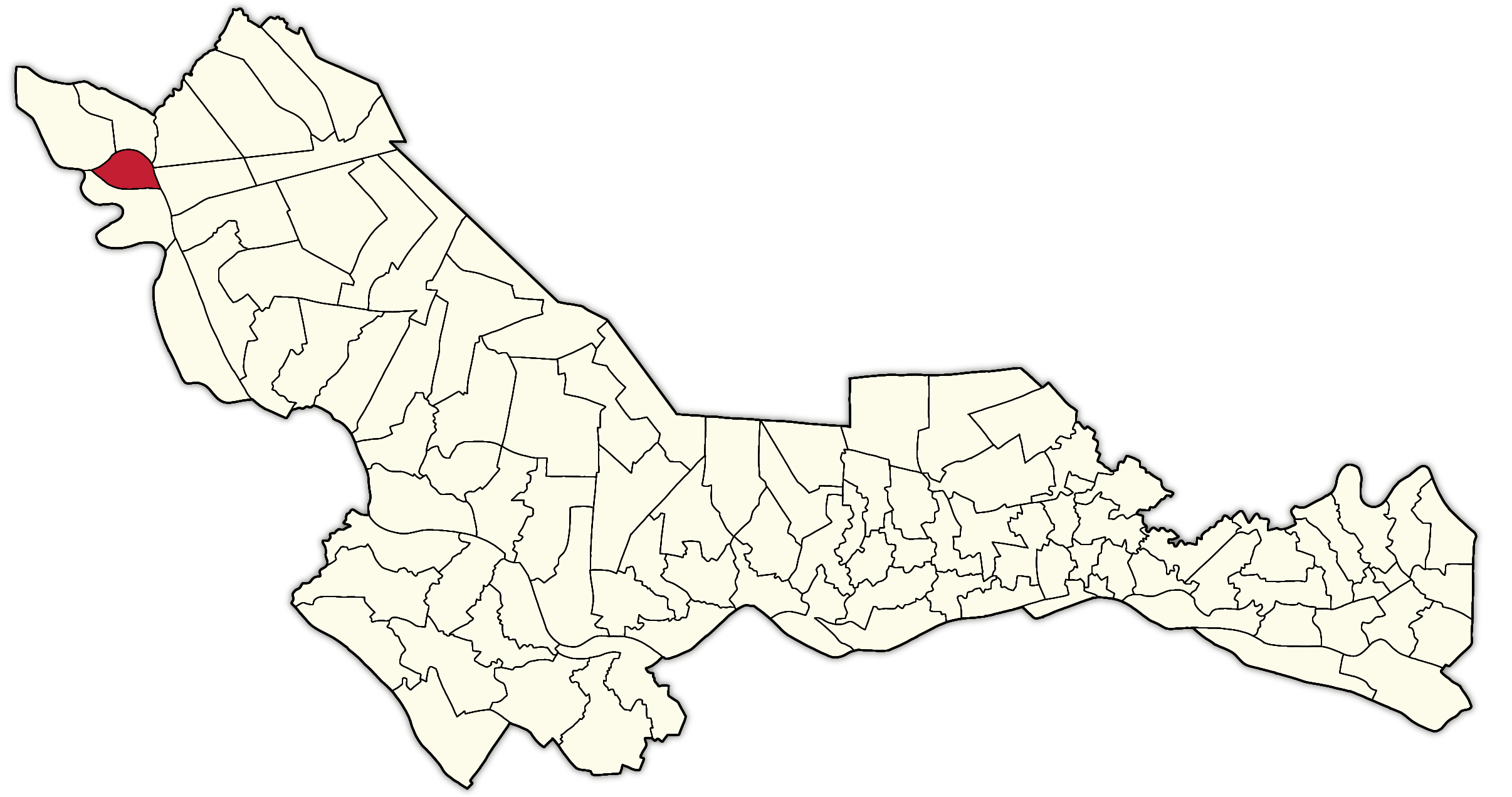
Location of Long Khánh commune on Đồng Tháp province map (highlight in red).

Long Khánh commune is an island commune located in the middle of the Tiền river, in the north of Đồng Tháp province. The commune has a geographical location:

- To the north, it borders Thường Lạc ward.
- To the northwest it borders Thường Phước ward.
- To the south and southwest, it borders Long Phú Thuận commune.
- To the east, it borders Hồng Ngự ward and An Bình ward.

== History ==
Prior to 2025, Long Khánh commune consisted of Long Khánh A and Long Khánh B communes in Hồng Ngự district, Đồng Tháp province.

On June 12, 2025, the National Assembly of Vietnam issued Resolution No. 202/2025/QH15 on the reorganization of provincial-level administrative units. Accordingly:

- Đồng Tháp province was established by merging the entire area and population of Đồng Tháp province and Tiền Giang province.

On June 16, 2025, the Standing Committee of the National Assembly of Vietnam issued Resolution No. 1663/NQ-UBTVQH15 on the reorganization of commune-level administrative units in Đồng Tháp province. Accordingly:

- Long Khánh commune was established by merging the entire area and population of Long Khánh A and Long Khánh B communes (formerly part of Hồng Ngự district).
