= Tân Thành =

Tân Thành may refer to:

- Tân Thành, Ho Chi Minh City, a ward of Ho Chi Minh City
- Tân Thành, Cà Mau, a ward of Cà Mau province
- Tân Thành, Đồng Tháp, a commune of Đồng Tháp province
- Tân Thành, Lạng Sơn, a commune of Lạng Sơn province
- Tân Thành, Lâm Đồng, a commune of Lâm Đồng province
- Tân Thành, Quảng Trị, a commune of Quảng Trị province
- Tân Thành, Tây Ninh, a commune of Tây Ninh province
- Tân Thành, Thanh Hóa, a commune of Thanh Hóa province
- Tân Thành, Thái Nguyên, a commune of Thái Nguyên province
