= Hồng Ngự, Đồng Tháp =

Hồng Ngự
- Ward
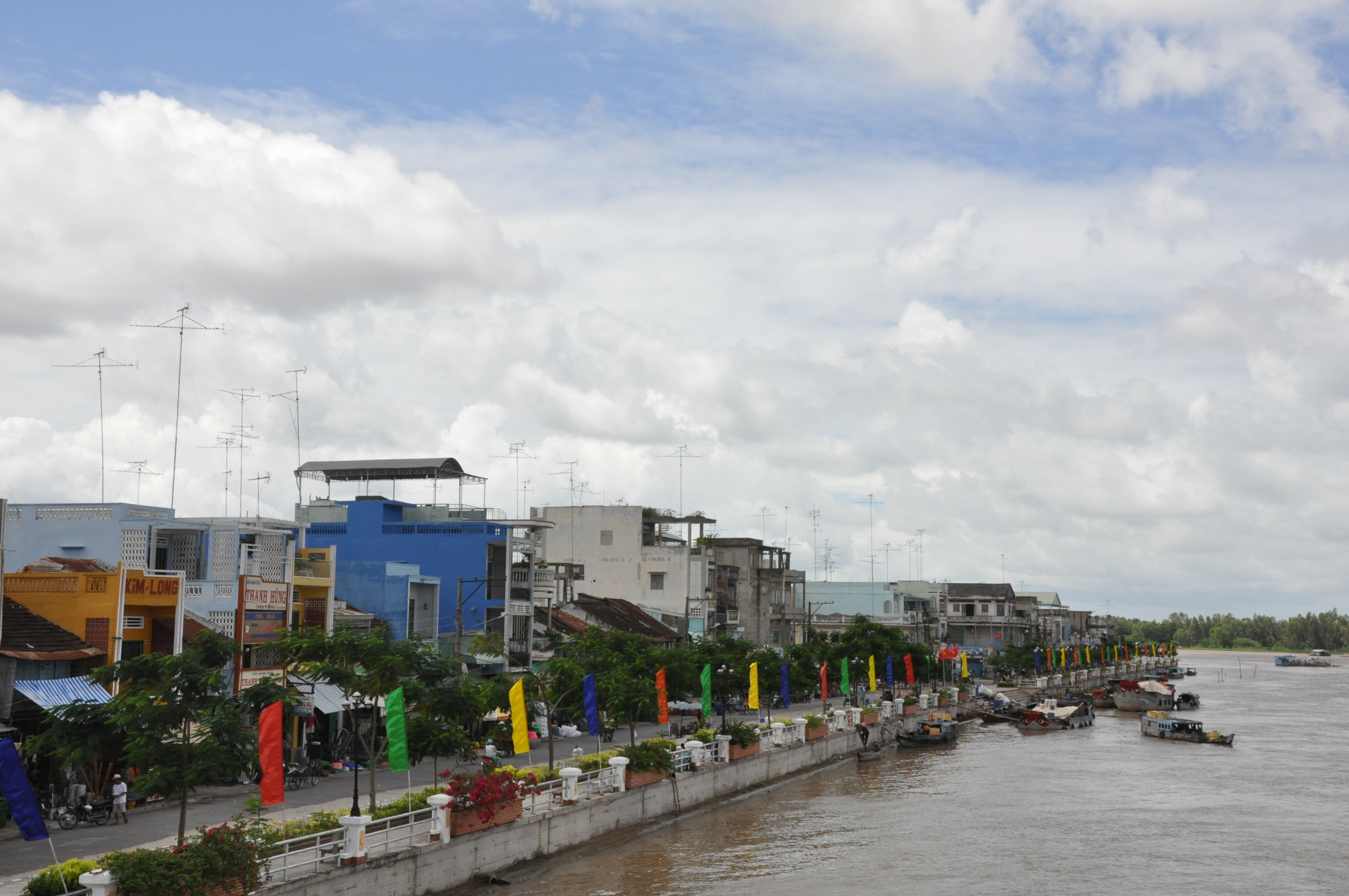
- A road on the riverside in Hồng Ngự
- Country: Vietnam
- Province: Đồng Tháp province
- Established: June 16, 2025

Area
  - Total: 64.18 km^{2} (24.78 sq mi)

Population (2025)
  - Total: 53,945
  - Density: 840.5/km^{2} (2,177/sq mi)
- Time zone: UTC+7
- Administrative code: 29955
- Website: http://hongngu.dongthap.gov.vn/

Hồng Ngự is a ward in Đồng Tháp, Vietnam. It is one of the 102 new wards, communes and special zones of the province following the reorganization in 2025.

== Geography ==
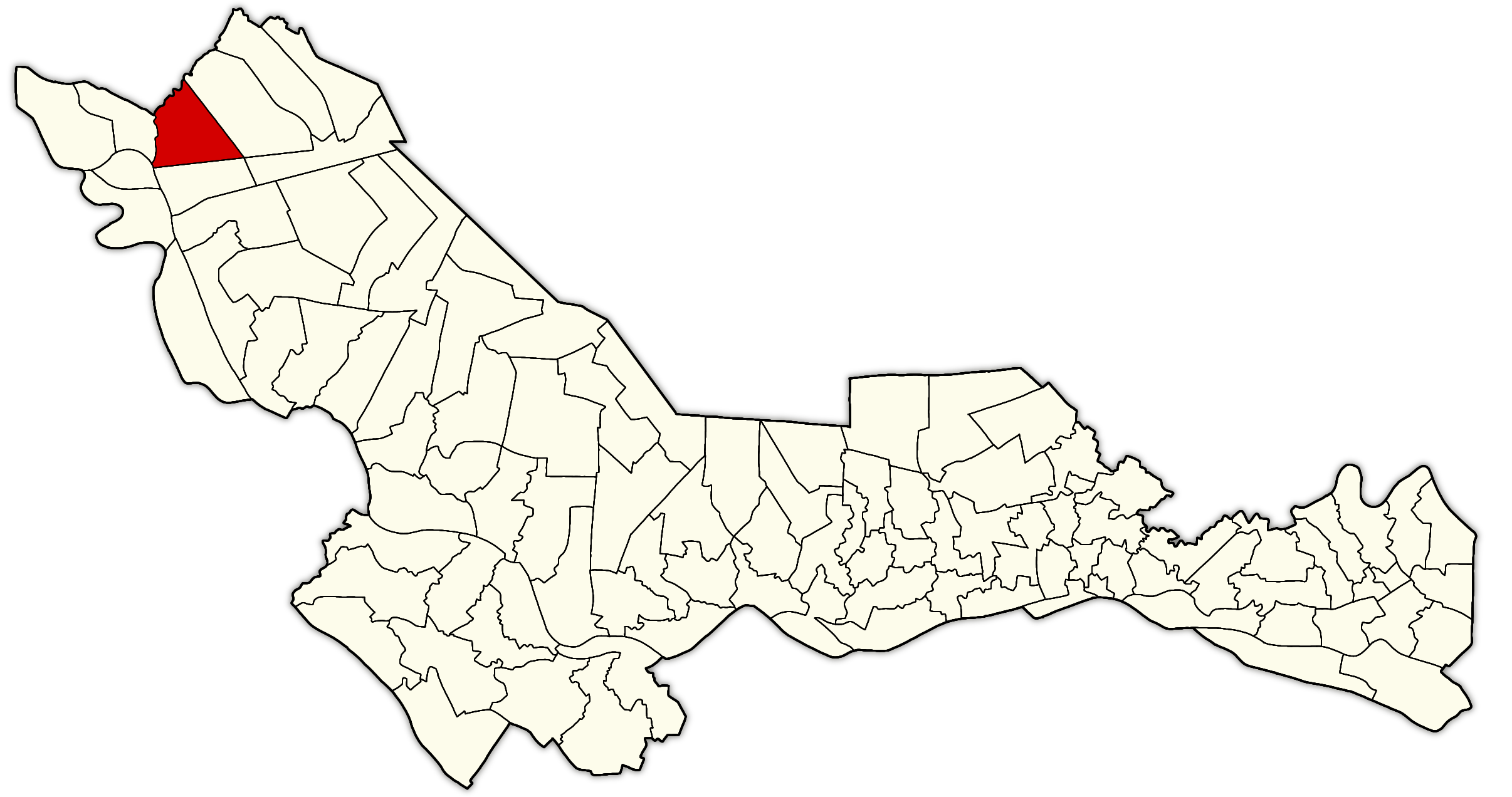
Location of Hồng Ngự ward on Đồng Tháp province map (highlight in red).

Hồng Ngự ward has the following geographical location:

- To the north, it borders Prey Veng province in Cambodia
- To the east, it borders Tân Hồng commune.
- To the west, it borders An Bình ward.
- To the north, it borders Thường Lạc ward and Long Khánh commune.

Hồng Ngự has an area of 64.18 km^{2}, population in 2025 is 53,945 people, and the population density is 840 people/km^{2}.

== History ==
On June 16, 2025, the Standing Committee of the National Assembly issued Resolution No. 1663/NQ-UBTVQH15 on the reorganization of commune-level administrative units of Đồng Tháp Province in 2025. Accordingly, the entire natural area and population of An Thạnh Ward and the communes of Bình Thạnh and Tân Hội (of Hồng Ngự City) were merged to form a new ward named Hồng Ngự.
