= An Bình, Đồng Tháp =

An Bình
- Ward
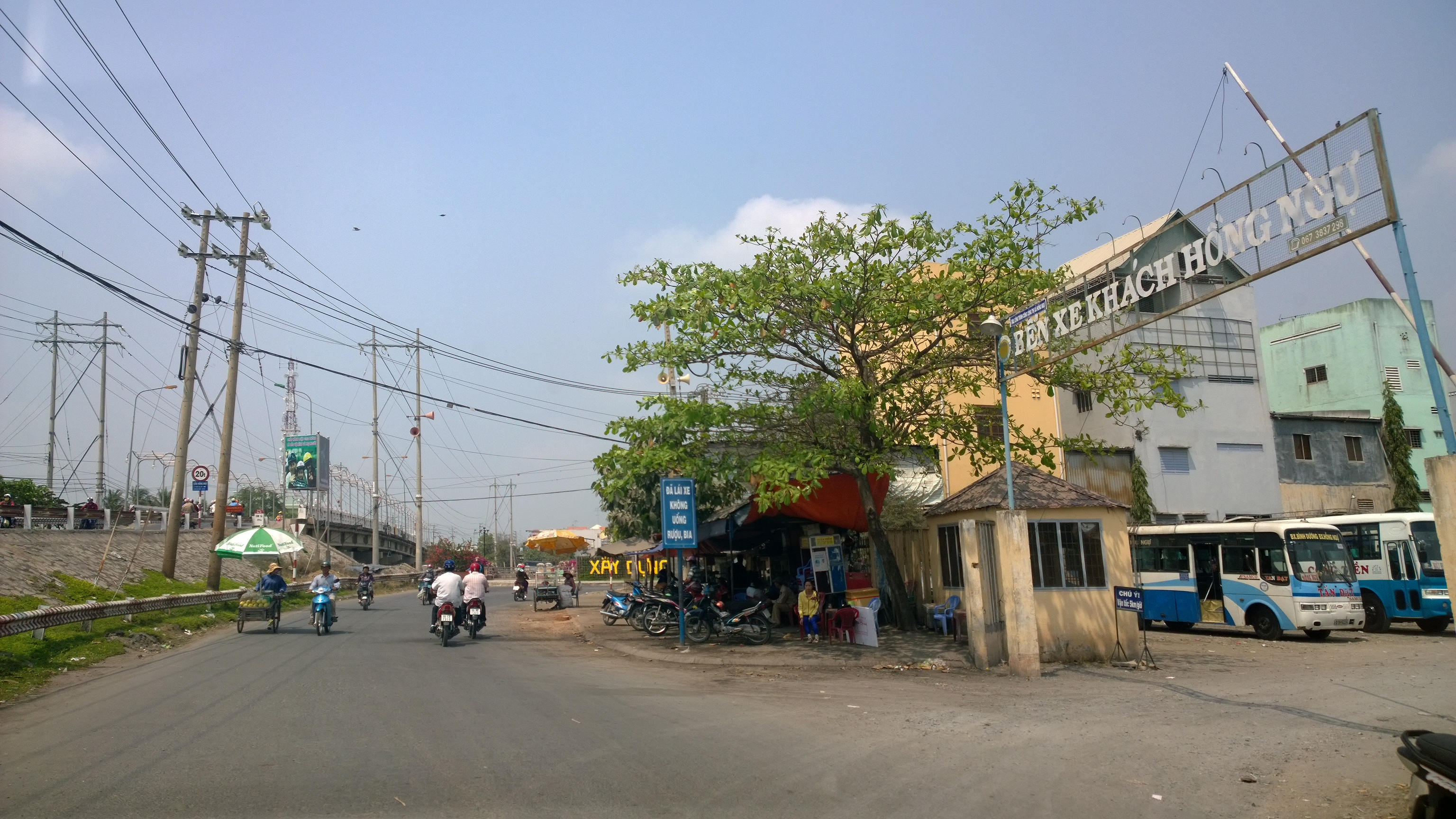
- Hồng Ngự bus station in An Bình ward.

- Location within Vietnam
- Coordinates: 10.802073749501988°N 105.34375608758681°E
- Country: Vietnam
- Province: Đồng Tháp
- Establish: June 16, 2025
- People's Committee: An Thạnh A neighborhood

Area
  - Total: 50.07 km^{2} (19.33 sq mi)

Population (2025)
  - Total: 33,314
  - Density: 665.3/km^{2} (1,723/sq mi)
- Time zone: UTC+07:00
- Administrative code: 29954

An Bình is a ward in Đồng Tháp province, Vietnam. It is one of 102 communes and wards in the province following the 2025 reorganization.

== Geography ==
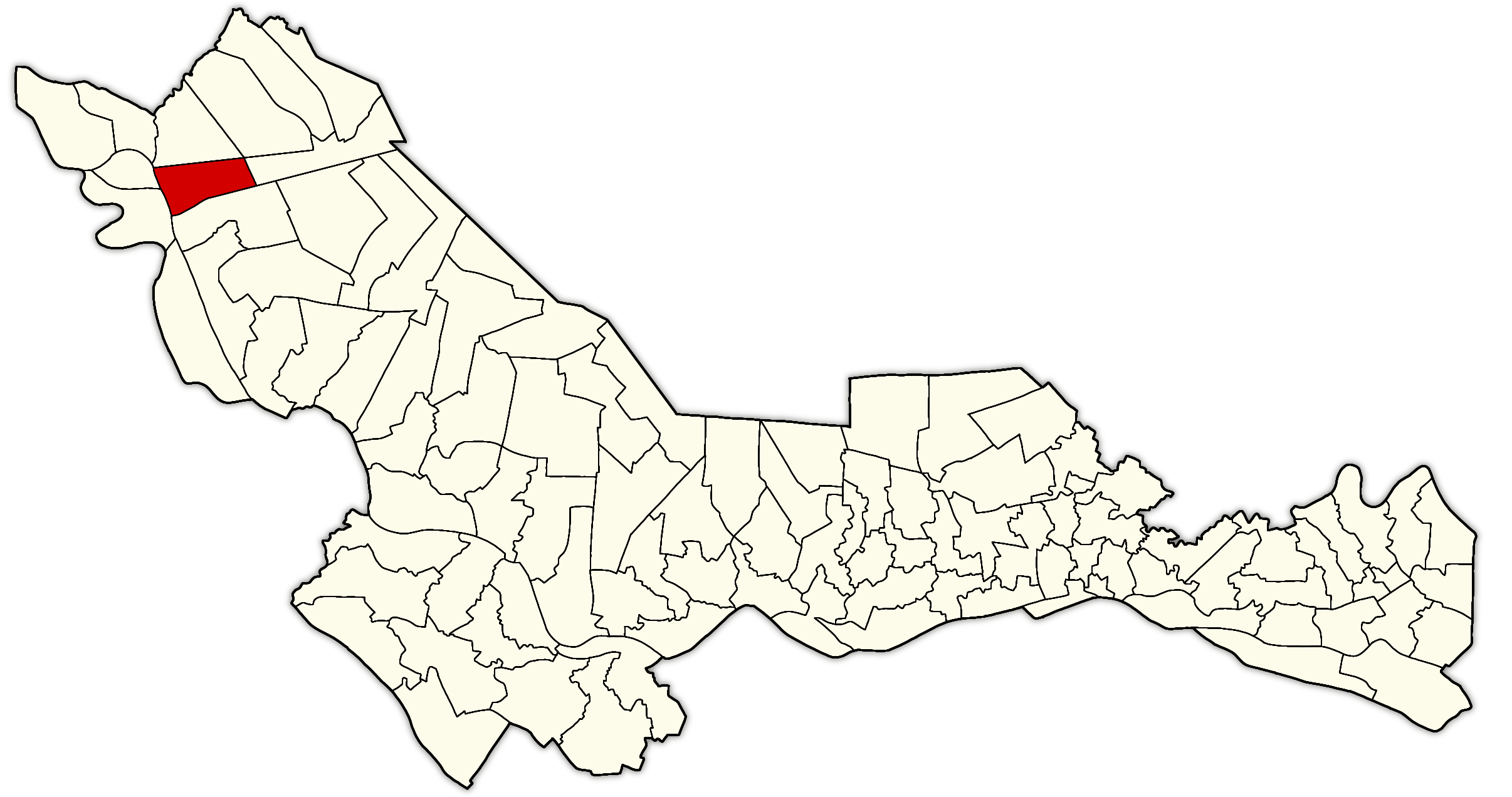
Location of An Bình ward on the Đồng Tháp province map (highlight in red).

An Bình ward has the following geographical location:

- To the east, it borders An Phước commune.
- To the west, it borders Long Khánh commune and Long Phú Thuận commune.
- To the south, it borders An Hòa commune.
- To the north, it borders Hồng Ngự ward.

== Administrative divisions ==
An Binh Ward, Dong Thap province divided into 11 neighborhoods: 1, 2, An Hòa, An Lộc, An Lợi, An Lợi A, An Phước, An Tài, An Thạnh A, An Thạnh B, An Thịnh.

== History ==
Prior to 2025, An Binh ward was formerly An Loc ward and An Binh A and An Binh B communes belonging to Hồng Ngự city, Đồng Tháp province.

On June 12, 2025, the National Assembly of Vietnam issued Resolution No. 202/2025/QH15 on the reorganization of provincial-level administrative units. Accordingly:

- Đồng Tháp province was established by merging the entire area and population of Đồng Tháp province and Tiền Giang province.

On June 16, 2025, the Standing Committee of the National Assembly of Vietnam issued Resolution No. 1663/NQ-UBTVQH15 on the reorganization of commune-level administrative units in Đồng Tháp province. Accordingly:

- An Bình ward was established by merging the entire area and population of An Lộc ward, An Bình A commune and An Bình B commune (formerly Hồng Ngự city).
