= An Phước, Đồng Tháp =

An Phước
- Commune
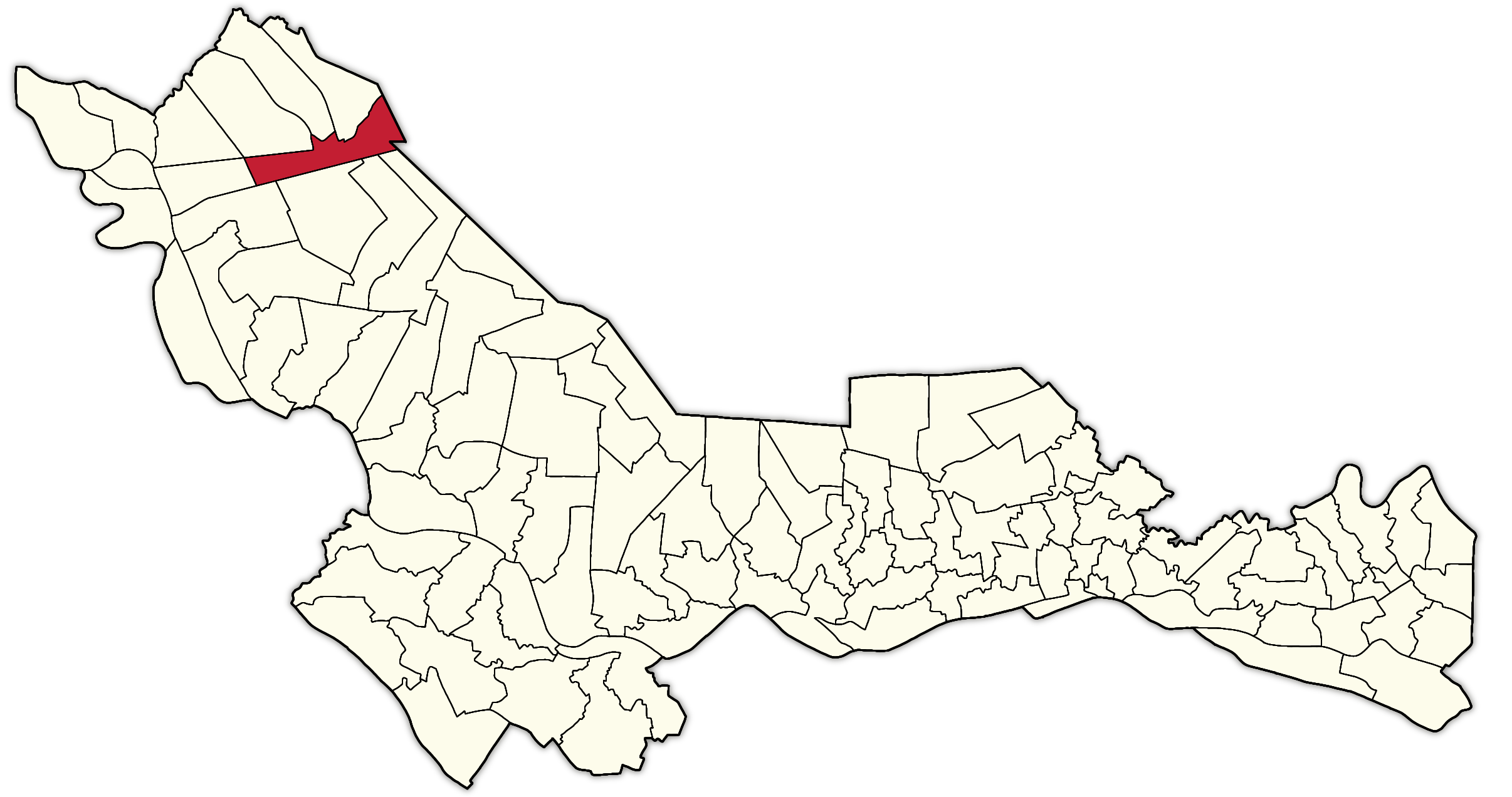
- Location of An Phước commune on Đồng Tháp province map (highlight in red)
- Country: Vietnam
- Province: Đồng Tháp
- Establish: June 16, 2025

Area
  - Total: 64.93 km^{2} (25.07 sq mi)

Population (2025)
  - Total: 23,788 people
  - Density: 366.4/km^{2} (948.9/sq mi)
- Time zone: UTC+07:00

An Phước is a commune in Đồng Tháp province, Vietnam. It is one of 102 communes and wards in the province following the 2025 reorganization.

== Geography ==
An Phước is a rural commune located in the northern part of Đồng Tháp province. The commune has the following geographical location:

- To the south, it borders Phú Cường, Tam Nông, An Hòa communes and Tràm Chim ward.
- To the west, it borders An Bình ward.
- To the north, it borders Tân Hồng, Tân Hộ Cơ, and Tân Thành communes.
- To the east, it borders Tây Ninh province.

== History ==
Prior to 2025, An Phước commune was formerly An Phước and Tân Phước communes in Tân Hồng district, Đồng Tháp province.

On June 12, 2025, the National Assembly of Vietnam issued Resolution No. 202/2025/QH15 on the reorganization of provincial-level administrative units. Accordingly:

- Đồng Tháp province was established by merging the entire area and population of Đồng Tháp province and Tiền Giang province.

On June 16, 2025, the Standing Committee of the National Assembly of Vietnam issued Resolution No. 1663/NQ-UBTVQH15 on the reorganization of commune-level administrative units in Đồng Tháp province. Accordingly:

- An Phước commune was established by merging the entire area and population of An Phước commune and Tân Phước commune (formerly part of Tân Hồng district).
