= Nguyễn Cư Trinh =

Vietnamese general

Nguyễn Cư Trinh (1716–1767): His original name is Nguyễn Đăng Nghi, Courtesy name is Cư Trinh, [Pen name] are Đạm Am, Đường Qua and Hạo Nhiên, title is Nghi Biểu Hầu (儀表侯), then was given another title Tân Minh Hầu by a King of Nguyễn dynasty. He was a famous General as well as Notable in the age of King Nguyễn Phúc Khoát and King Nguyễn Phúc Thuần. In addition, he made a great contribution to protecting the south border and expanding the border toward the South. He was renowned for his integrity, loyalty and diploma.

== Biography ==
Nguyễn Cư Trinh was born in An Hòa commune, tổng An Hòa, Hương Trà district, phủ Triệu Phong, Thuận Hóa area, now known as An Hòa ward, Huế city, Thừa Thiên-Huế Province.
