= Thường Phước =

- Ward
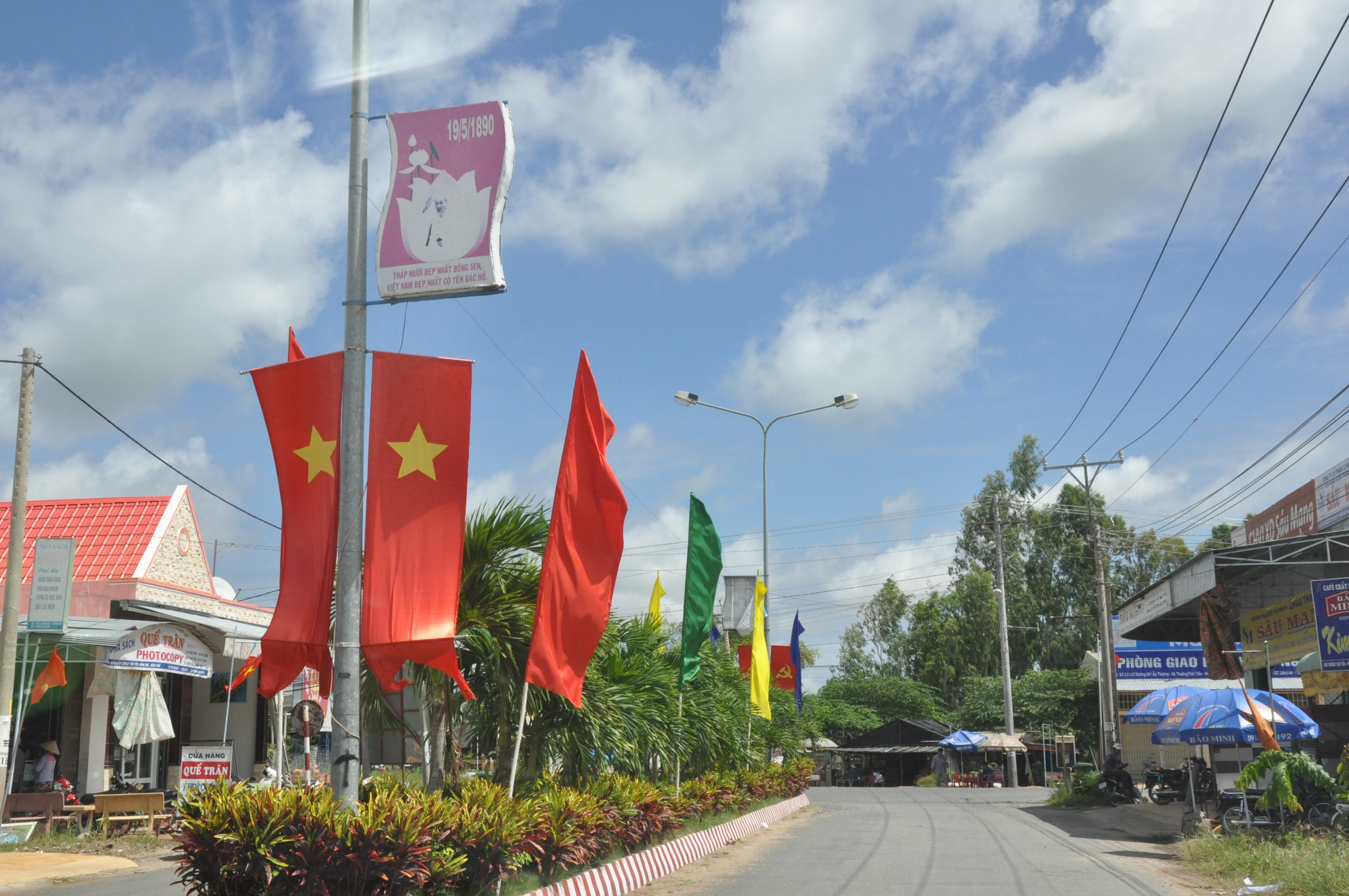
- A corner of Thường Phước ward
- Interactive map of Thường Phước
- Location within Vietnam Location within Southeast Asia Location within Asia
- Coordinates: 10°48′46″N 105°14′51″E
- Country: Vietnam
- Region: Mekong Delta
- Province: Đồng Tháp
- Establish: June 16, 2025
- Become a ward: May 11, 2026

Area
  - Total: 31.17 sq mi (80.74 km^{2})

Population (2025)
  - Total: 59,864
- Time zone: UTC+7 (UTC + 7)
- Administrative code: 29971
- Website: http://thuongphuoc.dongthap.gov.vn/

Thường Phước is a ward in Đồng Tháp province, Vietnam. This is one of 102 communes and wards in the province.

== Geography ==
Thường Phước is a ward in Đồng Tháp province. Located in the western most part of the province, the ward has the following geographical location:

- To the north it borders Kingdom of Cambodia.
- To the west, it borders An Giang province.
- To the south it borders Long Khánh commune.
- To the east, it borders Thường Lạc ward.

== Administration ==
Thường Phước is divided into 12 hamlets: 1, 2, 3, Chòm Xoài, Giồng Bàng, Mương Kinh, Mương Miễu, Phước Tiền, Thường Thới, Thượng, Trung, Trung Tâm.

== History ==
Prior to 2025, Thường Phước ward was formerly Thường Thới Tiền commune-level town, and Thường Phước 1 commune and Thường Phước 2 commune in the Hồng Ngự district, Đồng Tháp province.

On June 12, 2025, the National Assembly of Vietnam issued Resolution No. 202/2025/QH15 on the reorganization of provincial-level administrative units. Accordingly:

- Đồng Tháp province was established by merging the entire area and population of Đồng Tháp province and Tiền Giang province.

On June 16, 2025, the Standing Committee of the National Assembly of Vietnam issued Resolution No. 1663/NQ-UBTVQH15 on the reorganization of commune-level administrative units in Đồng Tháp province. Accordingly:

- Thường Phước commune was established by merging the entire area and population of Thường Thới Tiền, Thường Phước 1 and Thường Phước 2.

On May 11, 2026, the People's Council of Đồng Tháp province approved the plan to establish 11 new wards in the province. Accordingly:

- The Thường Phước ward was established based on the entire area and population of Thường Phước commune.
