= Châu Phú district =

Coordinates: 10.583°N 105.167°E

Châu Phú district Huyện Châu Phú
- District
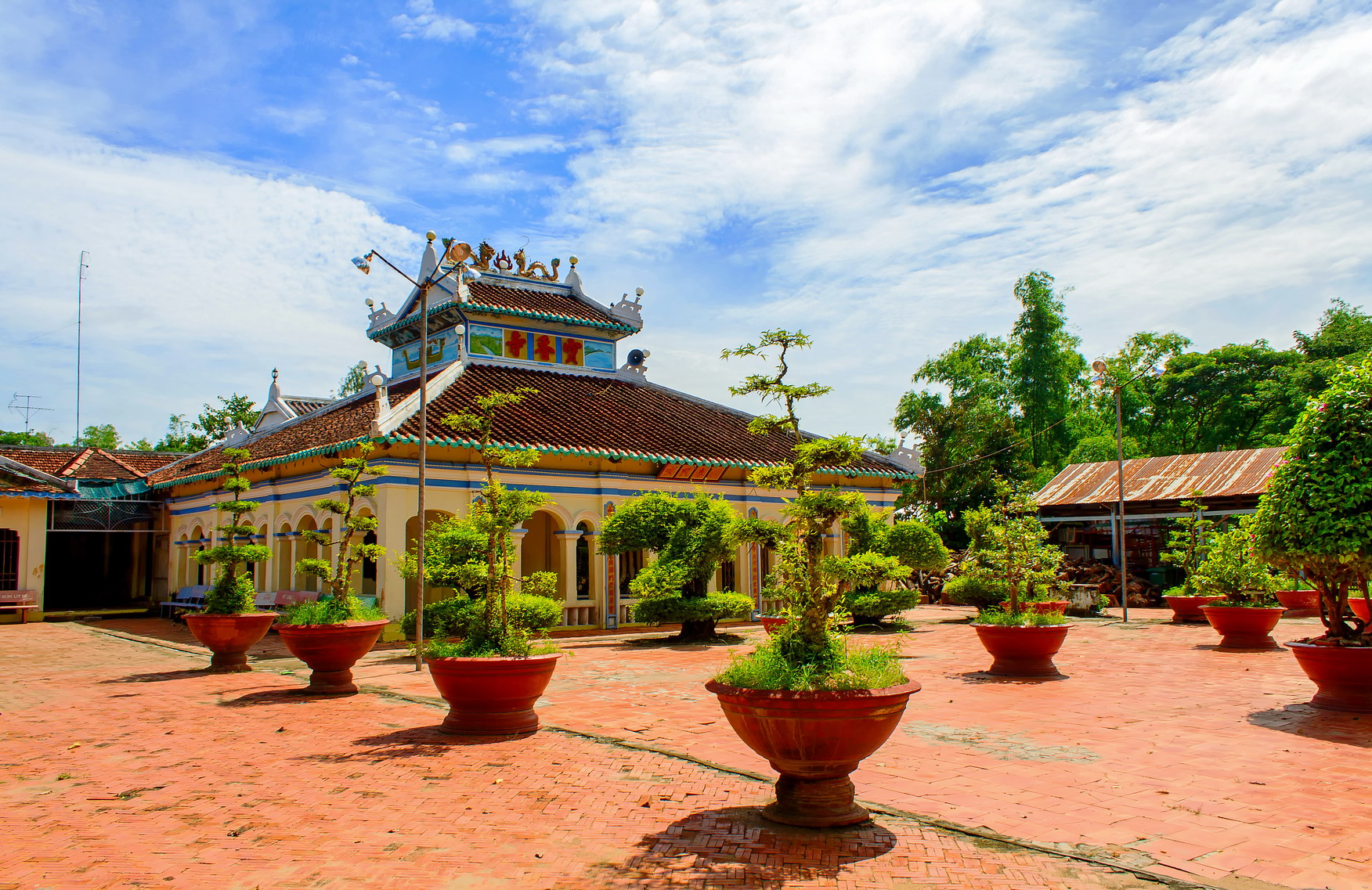

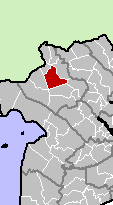
- Location in An Giang province
- Country: Vietnam
- Province: An Giang
- Capital: Cái Dầu

Area
  - District: 164 sq mi (426 km^{2})

Population (2019 census)
  - District: 206,676
  - Density: 1,260/sq mi (485/km^{2})
  - Urban: 16,958
- Time zone: UTC+07:00 (Indochina Time)

Châu Phú is a former rural district (huyện) of An Giang province in the Mekong Delta region of Vietnam. As of 2019, the district had a population of 206,676. The district covers an area of 426 km^{2}. The district capital lies at Cái Dầu. There are some festivals here, such as the "Bình Thủy temple worshiping" and the "Sir Tây An worshiping"

Châu Phú is located 20 km north of Long Xuyên and 20 km south of Châu Đốc, the main towns in the province.

The district comprises 12 communes and one thị trấn: Khánh Hòa, Mỹ Đức, Mỹ Phú, Ô Long Vĩ, Vĩnh Thạnh Trung, Thạnh Mỹ Tây, Bình Long, Đào Hữu Cảnh, Bình Phú, Bình Chánh, Bình Mỹ and thị trấn Cái Dầu.

Most of the population follows the Hòa Hảo religious sect.

On June 16, 2025, the Standing Committee of the National Assembly issued Resolution No. 1685/NQ-UBTVQH15. The district was dissolved and new wards were rearranged from the district.
