= Tân Hồng district =

Tân Hồng
- District
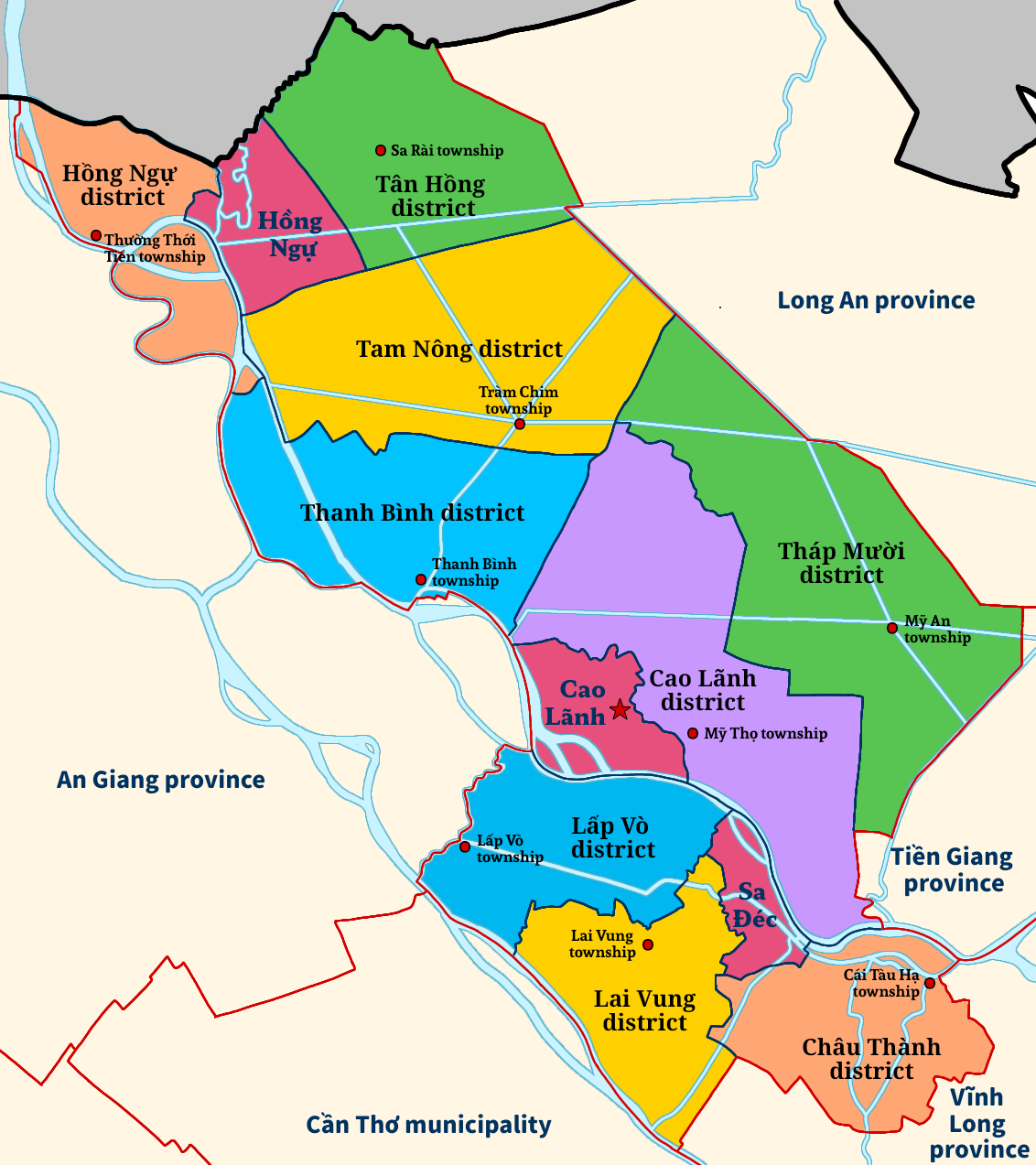
- Location of Tân Hồng district on Đồng Tháp province map.

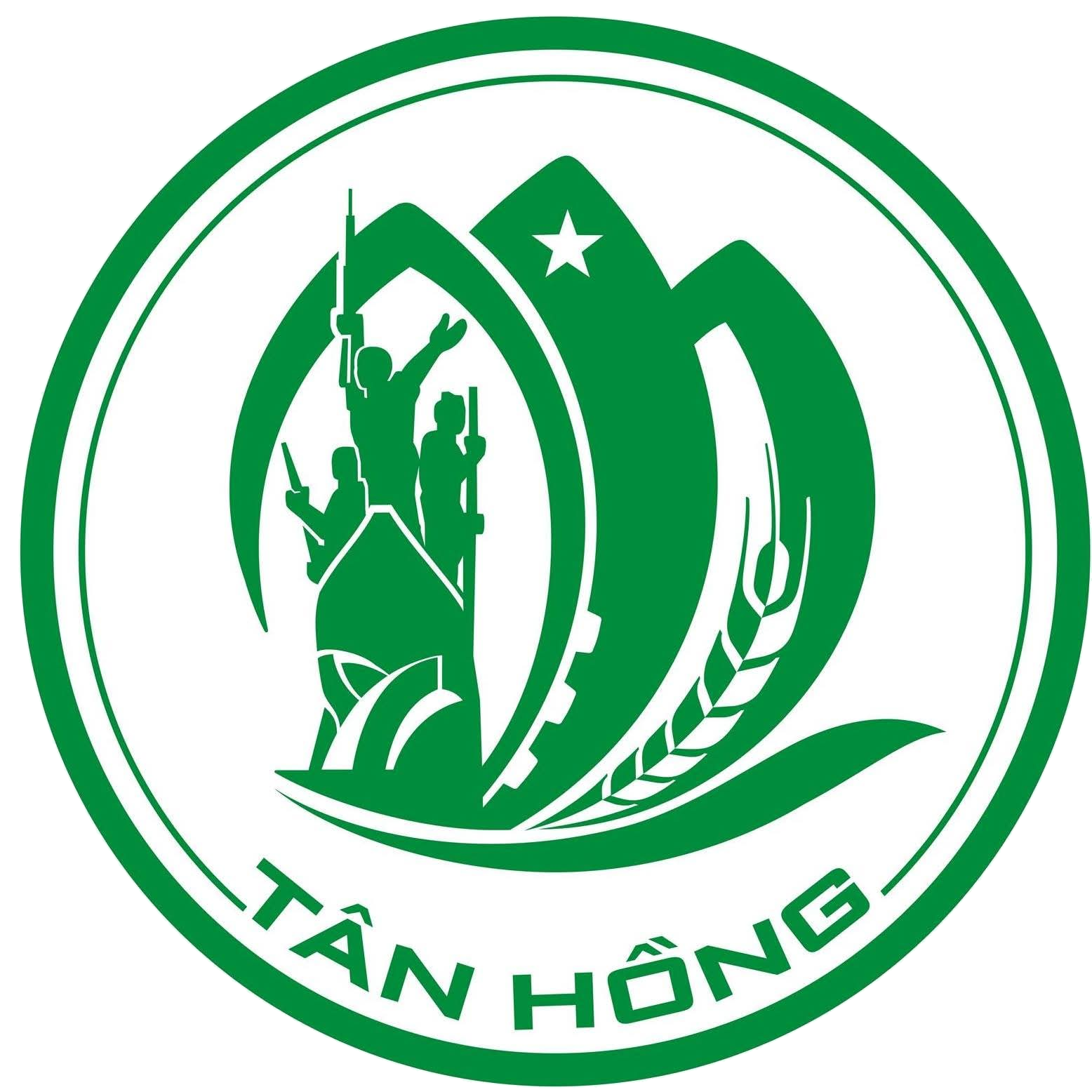
- Seal
- Interactive map of Tân Hồng
- Coordinates: 10°52′17″N 105°25′40″E
- Country: Vietnam
- Region: Mekong Delta
- Province: Đồng Tháp
- Time zone: UTC+7 (Indochina Time)
- Postal code: 810000
- Area code: 277

Tân Hồng is a former district in Đồng Tháp Province, Mekong Delta. Today part of Tân Hồng, Tân Hộ Cơ, Tân Thành, An Phước belonging to Đồng Tháp province, Vietnam.

== Divisions ==
The district is divided into Sa Rài Town and the following communes:

1. An Phước
2. Bình Phú
3. Tân Công Chí
4. Tân Hộ Cơ
5. Tân Phước
6. Tân Thành A
7. Tân Thành B
8. Thông Bình
