= Châu Phú, An Giang =

Châu Phú Xã Châu Phú Cái Dầu
- Commune
- Location in Vietnam
- Coordinates: 10°21′37″N 105°31′5″E
- Country: Vietnam
- Province: An Giang Province
- Established: 1979

Area
  - Total: 2.47 sq mi (6.39 km^{2})

Population (1999)
  - Total: 17,971
  - Density: 7,280/sq mi (2,812/km^{2})
- Time zone: UTC+07:00

Châu Phú is a commune (xã) of An Giang Province, Vietnam.
