= Hồng Ngự (city) =

Coordinates: 10.833°N 105.283°E

- Provincial city (Class-3)
- Hồng Ngự City; Thành phố Hồng Ngự
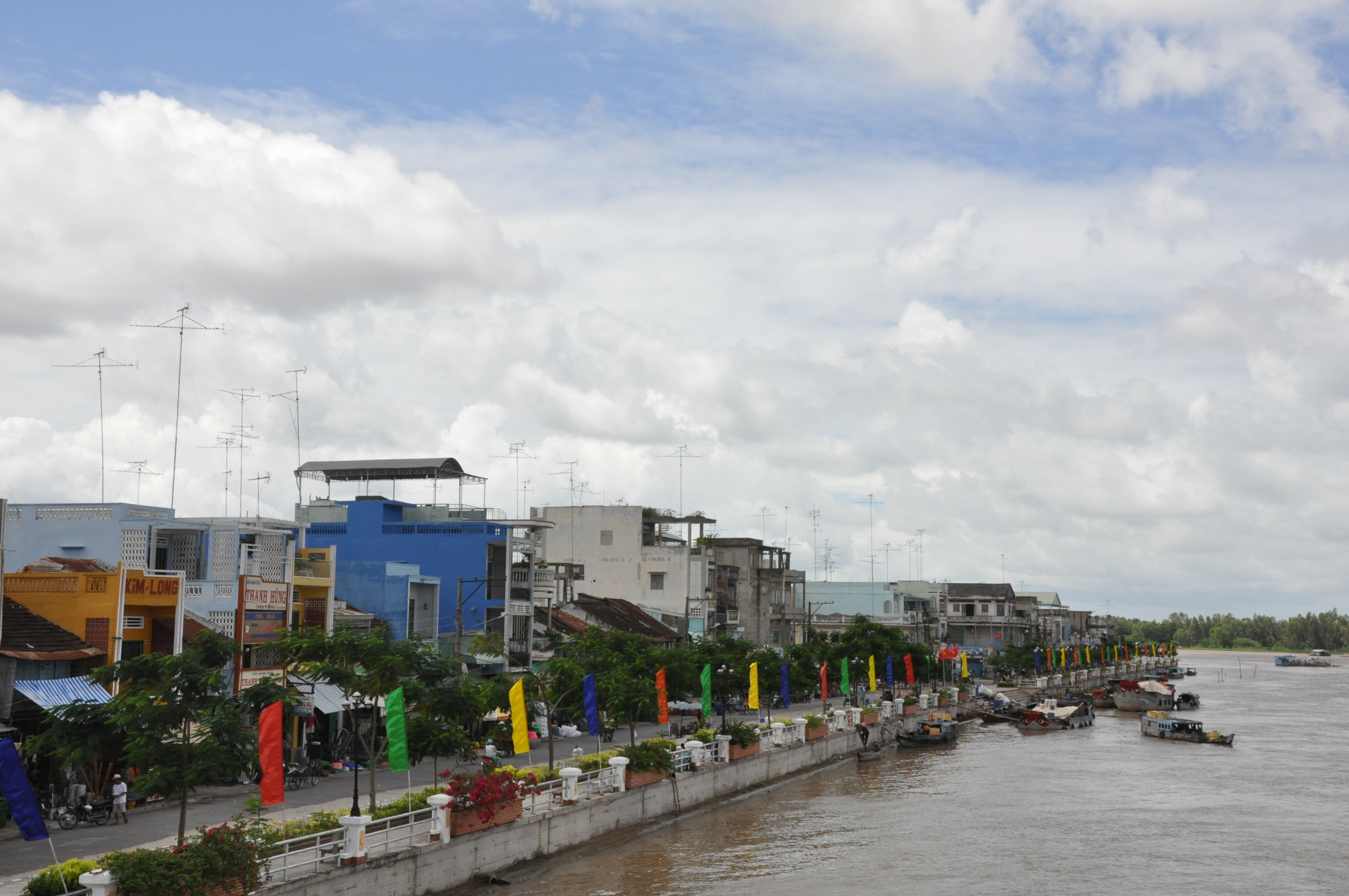
- Provincial Highway 841
- Interactive map of Hồng Ngự
- Location within Vietnam Location within Southeast Asia Location within Asia
- Country: Vietnam
- Region: Mekong Delta
- Province: Đồng Tháp

Area
  - Provincial city (Class-3): 47.17 sq mi (122.16 km^{2})
  - Urban: 6.2624 sq mi (16.2196 km^{2})

Population (2019)
  - Provincial city (Class-3): 101,155
  - Density: 1,660/sq mi (639/km^{2})
  - Urban: 39,988
  - Urban density: 6,385/sq mi (2,465.4/km^{2})
- Time zone: UTC+7 (Indochina Time)

Hồng Ngự is a provincial city (thành phố) in Đồng Tháp Province in the Mekong Delta region of Vietnam. It was separated from Hồng Ngự District in 2008.

The city is subdivided into 5 wards: An Bình A, An Bình B, An Lạc, An Lộc and An Thạnh, and 2 communes: Tân Hội, Bình Thạnh.

== Geography ==
Hồng Ngự city has its borders with Cambodia; bordered with Pray Veng province, Cambodia in the North, with Tam Nông district in the South, with Tân Hồng district in the East, and with Hồng Ngự district in the West.

== Economic development ==
Hồng Ngự city is known as one key urban areas of Đồng Tháp province. Additionally, Hồng Ngự city is the key economic zone of the Đồng Tháp province in the North in agriculture and border economy. This economic centre not only influences in Dong Thap province, but also contributes to the development of the economy of the whole area of Đồng Tháp Mười and the economic border corridor of the province.
