= Tân Thành, Đồng Tháp =

Tân Thành Xã Tân Thành
- commune
- Tân Thành
- Interactive map of Tân Thành
- Country: Vietnam
- Region: Mekong Delta
- Province/state: Đồng Tháp Province
- Seat: 999, DT851 way

Area
  - Total: 69 sq mi (179 km^{2})
- Elevation: 20 ft (6 m)

Population (2013)
  - Total: 23.109
  - Density: 3,340/sq mi (1,291/km^{2})
- Time zone: UTC+7 (Vietnam)

Tân Thành (Vietnamese: Xã Tân Thành) is a commune of Đồng Tháp Province, in the Mekong Delta region of Vietnam.

== History ==
On June 16, 2025, the Standing Committee of the National Assembly of Vietnam issued Resolution No. 1663/NQ-UBTVQH15 on the arrangement of commune-level administrative units of Đồng Tháp province in 2025. Accordingly: the entire natural area and population size of Thông Bình and Tân Thành A communes are reorganized to form a new commune named Tân Thành.
