= Hồng Ngự district =

Coordinates: 10.833°N 105.283°E

Hồng Ngự district Huyện Hồng Ngự
- District
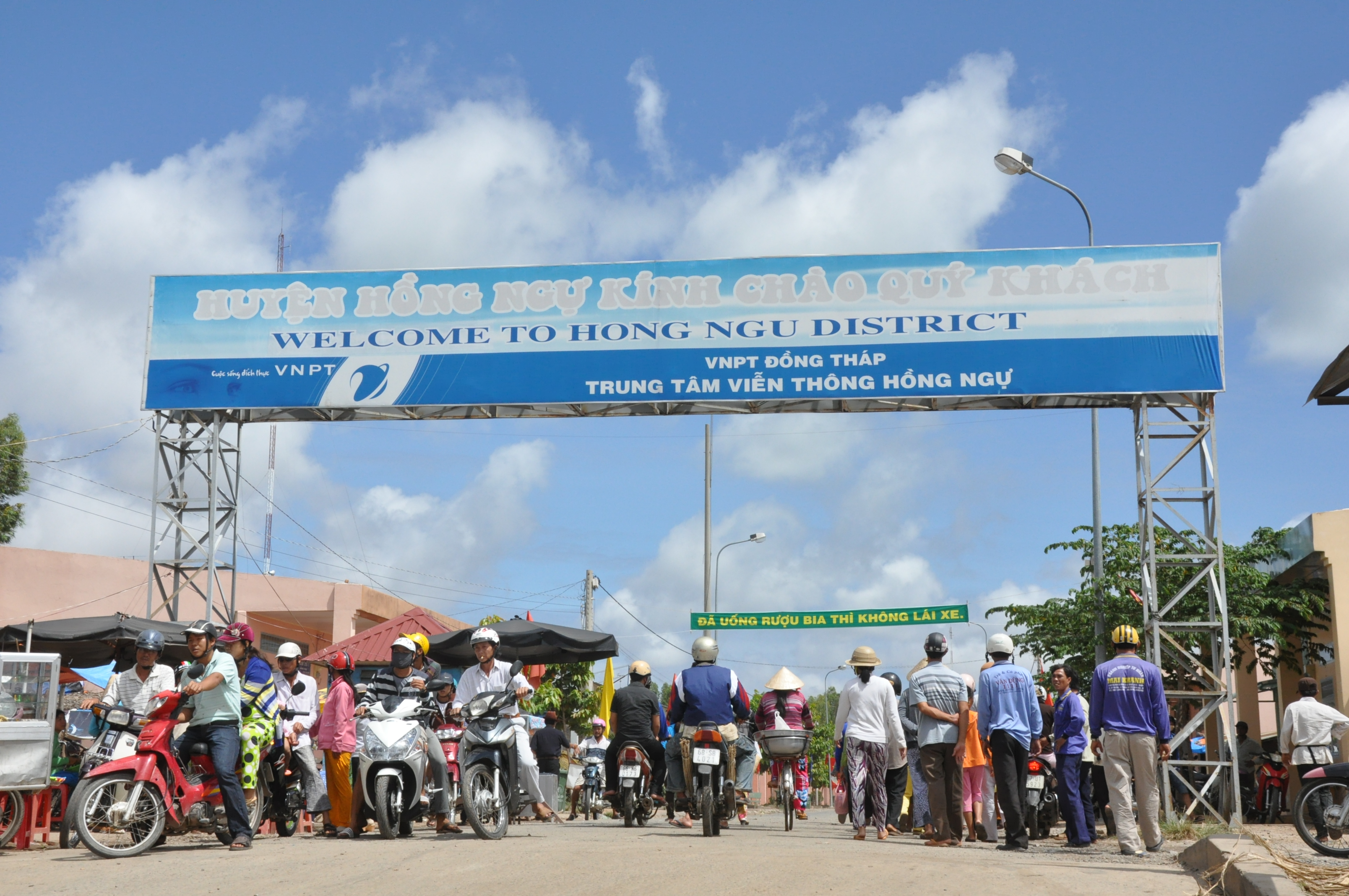
- A sign saying "Welcome to Hồng Ngự District"
- Interactive map of Hồng Ngự district
- Location within Vietnam Location within Southeast Asia Location within Asia
- Country: Vietnam
- Region: Mekong Delta
- Province: Đồng Tháp
- Founded: December 19, 1929; 1930: official
- Capital: Thường Thới Tiền

Area
  - District: 80.98 sq mi (209.74 km^{2})

Population (2018)
  - District: 211,000
  - Density: 1,490/sq mi (575/km^{2})
  - Urban: 14.947
- Time zone: UTC+7 (Indochina Time)
- Website: hongngu.dongthap.gov.vn

Hồng Ngự was a rural district of Đồng Tháp province in the Mekong Delta region of Vietnam. As of 2009 the district had a population of 150,050. The district covers an area of 209.74 km^{2} (80.98 sq mi). The district capital lies at Thường Thới Tiền.

On December 23, 2008, Hồng Ngự township, the communes of An Bình A, An Bình B, Bình Thạnh, Tân Hội and a portion of Thường Lạc commune were separated from the district to form the new district-level town of Hồng Ngự.

On June 16, 2025, the Standing Committee of the National Assembly issued Resolution No. 1685/NQ-UBTVQH15. The district was dissolved and new wards were rearranged from the district.

== Divisions ==
The district is divided into the following communes:

- Hồng Ngự
1. Thường Thới Tiền (commune-level town)
2. Phú Thuận A
3. Phú Thuận B
4. Long Thuận
5. Long Khánh A
6. Long Khánh B
7. Thường Lạc
8. Thường Thới Hậu A
9. Thường Thới Hậu B
10. Thường Phước 1
11. Thường Phước 2

== Gallery ==
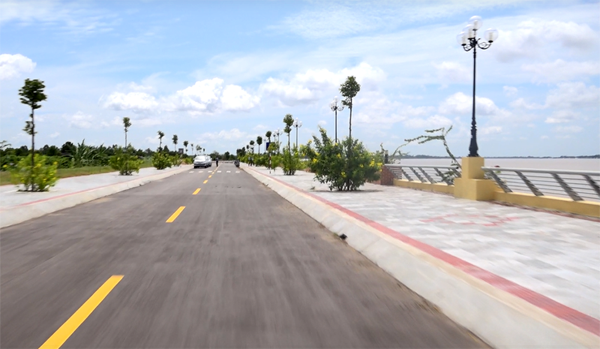
Thường Thới Tiền embankment

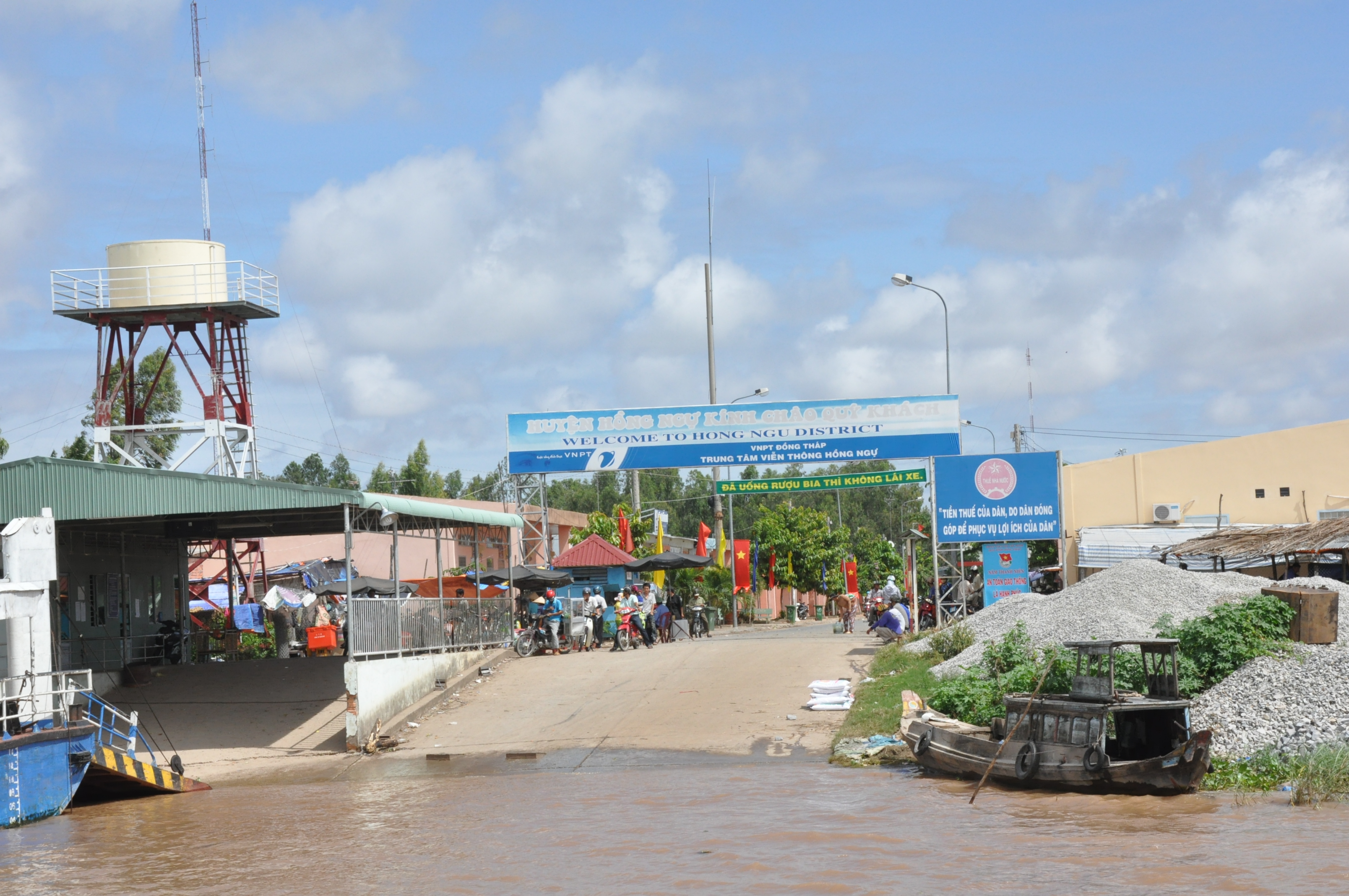
Thường Thới Tiền ferry terminal
