= Tân Hồng =

Tân Hồng Xã Tân Hồng
- Commune
- Tân Hồng commune
- Location within Vietnam
- Coordinates: 10°52′50″N 105°27′06″E
- Country: Vietnam
- Region: Mekong Delta
- Province: Đồng Tháp
- Time zone: UTC+7 (UTC + 7)

Tân Hồng is a commune (xã) of Đồng Tháp Province, Vietnam.
