= Vĩnh Long Newspaper and Radio, Television =

Vietnamese television network

- Logo used by radio and television divisions
- Industry: Media
- Founded: 1 July 2025; 16 months ago
- Headquarters: 50 Phạm Thái Bường Blvd., Phước Hậu, Vĩnh Long, Vietnam
- Key people: Lê Thanh Tuấn (director)
- Owner: Vĩnh Long Province People's Committee
- Website: thvl.vn

Vĩnh Long Newspaper and Radio, Television (Vietnamese: Báo và phát thanh, truyền hình Vĩnh Long, lit. 'Newspaper and Radio, Television of Vĩnh Long') is a Vietnamese media outlet. Formed on 1 July 2025 by the merge of media outlets of three former provinces: Vĩnh Long, Bến Tre and Trà Vinh, it is owned by the People's Committee of the new Vĩnh Long province, with their current operations including newspaper, radio and television. The TV channels, called THVL, (Note: "THVL" stands for Truyền hình Vĩnh Long in Vietnamese.) are the largest in the Southwest region of Vietnam and rank among the top three television networks in the country, alongside Vietnam Television (VTV) and Ho Chi Minh City Television (HTV), in terms of viewership ratings.

== History ==
The Vĩnh Long Newspaper and Radio, Television originated as Cửu Long Radio Station (Vietnamese: Đài Phát thanh Cửu Long), which officially launched on 22 December 1977 in Vĩnh Long, Cửu Long province. In 1984, the station began broadcasting television programs and was renamed as Cửu Long Radio and Television Station (Đài Phát thanh và Truyền hình Cửu Long). Two years later, the station built its own television transmitter to enhance signal coverage throughout the province.

In 1989, the station installed a 10-kilowatt radio transmitter, extending its reach across the entire province and into neighboring regions. Following the split of Cửu Long Province into provinces of Vĩnh Long and Trà Vinh on 26 December 1991, the station was rebranded as Vĩnh Long Radio and Television Station (Đài Phát thanh – Truyền hình Vĩnh Long). It began broadcasting under this new name in 1992.

Since 2006, the station has increased its production of in-house radio and television programs, adopting the slogan: "Providing viewers with the services they need, rather than the services they have." In 2008, the station launched its cable TV network, THVLC, offering 80 local and international channels.

In March 2013, Vĩnh Long Radio and Television Station was awarded the Third-Class Independence Medal by Vietnamese President Trương Tấn Sang in recognition of its contributions. The station has also invested in digital platforms, launching an official YouTube channel and the THVLi mobile app, which allows users to watch live THVL's programs. In December 2016, THVL transitioned from analog to digital broadcasting.

In April 2025, Vĩnh Long Radio and Television Station and Vĩnh Long Newspaper merged, creating a new agency, called Vĩnh Long Provincial Newspaper and Radio – Television Station (Báo và Đài Phát thanh – Truyền hình tỉnh Vĩnh Long). On 1 July 2025, Vĩnh Long Provincial Newspaper and Radio – Television Station merged with media outlets of former Bến Tre and Trà Vinh provinces, creating Vĩnh Long Newspaper and Radio, Television.

== Operations ==
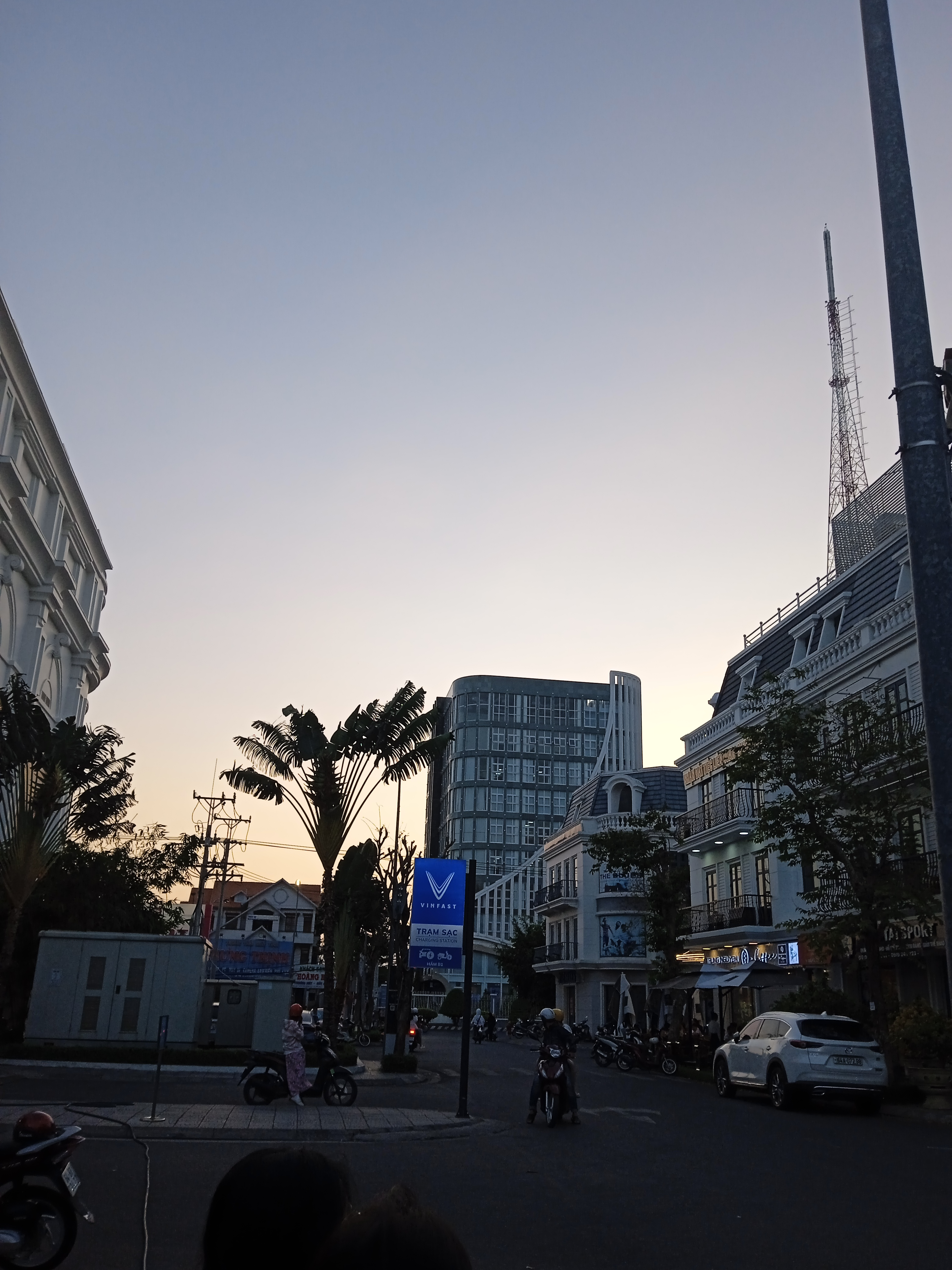
A corner of Vĩnh Long Radio and Television Technical Center

Vĩnh Long Newspaper and Radio, Television currently runs five television channels (THVL1, THVL2, THVL3, THVL4 and THVL5), a triple-frequency radio channel, an online newspaper and two printed newspapers, as well as OTT platforms THVLi and THVLaudio. There are also 57 YouTube channels and 78 Facebook fanpages managed by the agency.

== Controversies ==
THVL has faced criticism for some of its programming, which has been accused of being biased and presenting inaccurate information.

- "Warning" (Lời Cảnh Bảo): This episode discussed negative aspects of anime, particularly focusing on ecchi content. The station mistakenly aired an entire hentai series as an example of ecchi, equating it with anime in general. This led to backlash from anime fans, who criticized the station on social media, forcing THVL to disable comments and eventually delete the video.
- "Life's story" (Câu Chuyện Cuộc Sống): This episode, titled "Robbery and murder mission game - Entertainment or promoting crime," described survival video games like PlayerUnknown's Battlegrounds and Minecraft as promoting violence. The episode was met with criticism from the gaming community, leading the station to remove the video.

In May 2019, THVL aired another controversial video titled "Online game addiction is more difficult to overcome than drug addiction" (Nghiện game online còn khó cai hơn nghiện ma túy). This video also faced backlash and was subsequently deleted from YouTube.
