= Thanh Đức =

- Ward
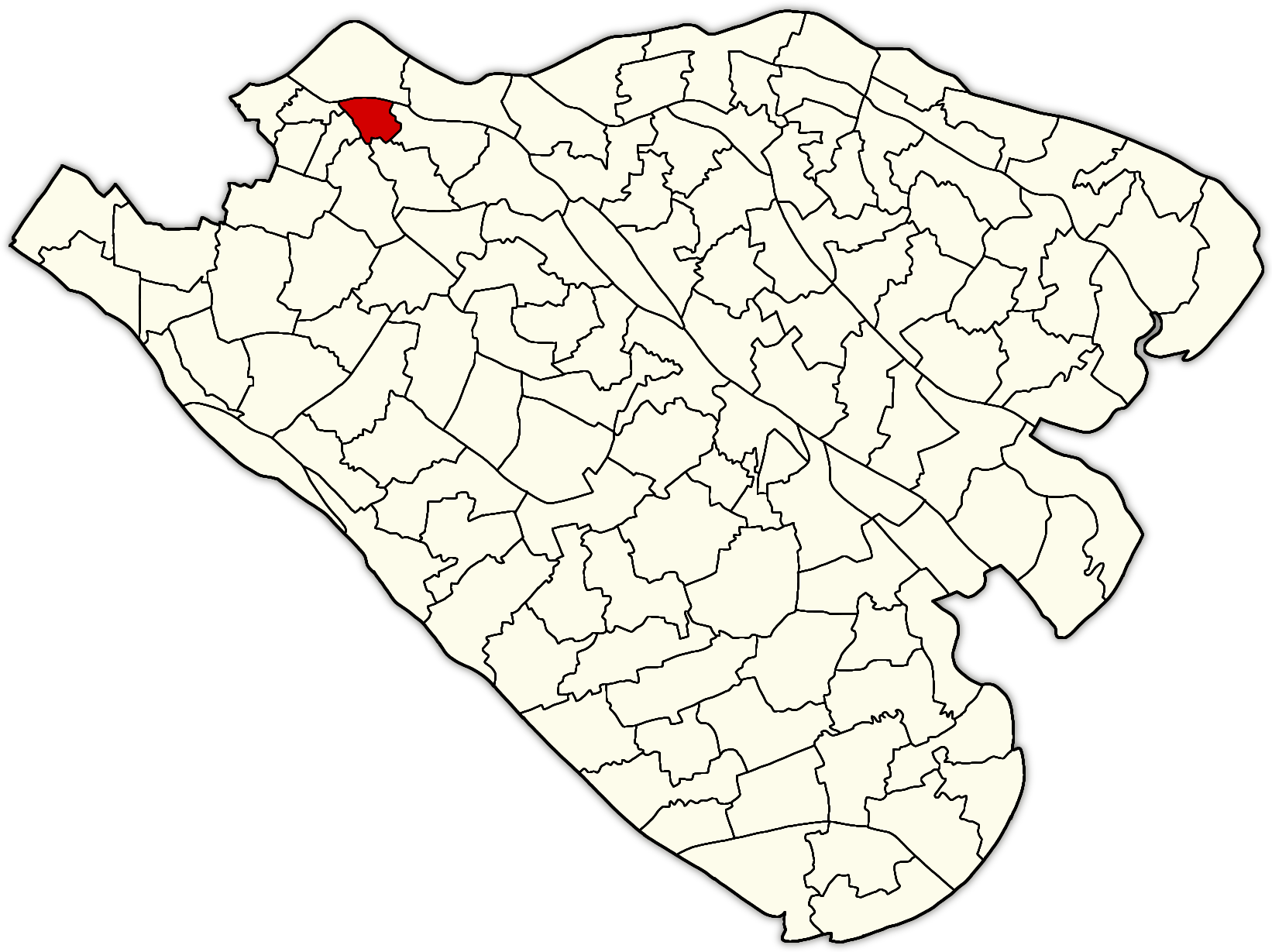
- Location of Thanh Đức ward in Vĩnh Long province map (highlight in red).
- Interactive map of Thanh Đức
- Country: Vietnam
- Province: Vĩnh Long
- Establish: June 16, 2025

Area
  - Total: 16.49 km^{2} (6.37 sq mi)

Population
  - Total: 35,158 people
  - Density: 2,132/km^{2} (5,522/sq mi)

Thanh Đức is a ward in Vĩnh Long province, Vietnam. It is one of 124 communes and wards in the province after the 2025 reorganization.

== Geography ==
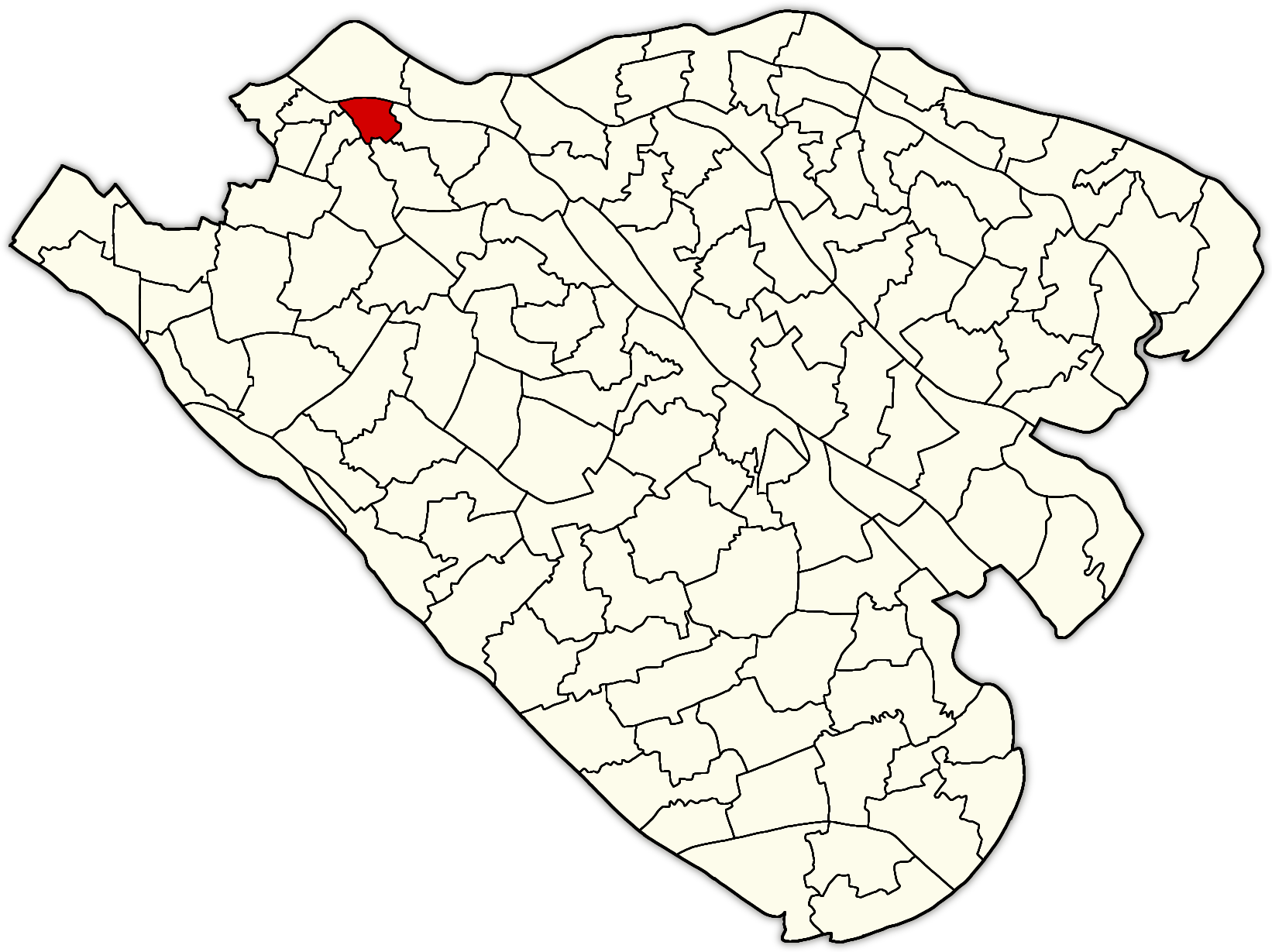
Location of Thanh Đức ward in Vĩnh Long province map (highlight in red).

Thanh Đức ward has the following geographical location:

- To the north, it borders An Bình commune.
- To the west, it borders Long Châu ward and Phước Hậu ward.
- To the east, it borders Nhơn Phú commune.
- To the south, it borders Long Hồ commune and Bình Phước commune.

== History ==
Prior to 2025, the current Thanh Đức ward was formerly Ward 5 (belonging to Vĩnh Long provincial city) and Thanh Đức commune (belonging to Long Hồ district).

On June 12, 2025, the National Assembly of Vietnam issued Resolution No. 202/2025/QH15 on the reorganization of provincial-level administrative units. Accordingly:

- Vĩnh Long province was established by merging the entire area and population of Bến Tre province, Vĩnh Long province, and Trà Vinh province.

On June 16, 2025, the Standing Committee of the National Assembly of Vietnam issued Resolution No. 1687/NQ-UBTVQH15 on the reorganization of commune-level administrative units in Vĩnh Long province. Accordingly:

- Thanh Đức ward was established by merging the entire area and population of ward 5 (formerly part of Vĩnh Long city) and Thanh Đức commune (formerly part of Long Hồ district).
