= Bình Phước (disambiguation) =

Bình Phước could be one of the following locations in Vietnam.

- Bình Phước: ward in Đồng Nai municipality.
- Bình Phước: commune in Vĩnh Long province.

Former names

- Bình Phước: former province in Southeast of Vietnam (today part of Đồng Nai municipality).
- Bình Phước: commune in Mang Thít district, Vĩnh Long province (today part of Bình Phước commune, Vĩnh Long province).
- Bình Phước: commune in Bình Sơn district, Quảng Ngãi province (today part of Vạn Tường commune, Quảng Ngãi province).
