= Phước Hậu, Vĩnh Long =

Phước Hậu
- Ward
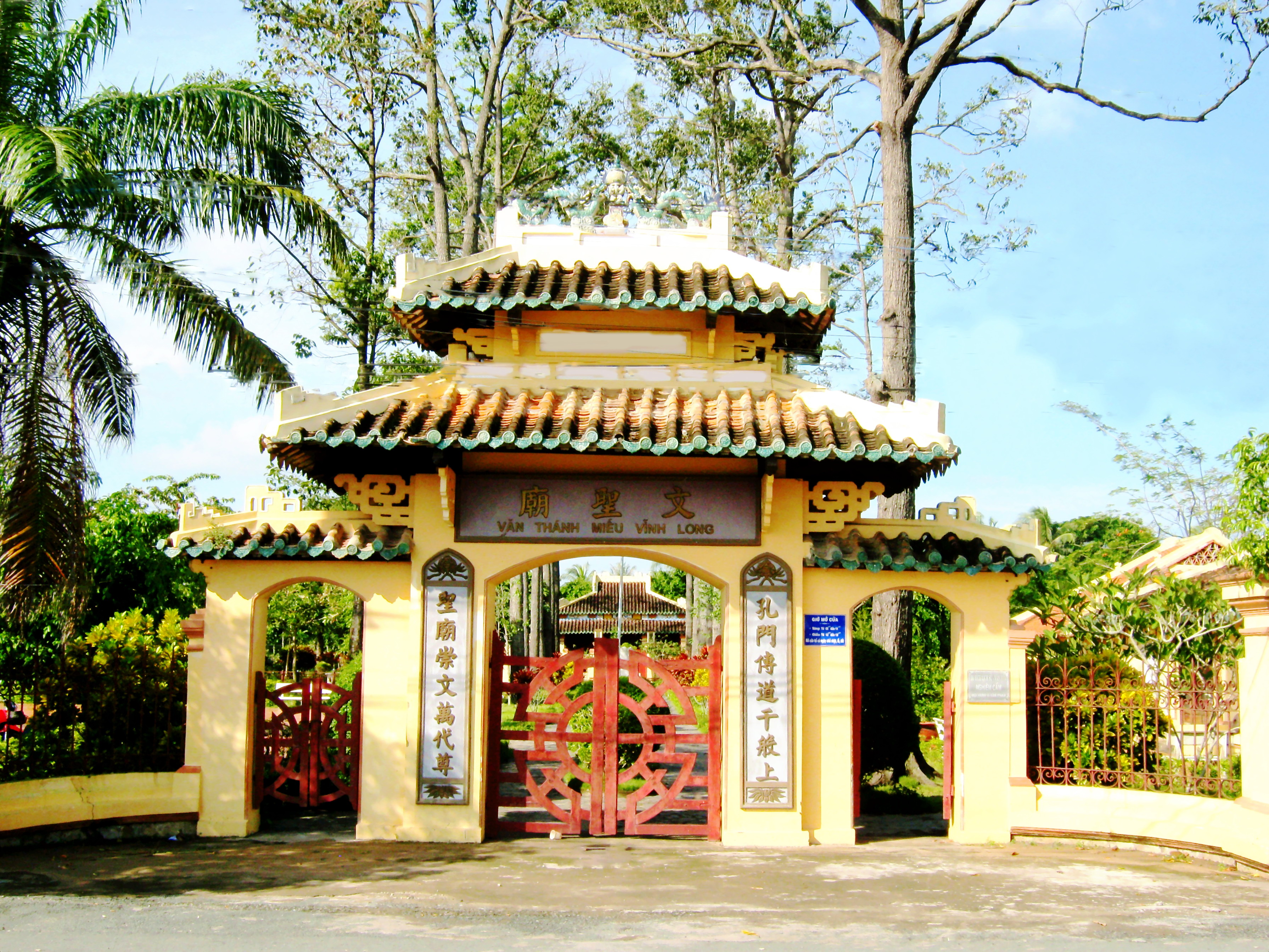
- Vĩnh Long Confucian Temple
- Interactive map of Phước Hậu
- Country: Vietnam
- Province: Vĩnh Long
- Establish: June 16, 2025

Area
  - Total: 15.52 km^{2} (5.99 sq mi)

Population (2025)
  - Total: 50,839 people
  - Density: 3,276/km^{2} (8,484/sq mi)
- Time zone: UTC+07:00

Phước Hậu is a ward in Vĩnh Long province. It is one of 124 communes and wards in the province after the 2025 reorganization.

== Geography ==
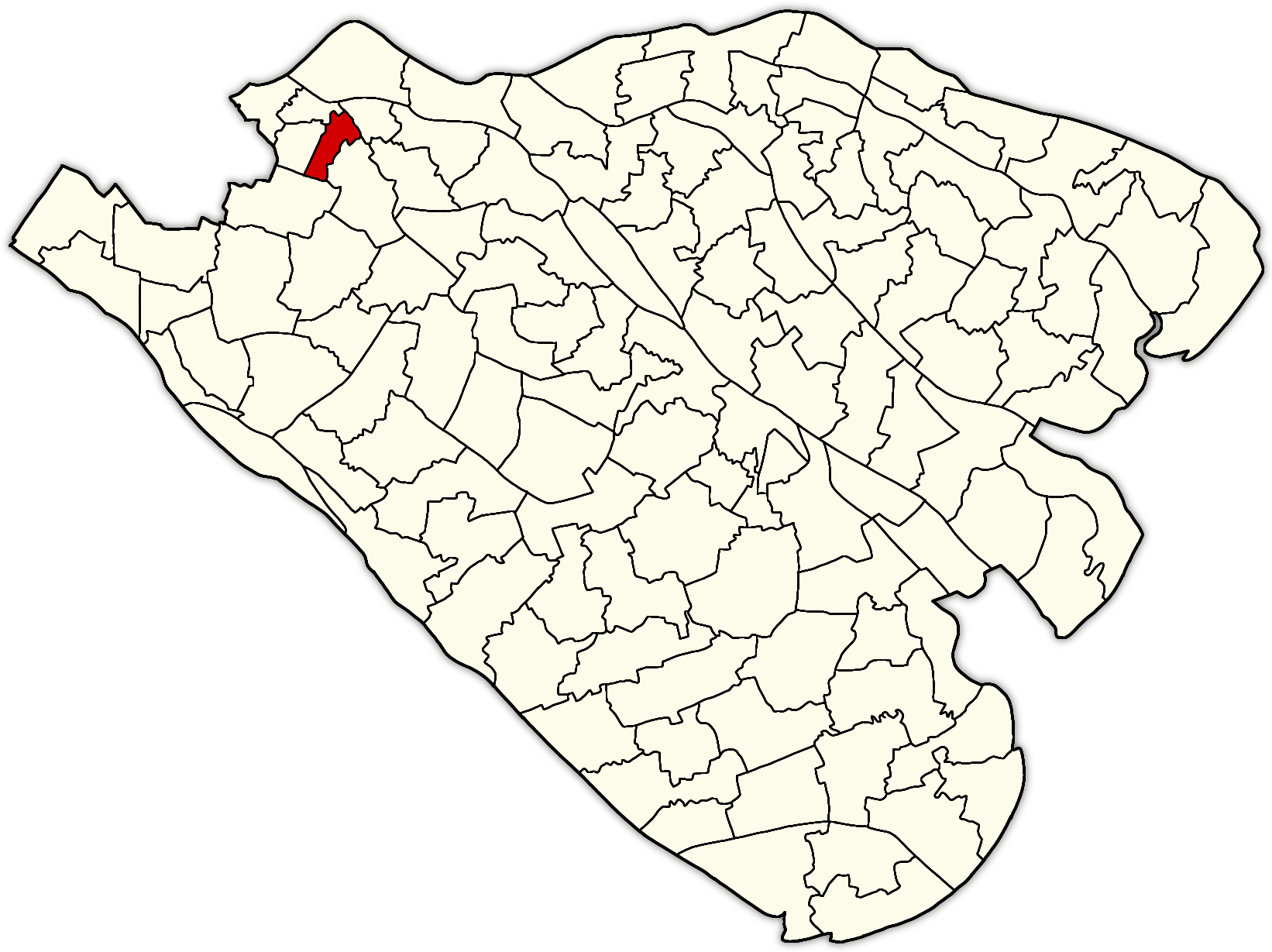
Location of Phước Hậu ward in Vĩnh Long province map (highlight in red).

Phước Hậu is a ward in Vĩnh Long province. The ward has the following geographical location:

- To the north, it borders Long Châu ward and Thanh Đức ward.
- To the east, it borders Long Hồ commune.
- To the south, it borders Phú Quới commune.
- To the west, it borders Tân Hạnh ward.

== History ==
Prior to 2025, the current Phước Hậu ward was formerly ward 3, ward 4 of Vĩnh Long city and Phước Hậu commune of Long Hồ district, both in Vĩnh Long province.

On June 12, 2025, the National Assembly of Vietnam issued Resolution No. 202/2025/QH15 on the reorganization of provincial-level administrative units. Accordingly:

- Vĩnh Long province was established by merging the entire area and population of Bến Tre province, Vĩnh Long province, and Trà Vinh province.
1. After the reorganization, the new Vĩnh Long province has an area of 6296.20 km² and a population of 4,386,100 people, with a density of approximately 696 people/km².
2. Vĩnh Long province borders Đồng Tháp province to the north, Cần Thơ city to the west, and has a coastline bordering the East Sea to the east.

June 16, 2025, the Standing Committee of the National Assembly of Vietnam issued Resolution No. 1687/NQ-UBTVQH15 on the reorganization of commune-level administrative units in Vĩnh Long province. Accordingly:

- Phước Hậu ward was established by merging the entire area and population of Ward 3 and Ward 4 (formerly Vĩnh Long provincial city) and Phước Hậu commune (formerly Long Hồ district).
