= Cái Nhum (disambiguation) =

Cái Nhum is a commune in Vĩnh Long province.

Cái Nhum may also refer to:

- Cái Nhum, commune-level town in Mang Thít district, Vĩnh Long province
- Cái Nhum, old name of Mang Thít district, Vĩnh Long province
