= Bình Phước, Vĩnh Long =

Bình Phước
- Commune
- Mang Thít brick kiln
- Interactive map of Bình Phước
- Country: Vietnam
- Province: Vĩnh Long
- Establish: June 16, 2025

Area
  - Total: 35.67 km^{2} (13.77 sq mi)

Population
  - Total: 29,418 people
  - Density: 824.7/km^{2} (2,136/sq mi)
- Time zone: UTC+07:00

Bình Phước is a commune in Vĩnh Long province. It is one of 124 communes and wards in the province after the 2025 reorganization.

== Geography ==
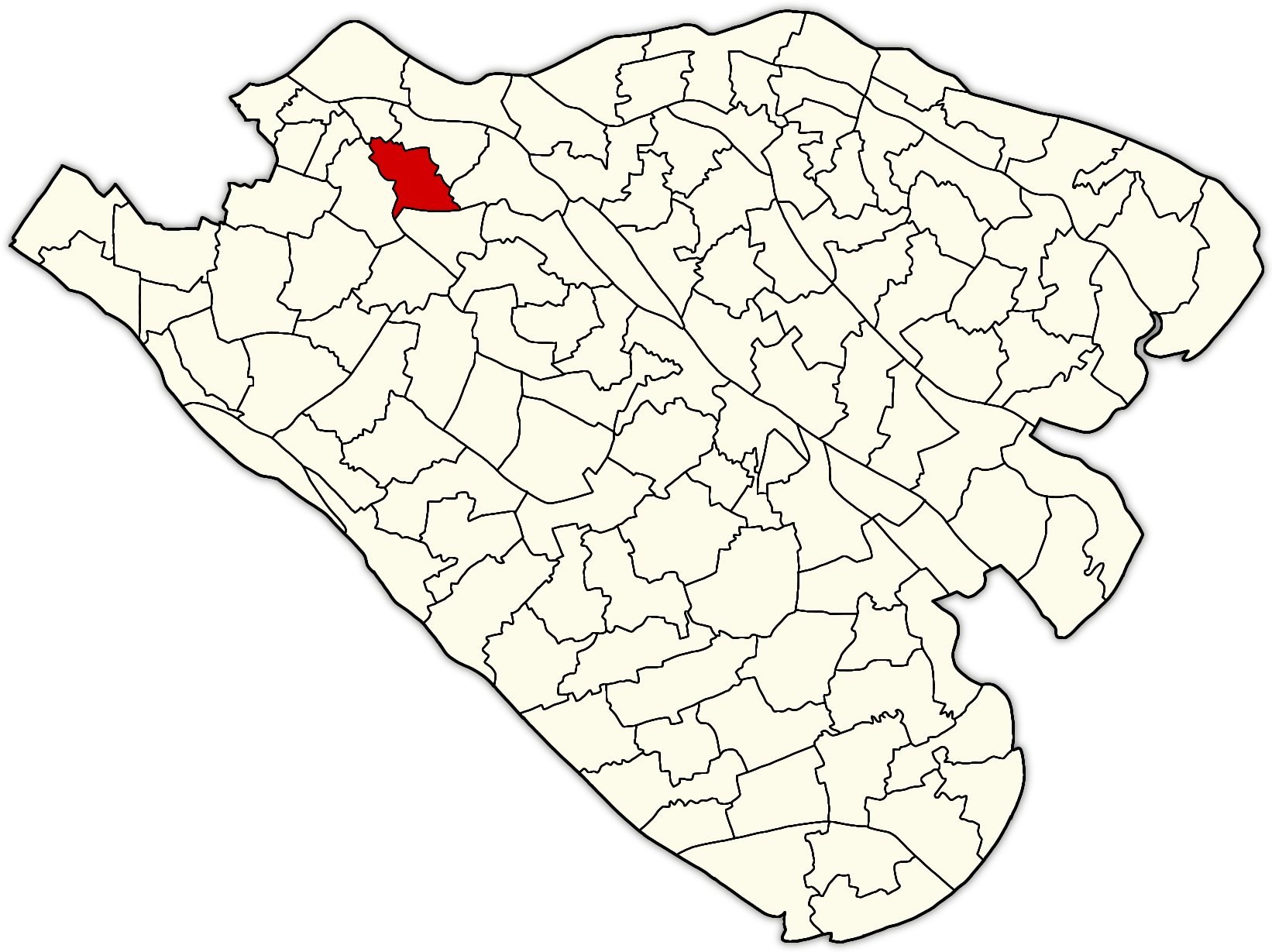
Location of Bình Phước commune in Vĩnh Long province map (highlight in red).

Bình Phước commune has the following geographical location:

- To the north, it borders Thanh Đức ward and Nhơn Phú commune.
- To the west, it borders Long Hồ commune.
- To the south, it borders Tân Long Hội commune.
- To the east, it borders Cái Nhum commune.

== History ==
Prior to 2025, Bình Phước commune was formerly Hòa Tịnh commune, Bình Phước commune, and Long Mỹ commune in Mang Thít district, Vĩnh Long province.

On June 12, 2025, the National Assembly of Vietnam issued Resolution No. 202/2025/QH15 on the reorganization of provincial-level administrative units. Accordingly:

- Vĩnh Long province was established by merging the entire area and population of Bến Tre province, Vĩnh Long province, and Trà Vinh province.

On June 16, 2025, the Standing Committee of the National Assembly of Vietnam issued Resolution No. 1684/NQ-UBTVQH15 on the reorganization of commune-level administrative units in Vĩnh Long province. Accordingly:

- Bình Phước commune was established by merging the entire area and population of Hòa Tịnh, Bình Phước, and Long Mỹ communes (formerly part of Long Hồ district).
