= Phú Phụng =

- Commune
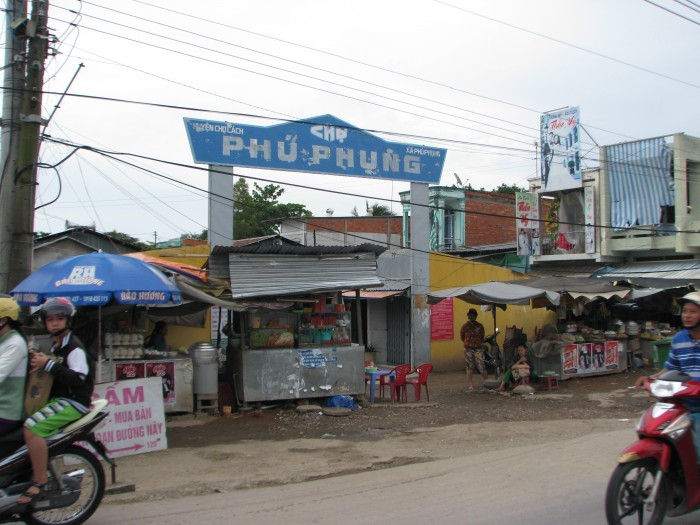
- Phú Phụng market
- Interactive map of Phú Phụng
- Country: Vietnam
- Province: Vĩnh Long
- Establish: June 16, 2026

Area
  - Total: 47.89 km^{2} (18.49 sq mi)

Population
  - Total: 38,495 people
  - Density: 803.8/km^{2} (2,082/sq mi)
- Time zone: UTC+07:00

Phú Phụng is a commune in Vĩnh Long province, Vietnam. It is one of 124 communes and wards in the province following the 2025 reorganization.

== Geography ==
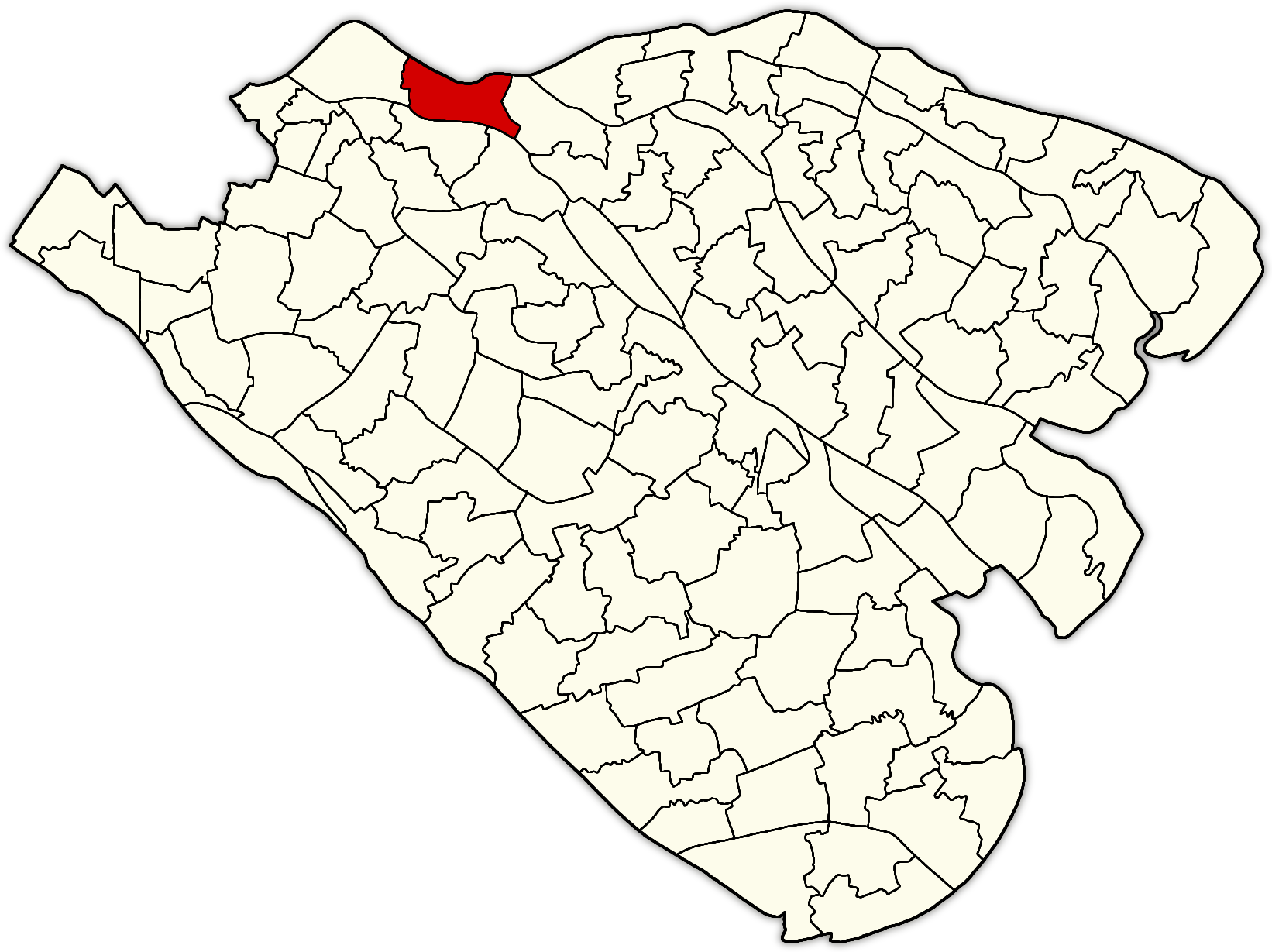
Location of Phú Phụng commune in Vĩnh Long province map (highlight in red).

Phú Phụng is a commune located in the northern part of Vĩnh Long province. It is 20 km east of Long Châu ward, 45 km west of Bến Tre ward, 65 km northwest of Trà Vinh ward. The commune has the following geographical location:

- To the north, it borders Đồng Tháp province.
- To the east, it borders Chợ Lách commune.
- To the south, it borders Nhơn Phú commune and Cái Nhum commune.

== History ==
Prior to 2025, the current Phú Phụng commune consisted of the communes of Phú Phụng, Vĩnh Bình, and Sơn Định in Chợ Lách district, Bến Tre province.

On June 12, 2025, the National Assembly of Vietnam issued Resolution No. 202/2025/QH15 on the reorganization of provincial-level administrative units. Accordingly:

- Vĩnh Long province was established by merging the entire area and population of Bến Tre, Vĩnh Long and Trà Vinh provinces.

On June 16, 2025, the Standing Committee of the National Assembly of Vietnam issued Resolution No. 1687/NQ-UBTVQH15 on the reorganization of commune-level administrative units in Vĩnh Long province. Accordingly:

- The Phú Phụng commune was established by merging the entire area and population of Phú Phụng commune, Vĩnh Bình commune and Sơn Định commune (formerly part of Chợ Lách district).
