= Mỹ Thuận =

Mỹ Thuận may refer to several places in Vietnam:

- Mỹ Thuận, Kiên Giang, a rural commune of Hòn Đất District, now part of Mỹ Thuận, An Giang
- Mỹ Thuận, Nam Định, a rural commune of Mỹ Lộc District
- Mỹ Thuận, Phú Thọ, a rural commune of Tân Sơn District
- Mỹ Thuận, Sóc Trăng, a rural commune of Mỹ Tú District
- Mỹ Thuận, Vĩnh Long, a rural commune of Bình Tân District
- Mỹ Thuận Bridge
