= Nhơn Phú =

- Commune
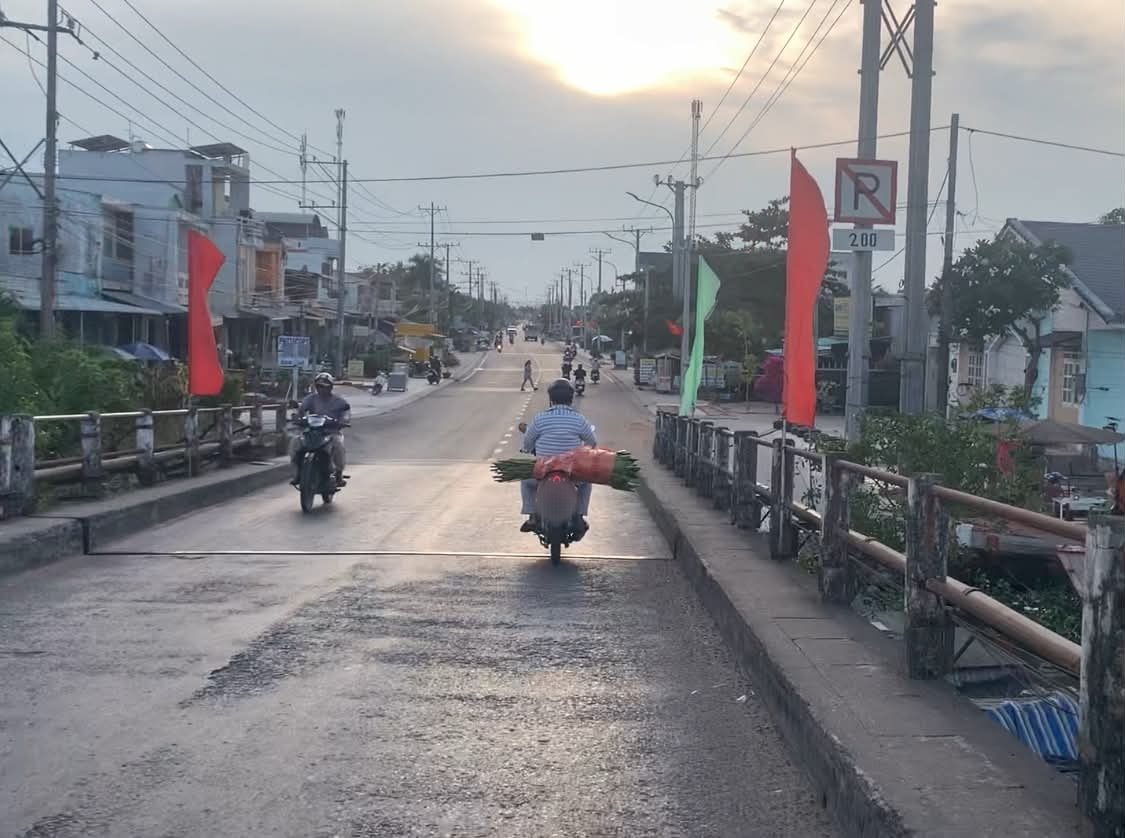
- Provincial road 902, the section passing through Nhơn Phú commune.
- Interactive map of Nhơn Phú
- Country: Vietnam
- Province: Vĩnh Long
- Establish: June 16, 2025

Area
  - Total: 38.09 km^{2} (14.71 sq mi)

Population
  - Total: 34,898 people
  - Density: 916.2/km^{2} (2,373/sq mi)
- Time zone: UTC+07:00

Nhơn Phú is a commune in Vĩnh Long province, Vietnam. It is one of 124 communes and wards in the province following the 2025 reorganization.

== Geography ==
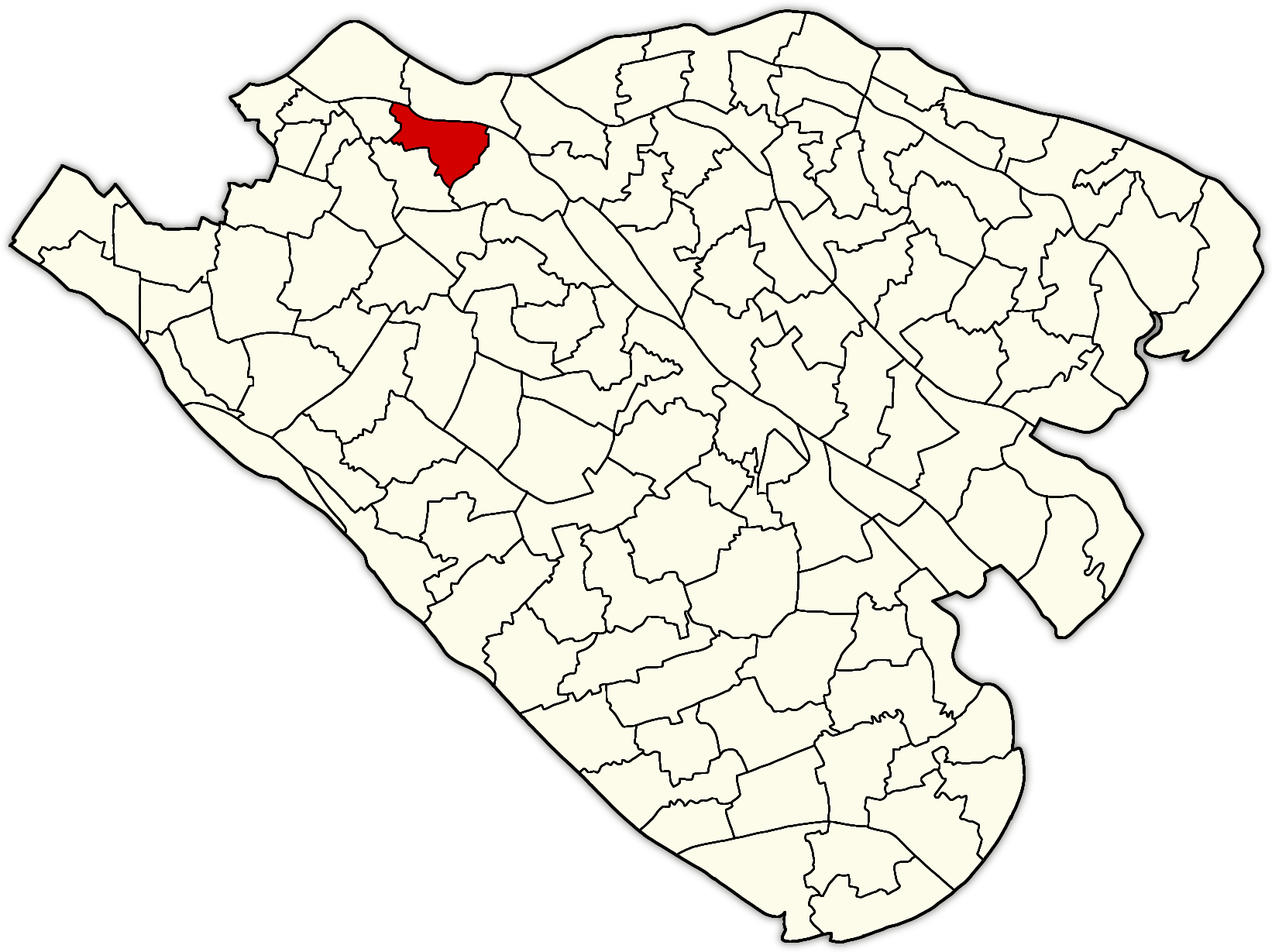
Location of Nhơn Phú commune on Vĩnh Long province map (highlight in red).

Nhơn Phú commune, Vĩnh Long province, has the following geographical location:

- To the north, it borders Phú Phụng commune (the boundary is the Cổ Chiên river).
- To the west, it borders Thanh Đức ward.
- To the south, it borders Bình Phước commune.
- To the east, it borders Cái Nhum commune.

== History ==
Before 2025, Nhơn Phú commune was formerly Mỹ An commune, Nhơn Phú commune, and Mỹ Phước commune belonging to Mang Thít district, Vĩnh Long province.

On June 12, 2025, the National Assembly of Vietnam issued Resolution No. 202/2025/QH15 on the reorganization of provincial-level administrative units. Accordingly:

- Vĩnh Long province was established by merging the entire area and population of Bến Tre province, Vĩnh Long province, and Trà Vinh province.

On June 16, 2025, the Standing Committee of the National Assembly of Vietnam issued Resolution No. 1684/NQ-UBTVQH15 on the reorganization of commune-level administrative units in Vĩnh Long province. Accordingly:

- Nhơn Phú commune was established by merging the entire area and population of Mỹ An commune, Nhơn Phú commune, and Mỹ Phước commune (formerly part of Mang Thít district).
