= Chợ Lách =

Chợ Lách Xã Chợ Lách
- Commune
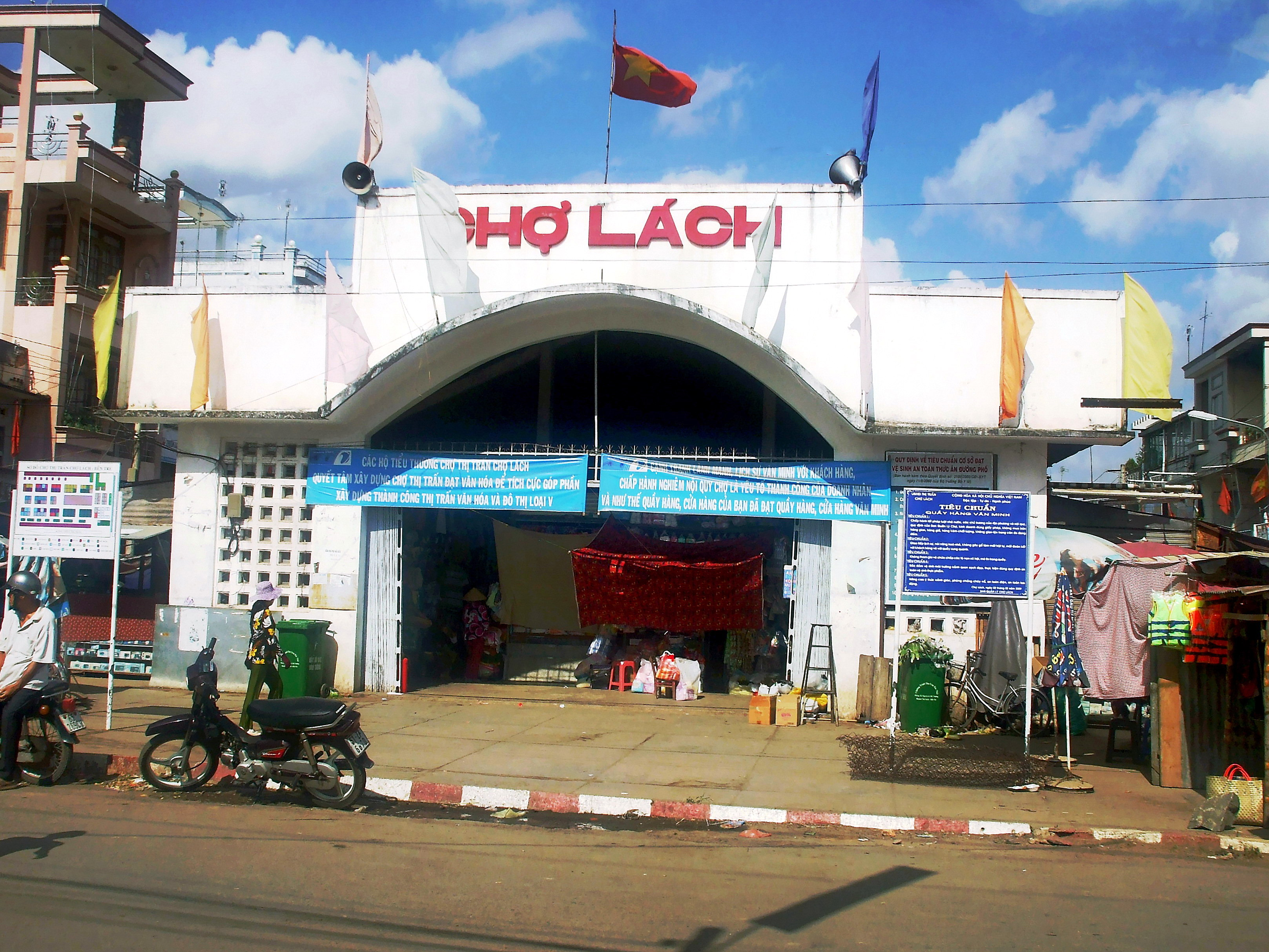
- Chợ Lách

- Location in Vietnam
- Coordinates: 10.264722°N 106.13°E
- Country: Vietnam
- Province: Vĩnh Long Province

Area
  - Total: 3.14 sq mi (8.13 km^{2})

Population
  - Total: 11,836
  - Density: 3,770/sq mi (1,455/km^{2})
- Time zone: UTC+07:00

Chợ Lách is a commune (xã) of Vĩnh Long Province, Vietnam.

== Geography ==
Chợ Lách is a commune situated in the northwestern part of Vĩnh Long Province. It lies approximately 25 km east of Long Châu, 35 km west of An Hội, and 60 km northwest of Trà Vinh. Formerly part of Chợ Lách District in Bến Tre Province, the commune has the following geographical boundaries:

- To the east, it borders Vĩnh Thành.
- To the west, it borders Phú Phụng.
- To the south, it borders Cái Nhum, with the Cổ Chiên River serving as the boundary.
- To the northeast, it borders Tân Phú, with the Hàm Luông River serving as the boundary.
- To the northwest, it borders Ngũ Hiệp Commune (Đồng Tháp Province), with the Mỹ Tho River serving as the boundary. According to Official Dispatch No. 2896/BNV-CQĐP dated May 27, 2025, issued by the Ministry of Home Affairs, following the administrative reorganization, Chợ Lách Commune covers an area of 49.72 km² and has a population of 44,316 as of December 31, 2024, resulting in a population density of 0 people/km² (statistical data calculated as of December 31, 2024, in accordance with Article 6 of Resolution No. 76/2025/UBTVQH15, dated April 14, 2025, of the National Assembly Standing Committee).

== Administration divisions ==
Chợ Lách Commune is divided into 26 hamlets: 1, 2, 3, 4, An Hòa, An Quy, An Thạnh, Bình An, Bình An A, Bình An B, Bình Thanh, Đại An, Định Bình, Hòa An, Hòa Thạnh, Hưng Nhơn, Long Hiệp, Long Hòa, Long Huê, Long Quới, Long Vinh, Nhơn Phú, Quân An, Sơn Qui, Tân An, and Thới Định.

== History ==
On February 24, 1976, the Provisional Revolutionary Government of the Republic of South Vietnam issued a Decree regarding the dissolution of administrative zones and the consolidation of provinces in South Vietnam. Pursuant to this decree, the province of Kiến Hòa was renamed Bến Tre Province.

At that time, Chợ Lách Town—along with the communes of Long Thới and Hòa Nghĩa—belonged to Chợ Lách District within Bến Tre Province. Furthermore, Chợ Lách Town served as the district seat of Chợ Lách District, Bến Tre Province.

On March 14, 1984, the Council of Ministers issued Decision No. 41-HĐBT regarding the delineation of administrative boundaries for communes, towns, and townships within Bến Tre Province. Consequently, the natural land area and population of Sơn Quy Hamlet, two-thirds of Bình An Hamlet, and one-sixth of Phụng Châu Hamlet—all formerly part of Sơn Định Commune—were transferred to the administrative jurisdiction of Chợ Lách Town.

On February 9, 2009, the Government issued Decree No. 08/NĐ-CP regarding the adjustment of administrative boundaries for communes and wards to establish new administrative units within Mỏ Cày District, Chợ Lách District, and Bến Tre Town; the decree also adjusted the administrative boundaries of Mỏ Cày District and Chợ Lách District to establish Mỏ Cày Bắc District within Bến Tre Province. Accordingly:

- The district of Mỏ Cày Bắc is established based on the entire natural area and population size of:
  1. 11 communes of the former district of Mỏ Cày: Thanh Tân, Thạnh Ngãi, Tân Phú Tây, Tân Thành Bình, Thành An, Phước Mỹ Trung, Tân Thanh Tây, Tân Bình, Nhuận Phú Tân, Hoà Lộc, and Khánh Thạnh Tân.
  2. 2 communes of the district of Chợ Lách: Hưng Khánh Trung A and Phú Mỹ.
- The remaining portion of the district of Mỏ Cày is renamed the district of Mỏ Cày Nam, comprising Mỏ Cày Town and 17 communes: Định Thuỷ, Phước Hiệp, An Thạnh, Đa Phước Hội, Thành Thới B, Bình Khánh Đông, Bình Khánh Tây, An Định, An Thới, Thành Thới A, Hương Mỹ, Cẩm Sơn, Ngãi Đăng, Minh Đức, Tân Trung, and Tân Hội.
- The remaining portion of the district of Chợ Lách comprises Chợ Lách Town and the communes of: Hoà Nghĩa, Phú Phụng, Sơn Định, Vĩnh Bình, Long Thới, Tân Thiềng, Vĩnh Thành, Vĩnh Hoà, Phú Sơn, and Hưng Khánh Trung B.
- Henceforth, Chợ Lách Town and the communes of Long Thới and Hòa Nghĩa belong to the district of Chợ Lách in the province of Bến Tre. Concurrently, Chợ Lách Town serves as the district seat of the district of Chợ Lách in the province of Bến Tre. In 2013, Chợ Lách Town was recognized as a Grade V urban area.

On April 19, 2020, Chợ Lách Town was recognized as a civilized urban area.

On June 12, 2025, the 15th National Assembly issued Resolution No. 202/2025/QH15 regarding the arrangement of provincial-level administrative units. Accordingly, the entire natural area and population of the provinces of Bến Tre, Vĩnh Long, and Trà Vinh are to be consolidated into a new province named Vĩnh Long.

On June 16, 2025, the National Assembly Standing Committee issued Resolution No. 1687/NQ-UBTVQH15 regarding the reorganization of commune-level administrative units within Vĩnh Long Province in 2025 (effective from June 16, 2025). Accordingly, the entire natural area and population of the former Chợ Lách Town, along with the communes of Long Thới and Hòa Nghĩa—all located within Chợ Lách District, Bến Tre Province—are to be consolidated into a new commune named Chợ Lách Commune (Clause 64, Article 1).
