= Chợ Lách district =

Coordinates: 10.200°N 106.167°E

Chợ Lách district Huyện Chợ Lách
- District
- Seal

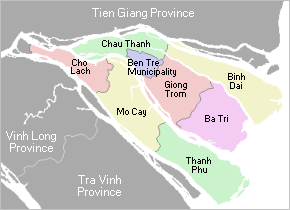
- Location in Bến Tre province
- Country: Vietnam
- Province: Bến Tre province
- Capital: Chợ Lách

Area
  - District: 73 sq mi (189 km^{2})

Population (2019 census)
  - District: 111,418
  - Density: 1,530/sq mi (590/km^{2})
  - Urban: 8,277
  - Rural: 103,141
- Time zone: UTC+7 (Indochina Time)

Chợ Lách is a rural district (huyện) of Bến Tre province in the Mekong Delta region of Vietnam.

== History ==
As of 2019, the district had a population of 111,418. The district covers an area of 189 km^{2}. The district capital lies at Chợ Lách. The district capital lies on Provincial Highway 57 and is 45 km west of Bến Tre and 20 km east of Vĩnh Long.

The district capital was formed by Decree No. 41/HĐBT on March 14, 1984 by the Vietnamese Cabinet. The capital comprises the following hamlets: Sơn Quy, two thirds of Bình An and one sixth of Phụng Châu of Sơn Định commune. Chợ Lách's name means "Lách Market", and is derived from the presence of a market in the area in the vicinity of many "lau lách" trees.
