= Cầu Ngang =

Cầu Ngang Xã Cầu Ngang
- Commune
- Cầu Ngang commune
- Location within Vietnam
- Coordinates: 9°47′42″N 106°27′8″E
- Country: Vietnam
- Region: Mekong Delta
- Province: Vĩnh Long
- Establish: June 16, 2025

Area
  - Total: 35.32 km^{2} (13.64 sq mi)

Population 2025
  - Total: 28.986 people
  - Density: 0.8207/km^{2} (2.126/sq mi)
- Time zone: UTC+7 (UTC + 7)

Cầu Ngang is a commune (xã) of Vĩnh Long Province, Vietnam.

== Geography ==
Cầu Ngang Commune is situated 8 km from the East Sea, with the following geographical boundaries:

- To the east, it borders Mỹ Long.
- To the west, it borders Nhị Trường.
- To the south, it borders Hiệp Mỹ.
- To the north, it borders Vinh Kim.

Cầu Ngang Commune covers an area of 35.32 km²; as of 2025, it has a population of 28,986 people, resulting in a population density of approximately 821 people/km².

== Administration ==
Cầu Ngang Commune is divided into 18 hamlets: Bào Sen, Bờ Kinh 1, Bờ Kinh 2, Cẩm Hương, Hòa Hưng, Hòa Thịnh, Minh Thuận A, Minh Thuận B, Mỹ Cẩm A, Mỹ Cẩm B, Nô Công, Rạch, Sóc Chùa, Sóc Hoang, Thuận An, Thuận Hiệp, Thủy Hòa, and Trà Kim.

== History ==
On November 23, 1991, the Government Organization Committee issued a Decision regarding the establishment of Cầu Ngang Town, based on the adjustment of a portion of the area and population of Mỹ Hòa Commune.

On October 15, 2019, the People's Council of Trà Vinh Province issued Resolution 157/NQ-HĐND regarding the merger of Thống Nhất Hamlet into Mỹ Cẩm A Hamlet.

Cầu Ngang Town is divided into three hamlets: Minh Thuận A, Minh Thuận B, and Mỹ Cẩm A.

On June 16, 2025, the National Assembly Standing Committee issued Resolution No. 1687/NQ-UBTVQH15 regarding the reorganization of commune-level administrative units in Vĩnh Long Province in 2025. Accordingly, the entire natural area and population of Cau Ngang Town, along with the communes of My Hoa and Thuan Hoa, were consolidated to form a new commune named Cau Ngang Commune.

Following the merger, Cau Ngang Commune encompasses a natural area of 35.32 km² and has a population of 28,986 people.
