= Long Hồ district =

Coordinates: 10.283°N 106.000°E

Long Hồ district Huyện Long Hồ
- District
- Interactive map of Long Hồ district
- Country: Vietnam
- Region: Mekong Delta
- Province: Vĩnh Long
- Capital: Long Hồ

Area
  - Total: 75 sq mi (193 km^{2})

Population (2018)
  - Total: 160,537
  - Density: 2,150/sq mi (832/km^{2})
- Time zone: UTC+7 (UTC + 7)

Long Hồ was also the name of the Vĩnh Long province of Vietnam before 1975.

Long Hồ is a former rural district (huyện) of Vĩnh Long province, in the Mekong Delta region of Vietnam. As of 2003 the district had a population of 151,996. The district covers an area of 193 km^{2} (75 sq mi). The district capital lies at Long Hồ.
