= Cái Nhum =

- Commune
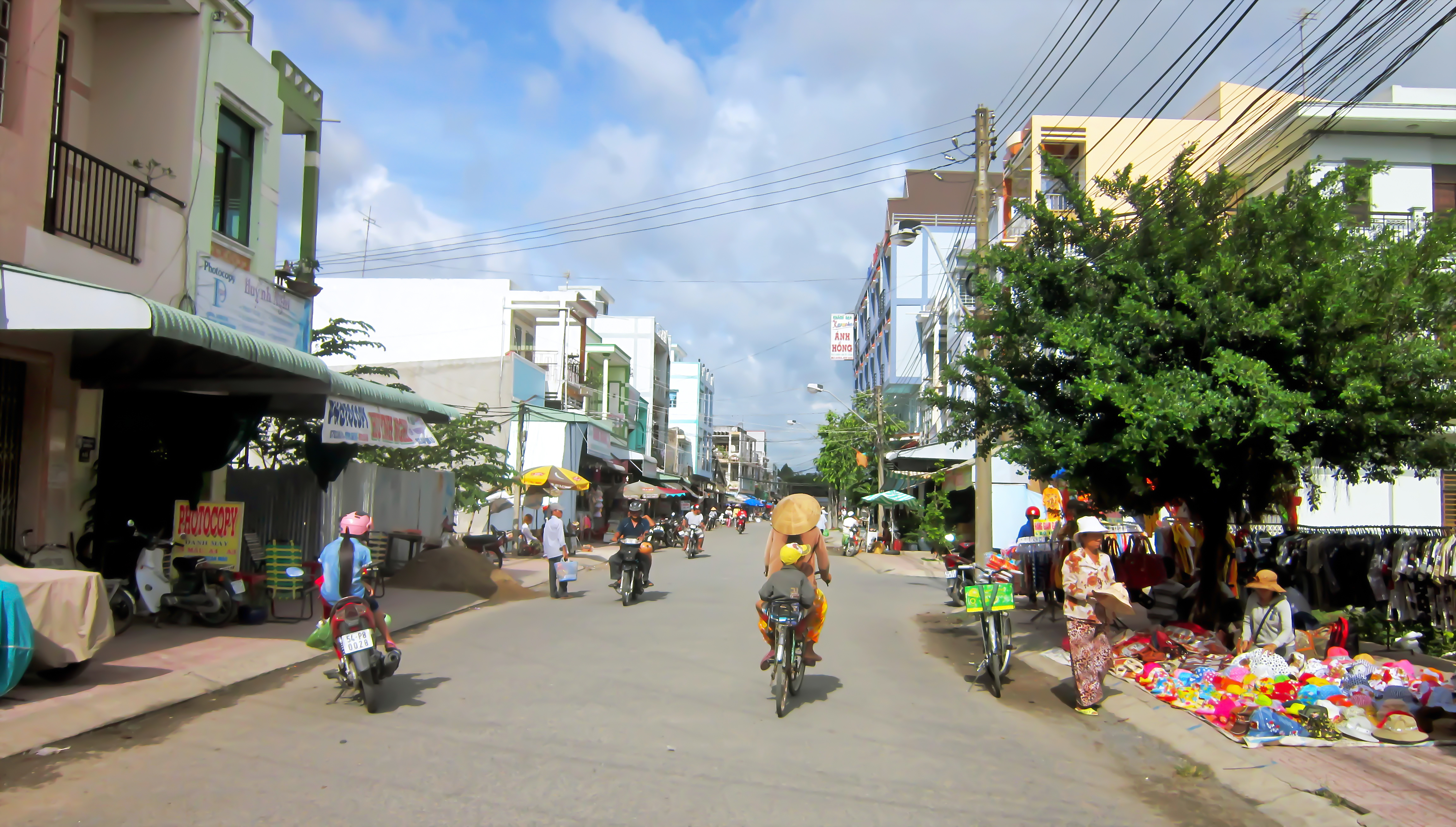
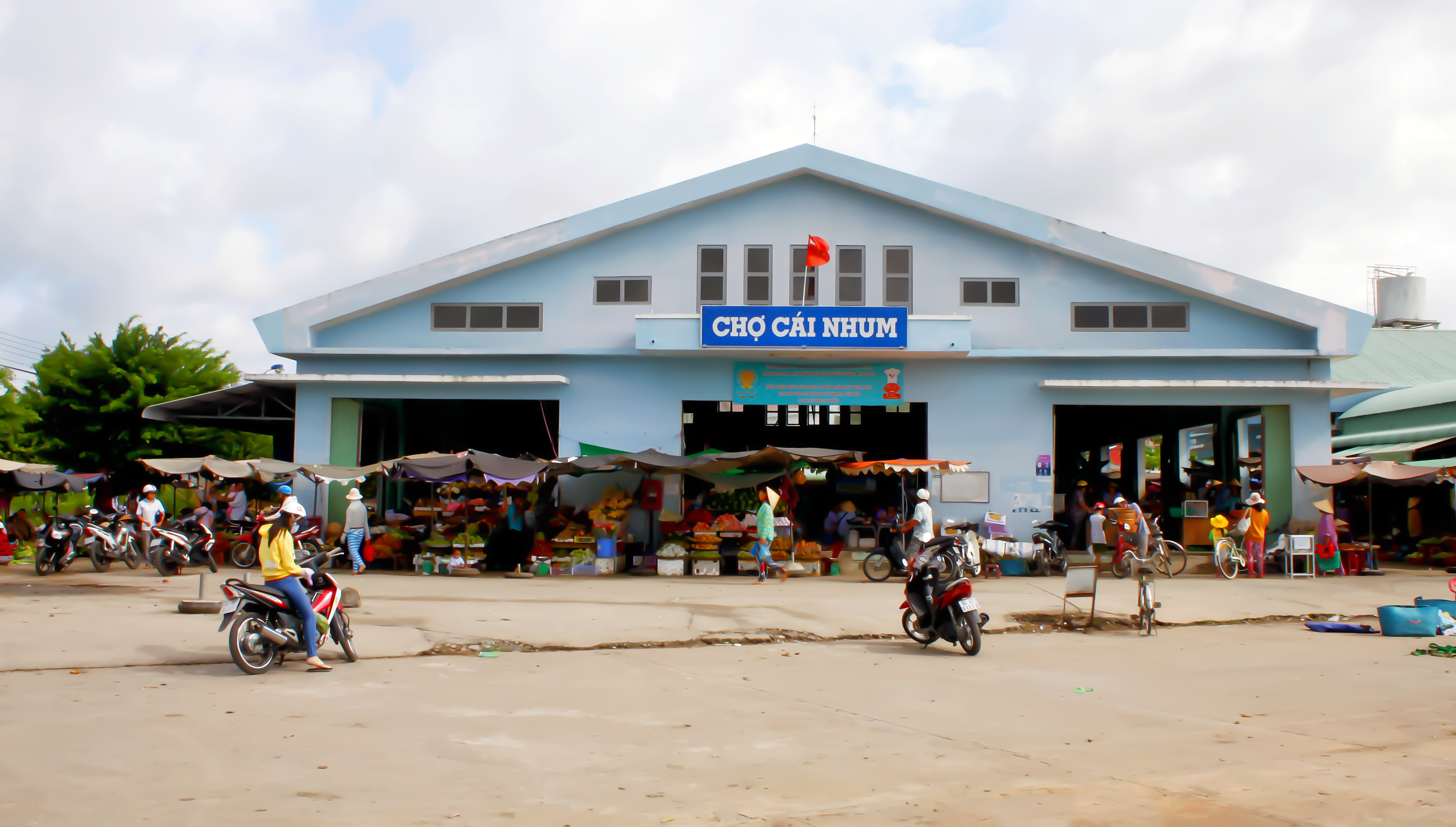
- From top to bottom: A road in the center of Cái Nhum commune, the new Cái Nhum market.
- Interactive map of Cái Nhum
- Country: Vietnam
- Province: Vĩnh Long
- Establish: June 16, 2025

Area
  - Total: 52.45 km^{2} (20.25 sq mi)

Population
  - Total: 38,538 people
  - Density: 734.8/km^{2} (1,903/sq mi)
- Time zone: UTC+07:00

Cái Nhum is a commune in Vĩnh Long province. It is one of 124 communes and wards in the province after the 2025 reorganization.

== Geography ==
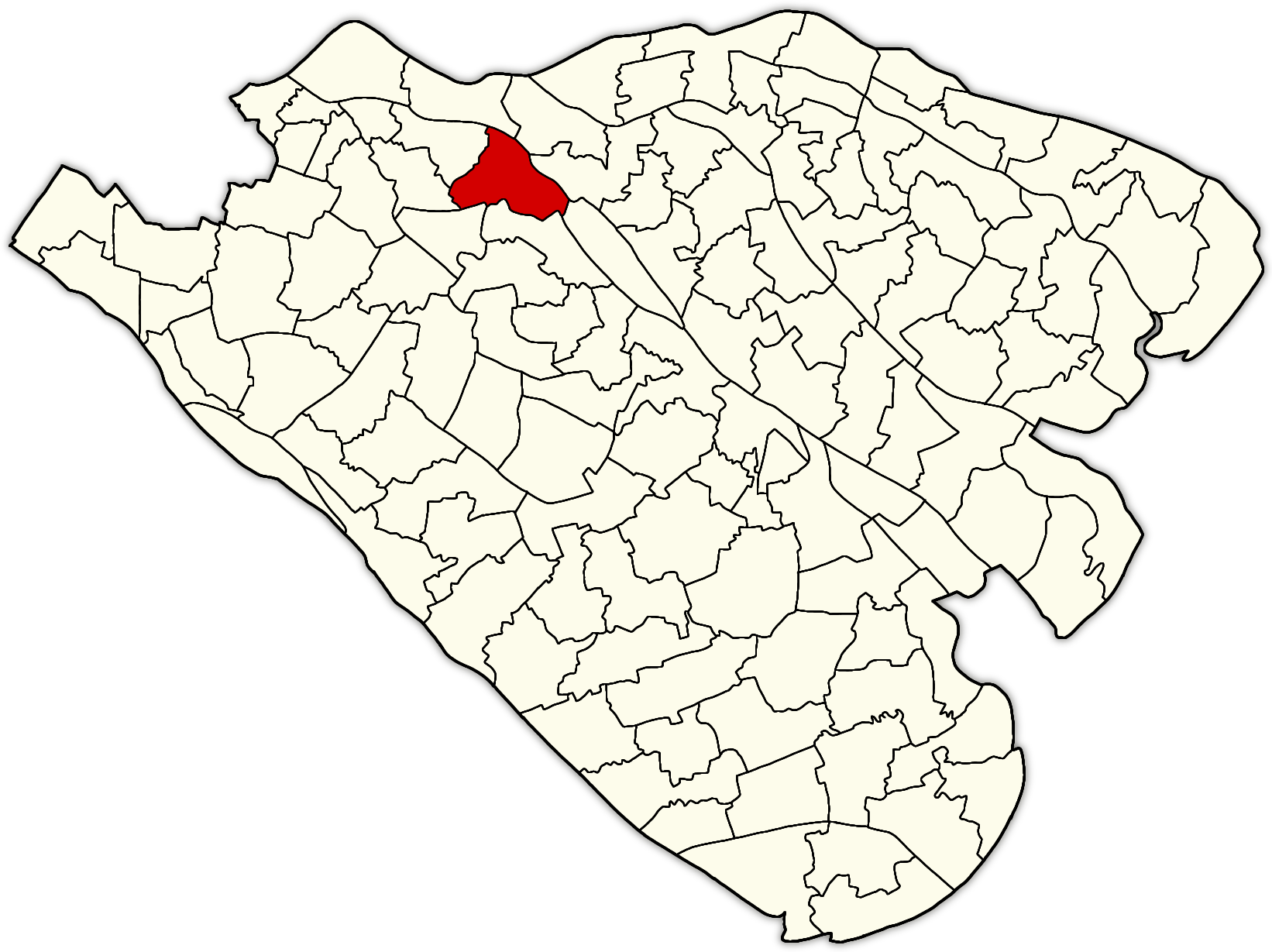
Location of Cái Nhum commune on Vĩnh Long province map (highlight in red).

Cái Nhum commune has the following geographical location:

- To the north, it borders Phú Phụng commune and Chợ Lách commune.
- To the west, it borders Nhơn Phú commune and Bình Phước commune.
- To the east, it borders Vĩnh Thành commune.
- To the south, it borders Tân Long Hội, Quới An, and Quới Thiện communes.

== History ==
Prior to 2025, Cái Nhum commune was formerly Cái Nhum commune-level town, An Phước commune, and Chánh An commune, belonging to Mang Thít district, Vĩnh Long province.

On June 12, 2025, the National Assembly of Vietnam issued Resolution No. 202/2025/QH15 on the reorganization of provincial-level administrative units. Accordingly:

- Vĩnh Long province was established by merging the entire area and population of Bến Tre province, Vĩnh Long province and Trà Vinh province.

On June 16, 2025, the Standing Committee of the National Assembly of Vietnam issued Resolution No. 1684/NQ-UBTVQH15 on the reorganization of commune-level administrative units in Vĩnh Long province. Accordingly:

- Cái Nhum commune was established by merging the entire area and population of Cái Nhum commune-level town, An Phước commune, and Chánh An commune (formerly part of Mang Thít district).
