= Long Châu =

Ward and capital of Vĩnh Long province, Vietnam

- Ward
- A view in Long Châu ward
- Interactive map of Long Châu
- Country: Vietnam
- Province: Vĩnh Long
- Establish: June 16, 2025
- People's Committee: 08, Võ Văn Kiệt street, Long Châu ward

Area
  - Total: 12.63 km^{2} (4.88 sq mi)

Population
  - Total: 49,480 people
  - Density: 3,918/km^{2} (10,150/sq mi)
- Time zone: UTC+07:00

Long Châu is a ward and capital of Vĩnh Long province, Vietnam. It is one of the 124 wards and communes in the province following the 2025 reorganization. Long Châu has an area of 12.63 km², and its population in 2025 is projected to be 49,480 people.

== Geography ==
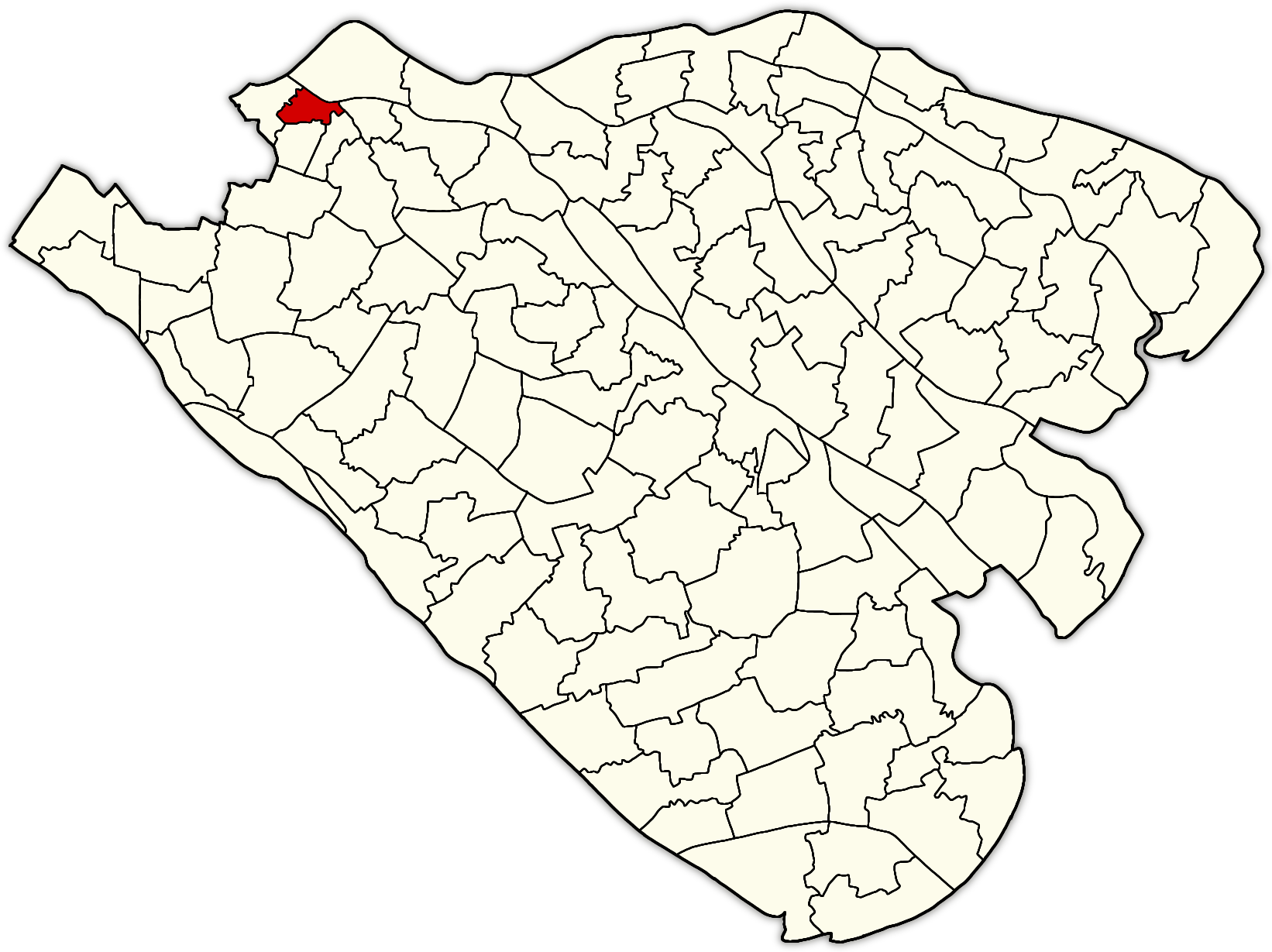
Location of Long Châu ward in Vĩnh Long province map (highlight in red).

Long Châu is a ward in Vĩnh Long province, serving as the administrative center of Vĩnh Long province. The ward has the following geographical location:

- To the north, it borders An Bình commune (separated by the Cổ Chiên river).
- To the south, it borders Phước Hậu ward and Tân Hạnh ward.
- To the west, it borders Tân Ngãi ward.
- To the east, it borders Thanh Đức ward.

== History ==
Prior to 2025, the current Long Châu ward was formerly ward 1, ward 9, and Trường An ward of Vĩnh Long city, Vĩnh Long province.

On June 12, 2025, the National Assembly of Vietnam issued Resolution No. 202/2025/QH15 on the reorganization of provincial-level administrative units. Accordingly:

- Vĩnh Long province was established by merging the entire area and population of Bến Tre province, Vĩnh Long province, Trà Vinh province.
- After the reorganization, the new Vĩnh Long province has an area of 6,296.20 km^{2} and a population of 4,386,100 people, with a population density of 696 people/km^{2}.

On June 16, 2025, the Standing Committee of the National Assembly of Vietnam issued Resolution No. 1687/NQ-UBTVQH15 on the reorganization of commune-level administrative units in Vĩnh Long province. Accordingly:

- Long Châu ward was established by merging the entire area and population of the ward 1, 9 and Trường An ward (part of the former Vĩnh Long city).

== Administrative divisions ==
Long Châu ward is divided into 21 neighborhoods: 1, 2, 3, 4, 5, 6, 7, 8, 9, 10, 11, 12, Hùng Vương, Hưng Đạo Vương, Lê Văn Tám, Nguyễn Du, Nguyễn Thái Học, Tân Quới Đông, Tân Quới Tây, Tân Quới Hưng, Tân Vĩnh.
