= Mỹ Thuận, Vĩnh Long =

Mỹ Thuận
- Commune
- Interactive map of Mỹ Thuận
- Coordinates: 10°07′52″N 105°49′18″E
- Country: Vietnam
- Province: Vĩnh Long
- Time zone: UTC+07:00 (Indochina Time)

Mỹ Thuận is a rural commune (xã) of Vĩnh Long Province, Vietnam.
