= Mang Thít district =

Coordinates: 10.167°N 106.167°E

Mang Thít district Huyện Mang Thít
- District
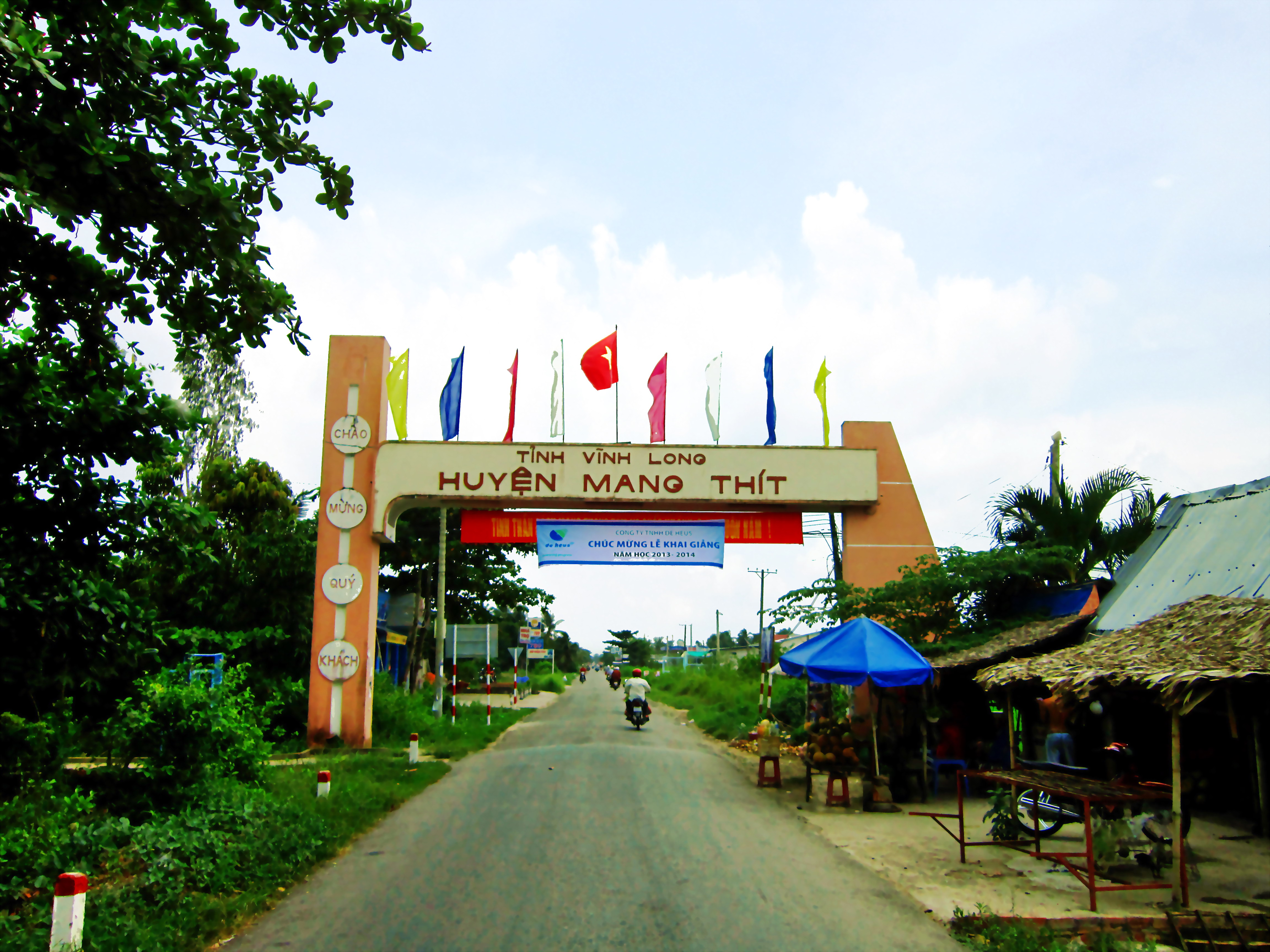
- Road to Mang Thít district

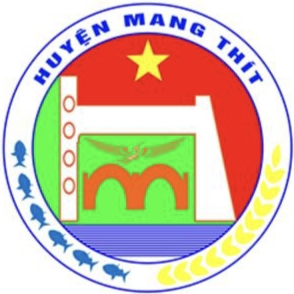
- Seal
- Interactive map of Mang Thít district
- Country: Vietnam
- Region: Mekong Delta
- Province: Vĩnh Long
- Capital: Cái Nhum

Area
  - Total: 61 sq mi (158 km^{2})

Population (2018)
  - Total: 103,573
  - Density: 1,700/sq mi (656/km^{2})
- Time zone: UTC+7 (UTC + 7)

Mang Thít is a rural district of Vĩnh Long province, in the Mekong Delta region of Vietnam. As of 2003, the district had a population of 101,942. The district covers an area of 158 km^{2} (61 sq mi). Its capital lies at Cái Nhum.
