= Long Hồ =

Long Hồ Phường Long Hồ
- Ward
- Long Hồ ward
- Location within Vietnam
- Coordinates: 10°11′41″N 106°00′39″E
- Country: Vietnam
- Region: Mekong Delta
- Province: Vĩnh Long
- Time zone: UTC+7 (UTC + 7)

Long Hồ is a ward (phường) of Vĩnh Long Province, Vietnam.
