= Vĩnh Long province =

Province of Vietnam

Vĩnh Long
- Province
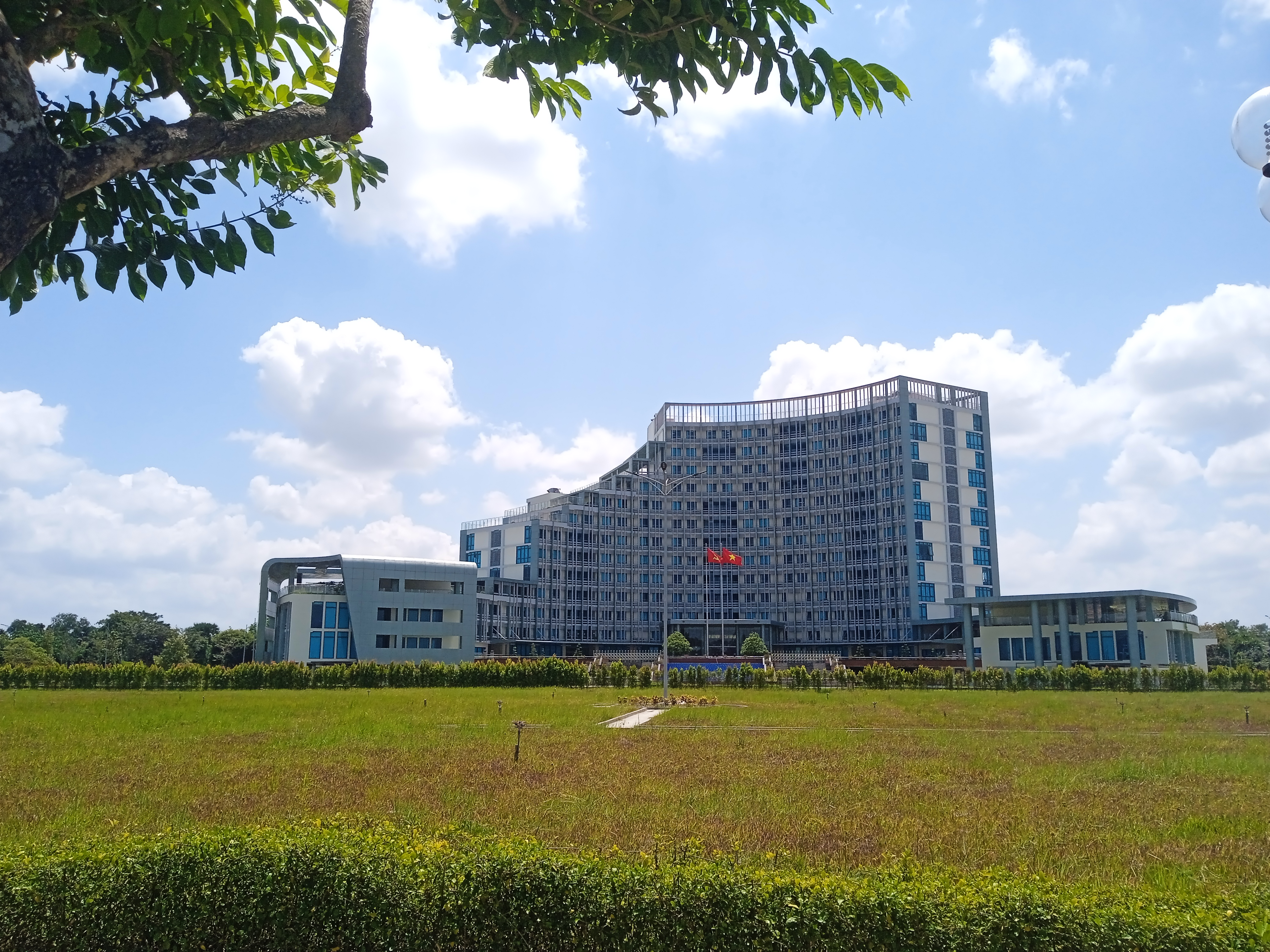

- Seal
- Etymology: "Eternal Prosperity"
- Location of Vĩnh Long within Vietnam
- Coordinates: 10°10′N 106°0′E
- Country: Vietnam
- Region: Mekong Delta
- Capital: Long Châu ward
- Subdivisions: 19 wards, 105 communes.

Government
  - Party Secretary: Trần Văn Lâu
  - People's Council Chair: Nguyễn Minh Dũng
  - People's Committee Chair: Trần Trí Quang

Area
  - Total: 6,296.20 km^{2} (2,430.98 sq mi)

Population (2024)
  - Total: 4,257,581
  - Density: 676.214/km^{2} (1,751.39/sq mi)

Demographics
  - Ethnicities: Vietnamese, Khmer, Hoa, Chăm

GDP
  - Total: VND 47.121 trillion US$ 2.047 billion
- Time zone: UTC+7 (ICT)
- Calling code: 70
- ISO 3166 code: VN-49
- HDI (2023): ▲0.724 (21st)
- Website: vinhlong.gov.vn

Vĩnh Long (Vietnamese pronunciation: [ʑiŋ˧ˀ˦˥ lɔŋ˧]) is a province located in the Mekong Delta of southwestern Vietnam. Its provincial capital is Long Châu ward. Its population is 4,257,581 and its area is 6,296.20 km^{2} (2,430.98 mi^{2}). After merging with Bến Tre and Trà Vinh provinces. The east of the province has a coastline with the South China Sea.

== Geography ==
Vĩnh Long is a province located in the Mekong Delta region, 23km southwest of Hồ Chí Minh City. The province has a geographical location:

- To the north, it borders Đồng Tháp province.
- To the southwest, it borders Cần Thơ city.
- To the east and southeast, it borders the East Sea.

== Administrative divisions ==
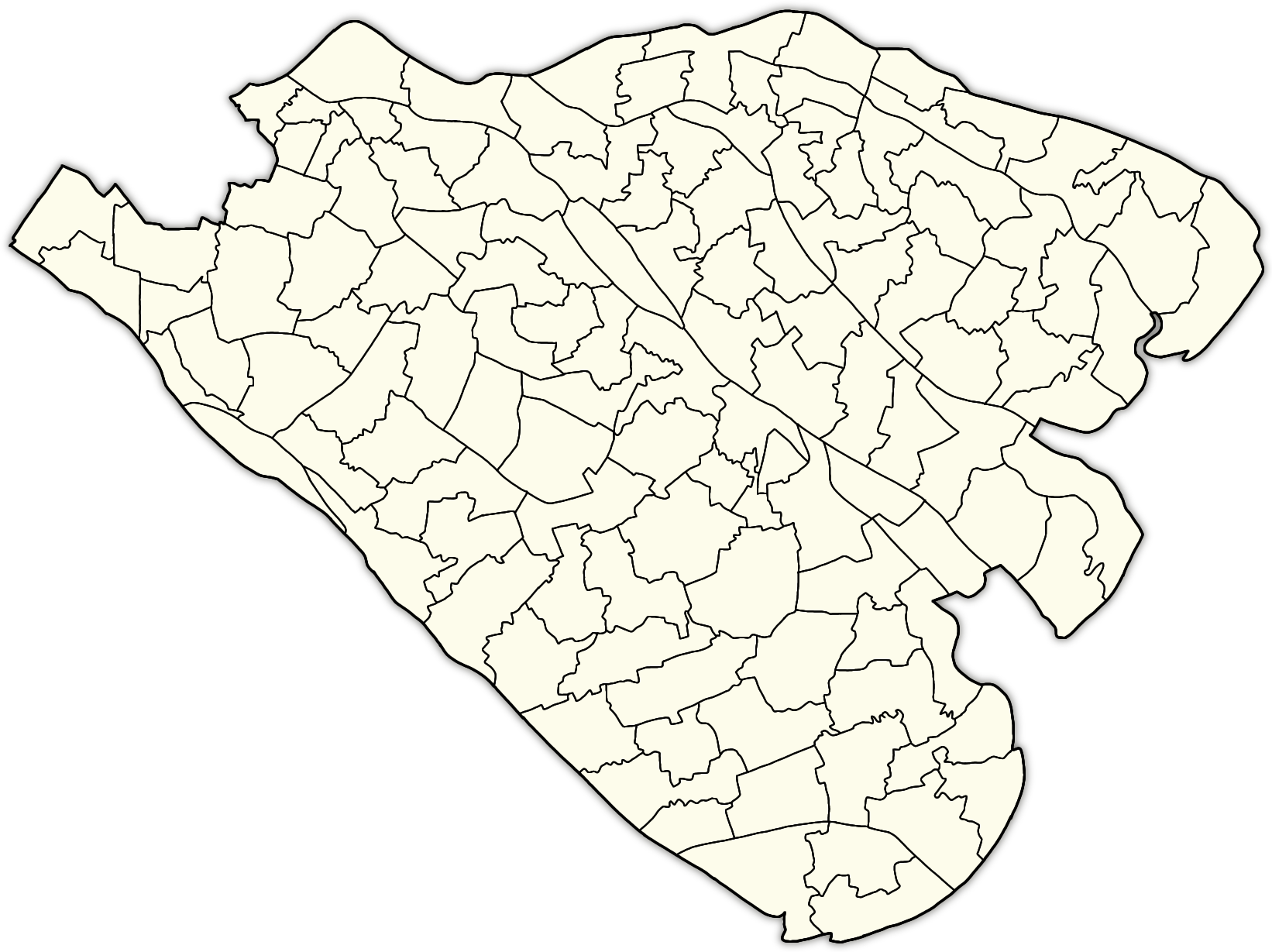
Administrative divisions in Vĩnh Long province

Administratively, Vĩnh Long province is divided into 124 commune-level administrative units, including 19 wards and 105 communes. Include:

- 19 wards: Long Châu, Tân Ngãi, Phước Hậu, Tân Hạnh, Thanh Đức, Bình Minh, Cái Vồn, Đông Thành, Trà Vinh, Nguyệt Hóa, Long Đức, Hòa Thuận, Duyên Hải, Trường Long Hòa, Bến Tre, An Hội, Sơn Đông, Phú Tân, Phú Khương.
- 105 commune: An Bình, Long Hồ, Phú Quới, Cái Nhum, Nhơn Phú, Bình Phước, Tân Long Hội, An Hiệp, An Định, An Ngãi Trung, An Phú Tân, An Qui, An Trường, Ba Tri, Bình Đại, Bảo Thạnh, Bình Phú, Cái Ngang, Càng Long, Cầu Kè, Cầu Ngang, Châu Hòa, Châu Hưng, Châu Thành, Chợ Lách, Đại An, Đại Điền, Đôn Châu, Đông Hải, Đồng Khởi, Giao Long, Giồng Trôm, Hàm Giang, Hiệp Mỹ, Hiếu Phụng, Hiếu Thành, Hòa Bình, Hòa Hiệp, Hòa Minh, Hùng Hòa, Hưng Khánh Trung, Hưng Mỹ, Hưng Nhượng, Hương Mỹ, Lộc Thuận, Long Hiệp, Long Hòa, Long Hữu, Long Thành, Long Vĩnh, Lục Sỹ Thành, Lương Hòa, Lương Phú, Lưu Nghiệp Anh, Mỏ Cày, Mỹ Chánh Hòa, Mỹ Long, Mỹ Thuận, Ngãi Tứ, Ngũ Lạc, Nhị Long, Nhị Trường, Nhuận Phú Tân, Phong Thạnh, Phú Phụng, Phú Thuận, Phú Túc, Phước Long, Phước Mỹ Trung, Quới An, Quới Điền, Quới Thiện, Song Lộc, Song Phú, Tam Bình, Tam Ngãi, Tân An, Tân Hào, Tân Hòa, Tân Lược, Tân Phú, Tân Quới, Tân Thành Bình, Tân Thủy, Tân Xuân, Tập Ngãi, Tập Sơn, Thạnh Hải, Thạnh Phong, Thạnh Phú, Thạnh Phước, Thạnh Thới, Thạnh Trị, Thới Thuận, Tiên Thủy, Tiểu Cần, Trà Côn, Trà Cú, Trà Ôn, Trung Hiệp, Trung Ngãi, Trung Thành, Vinh Kim, Vĩnh Thành, Vĩnh Xuân.

== History ==
=== Under Nguyễn lords ===
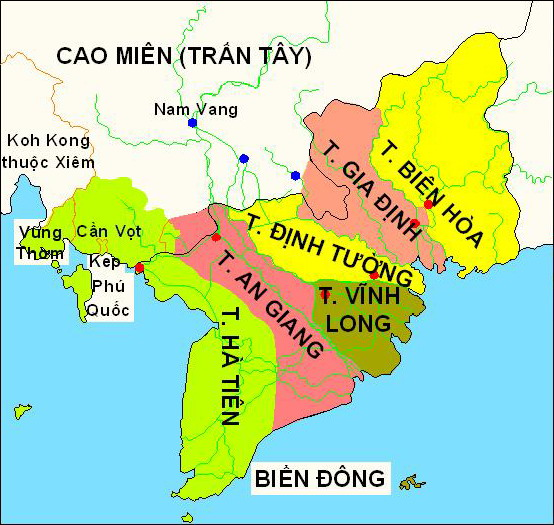
Nam Kỳ Lục tỉnh (1832 - 1841)

In 1731, Trấn Biên commander – Nguyễn Cửu Triêm defeated Chân Lạp rebels at Lật Giang (Bến Lức). In 1732, Phiên Trấn commander – Trần Đại Định led his Long Môn army cooperated with Chân Lạp king – Nặc Tha (Ang Chee)'s army in destroying Chân Lạp rebels at Lô Việt (La Bích). In the same year, Lord Ninh ordered to establish the third district of Gia Định prefecture: Định Viễn district, protected by Long Hồ palace.

In 1757, Chân Lạp king – Nặc Đôn (Ang Tong) died. (Note: Nặc Nguyên (Ang Snguon) died since 1755. Nặc Đôn (Ang Tong) succeeded and reigned till 1757.) The regent Nặc Nhuận paid his two prefectures: Trà Vinh and Ba Thắc as tribute to Lord Võ to get approval as the new king of Chân Lạp. After this, Nặc Nhuận's son-in-law killed him to ascend the crown. Nặc Đôn's grandson, Nặc Tôn (Ang Ton) fled to Hà Tiên seeking for military aid. Lord Võ appointed Nặc Tôn as the new king of Chân Lạp and ordered Mạc Thiên Tứ and his troops to escort Nặc Tôn back. In return, Nặc Tôn ceded the Tầm Phong Long region to Lord Võ. Lord Võ divided this region to three sub-regions: Châu Đốc, Giêng river island, and Đông Khẩu, under the administration of Long Hồ palace.

=== Under Nguyễn dynasty ===
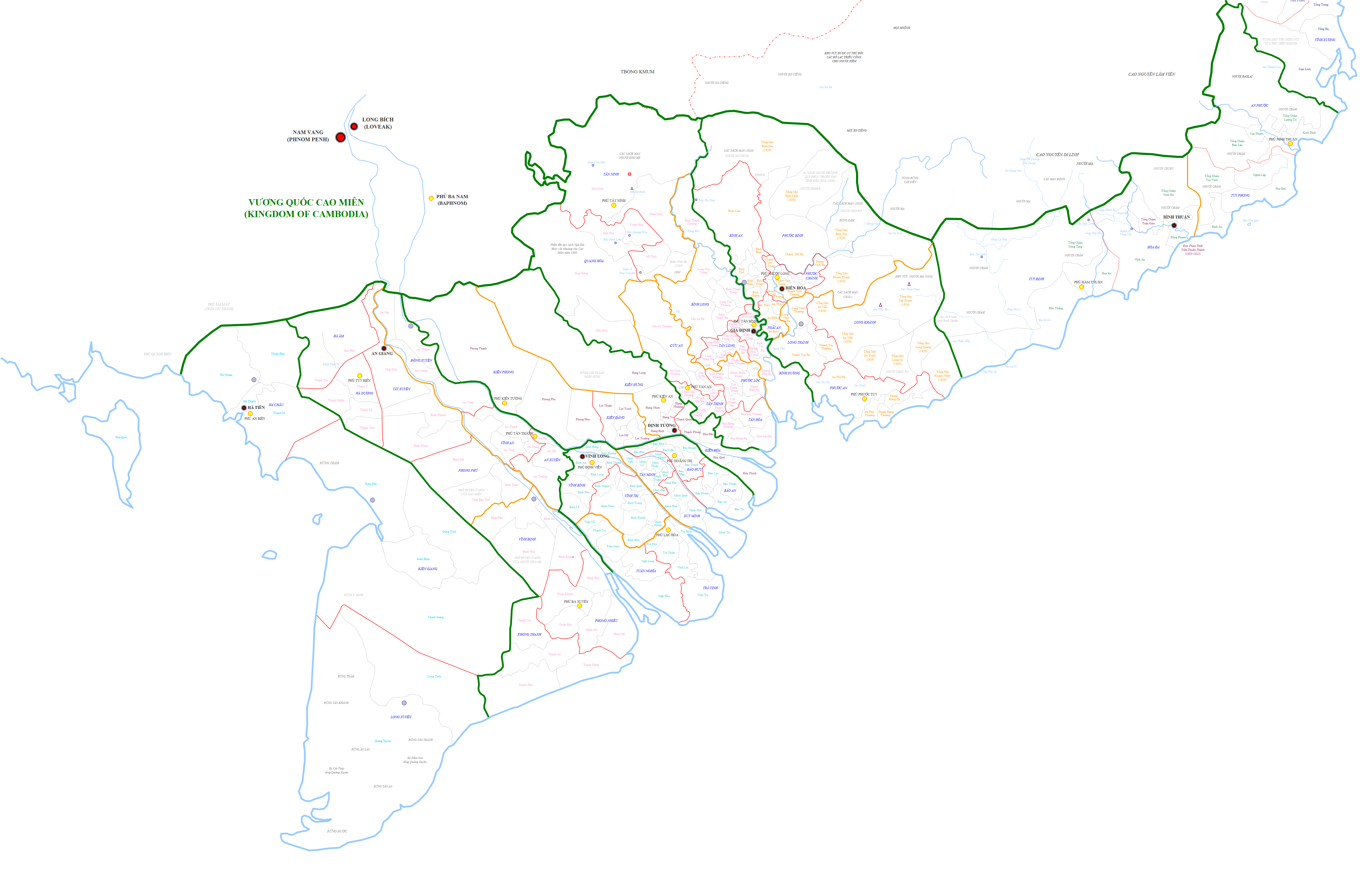
Six Provinces of Lower Cochinchina, and Bình Thuận in 1850

In 1808, Emperor Gia Long renamed Lower Cochinchina from Gia Định trấn to Gia Định thành, its four palaces (dinh): Phiên Trấn, Trấn Biên, Trấn Định, Vĩnh Trấn (Long Hồ) were also renamed to protectorate (trấn): Phiên An, Biên Hoà, Định Tường, Vĩnh Thanh respectively. Định Viễn district was renamed to Định Viễn prefecture. Vĩnh Thanh protectorate contained both Vĩnh Long and An Giang.

Vĩnh Long province was first established in 1832 when Emperor Minh Mạng dissolved Gia Định thành to established Six Provinces. Vĩnh Long province contained three prefectures, divided into six districts. Lê Phúc Bảo was appointed the governor-general of Long – Tường (Vĩnh Long – Định Tường). Under Bảo administration were: Phạm Phúc Thiệu – Vĩnh Long provincial governor, and Tô Trân – Định Tường provincial governor.

By the 4th year under Tự Đức (1851), Vĩnh Long contained three prefectures: Định Viễn, Hoằng Trị, and Lạc Hóa, dividing to eight districts: Vĩnh Bình, Vĩnh Trị, Bảo Hựu, Bảo An, Tân Minh, Duy Minh, Tuân Mỹ, and Trà Vinh.

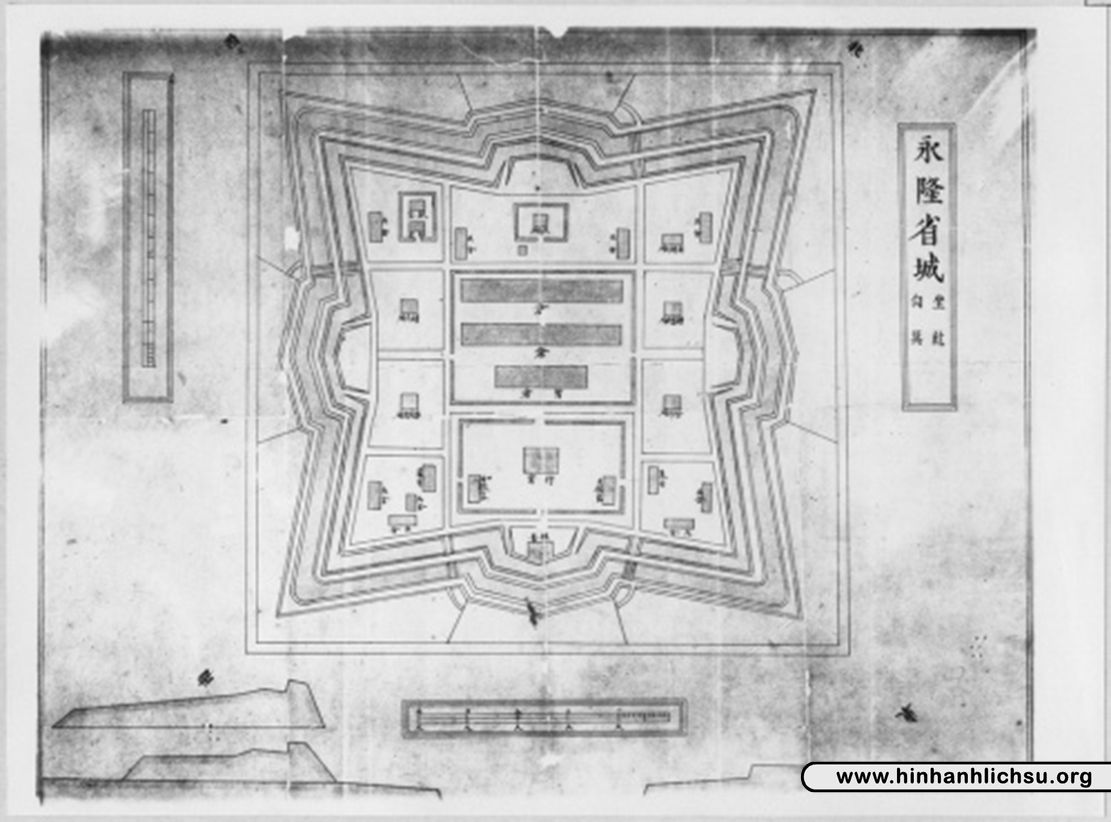
Drawing of Vĩnh Long citadel in the Nguyễn dynasty

=== After August Revolution ===
On April 10, 2009, the Vietnamese Government issued Decree No. 16/ND-CP establishing Vĩnh Long City in Vĩnh Long Province, based on the entire natural area and population of Vĩnh Long Town.

On June 12, 2025, the National Assembly passed Resolution No. 202/2025/QH15 which took effect the same day, merging Bến Tre Province and Trà Vinh Province into Vĩnh Long Province.

== Gallery ==
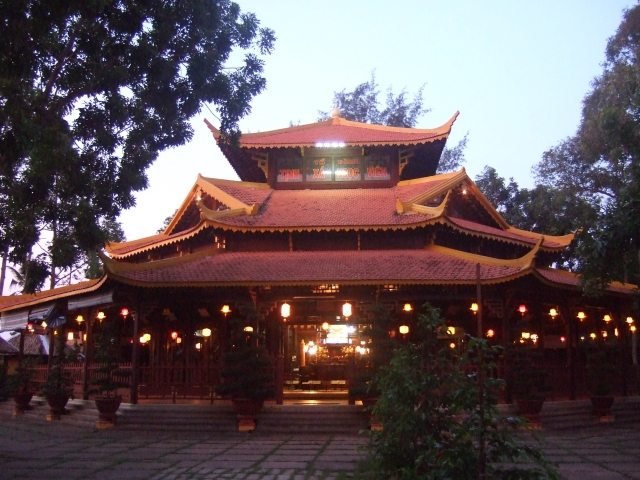
Ngọc Viên Ancestral Temple Vietnamese Mendicant Buddhist Sect

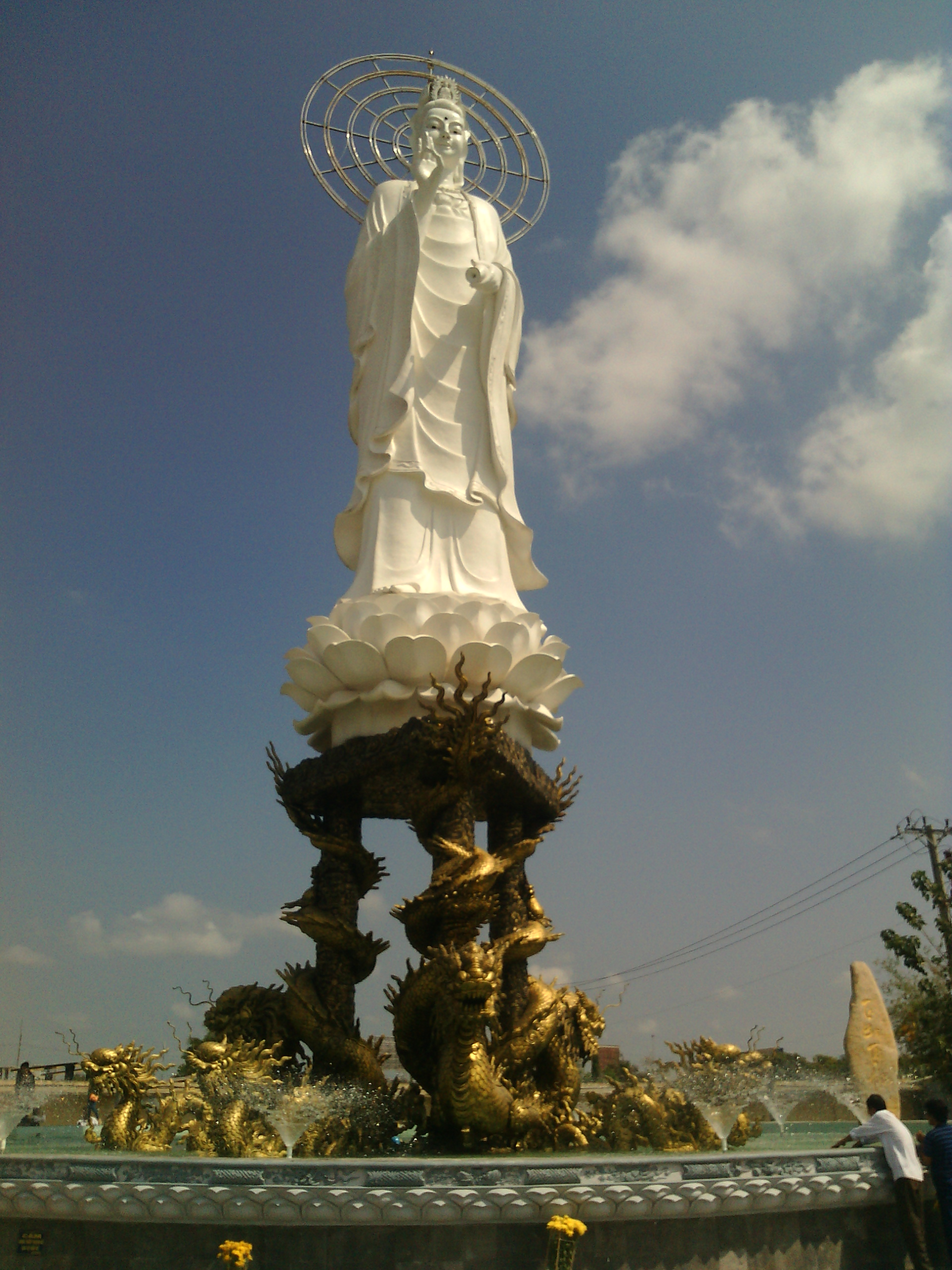
Statue of Guanyin of the Nine Dragons

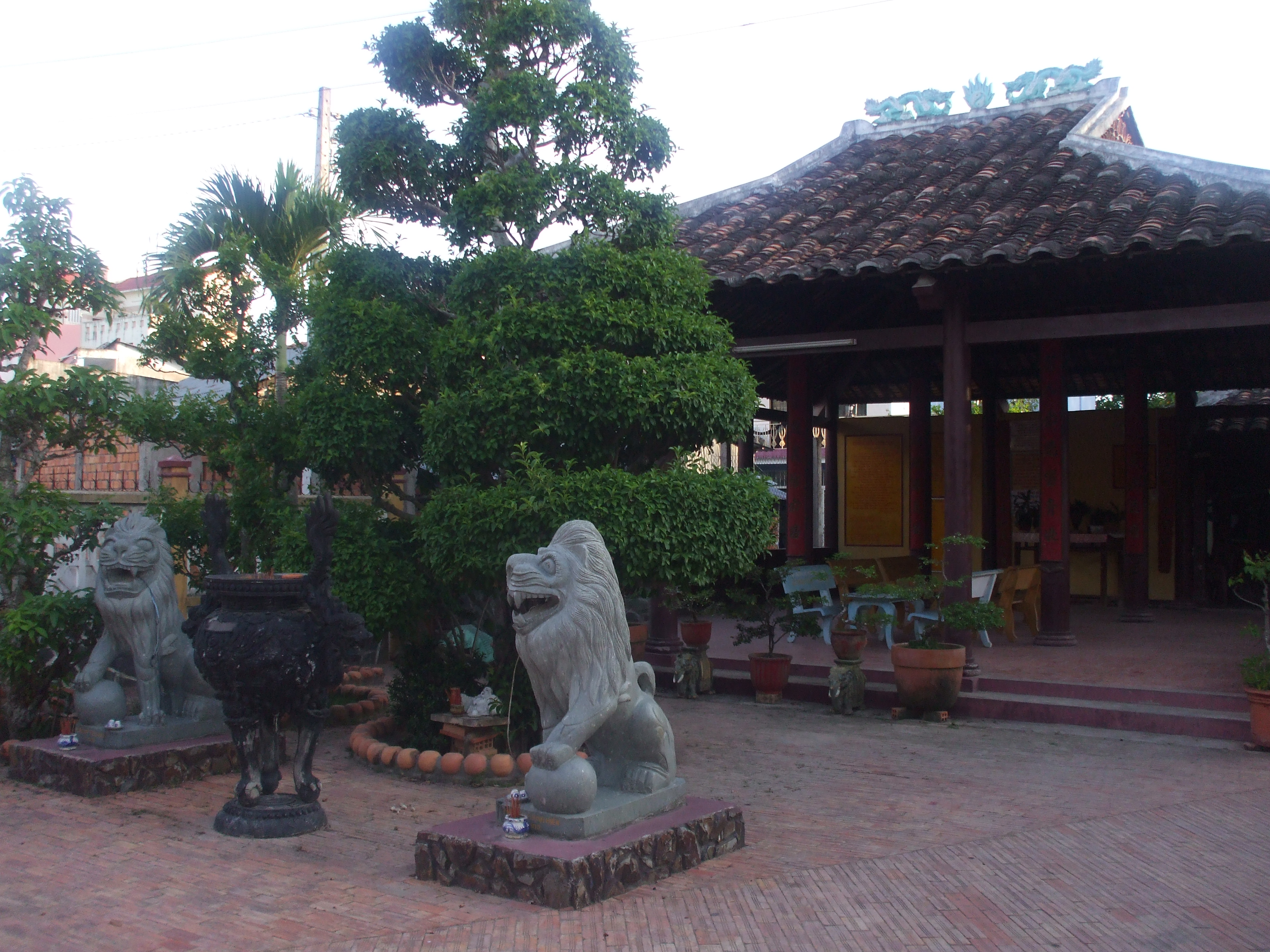
Công Thần Temple

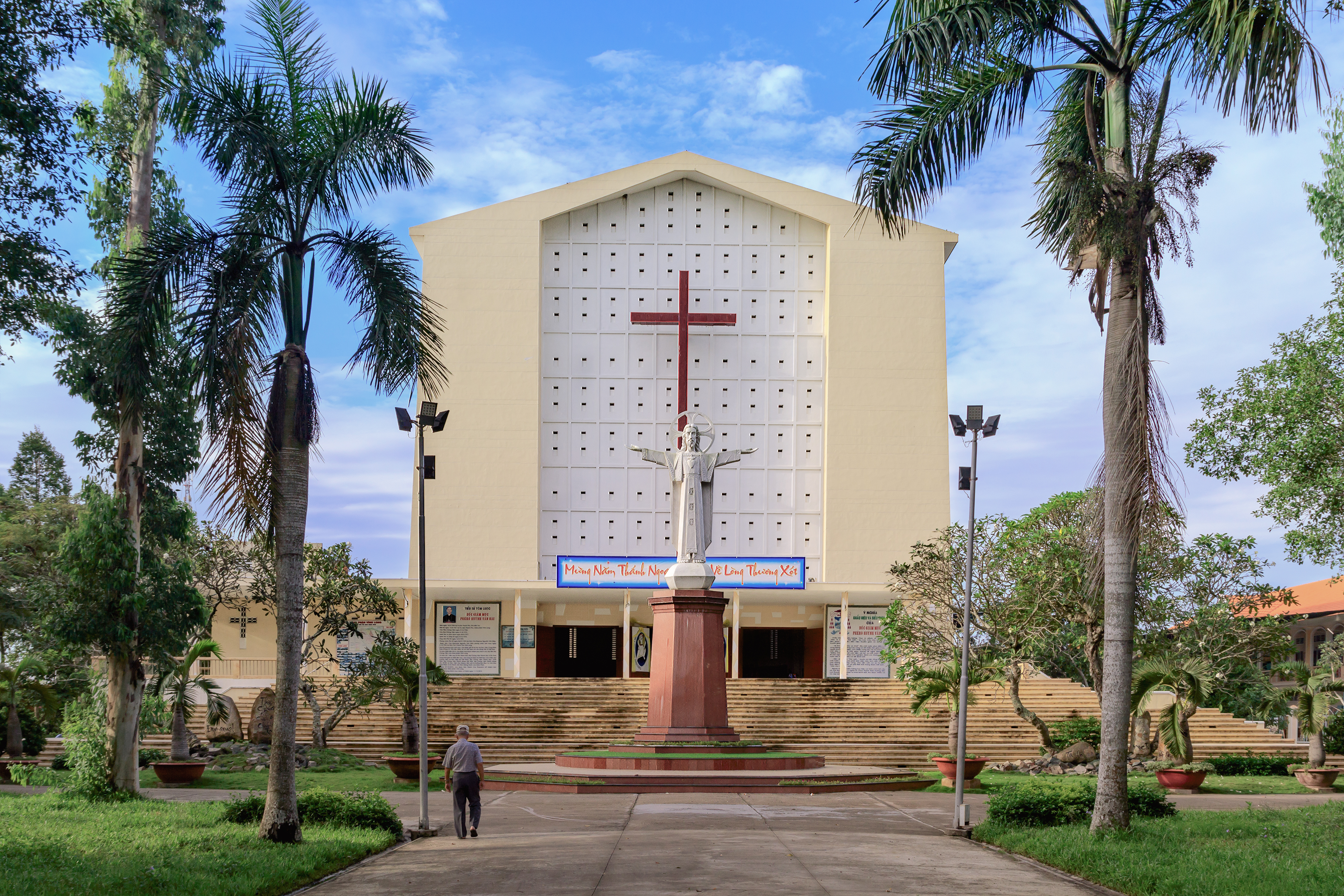
Vĩnh Long Cathedral

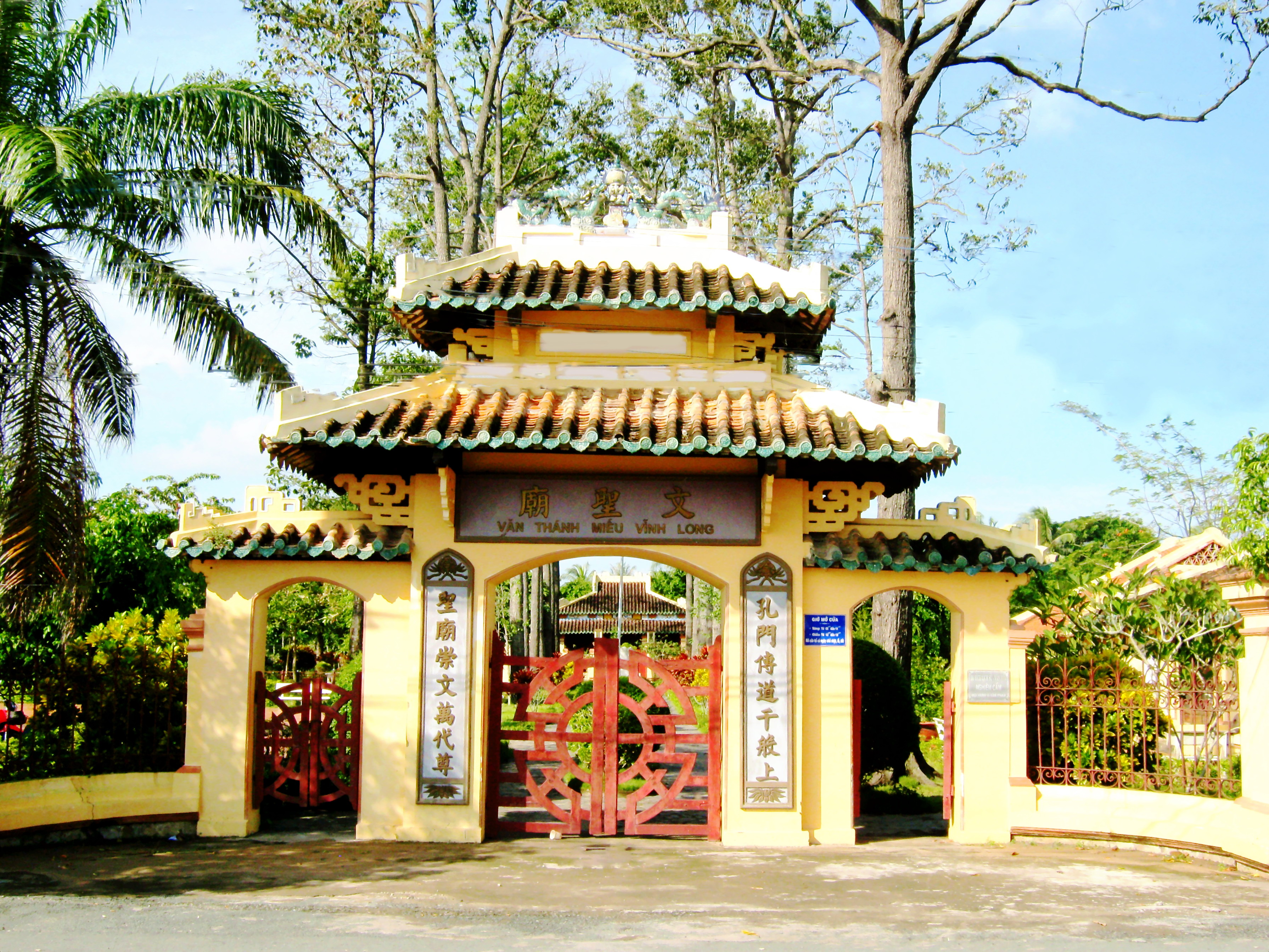
Văn Thánh Temple
