= Vĩnh Long (city) =

Vĩnh Long City Thành phố Vĩnh Long
- Provincial city (Class-2)
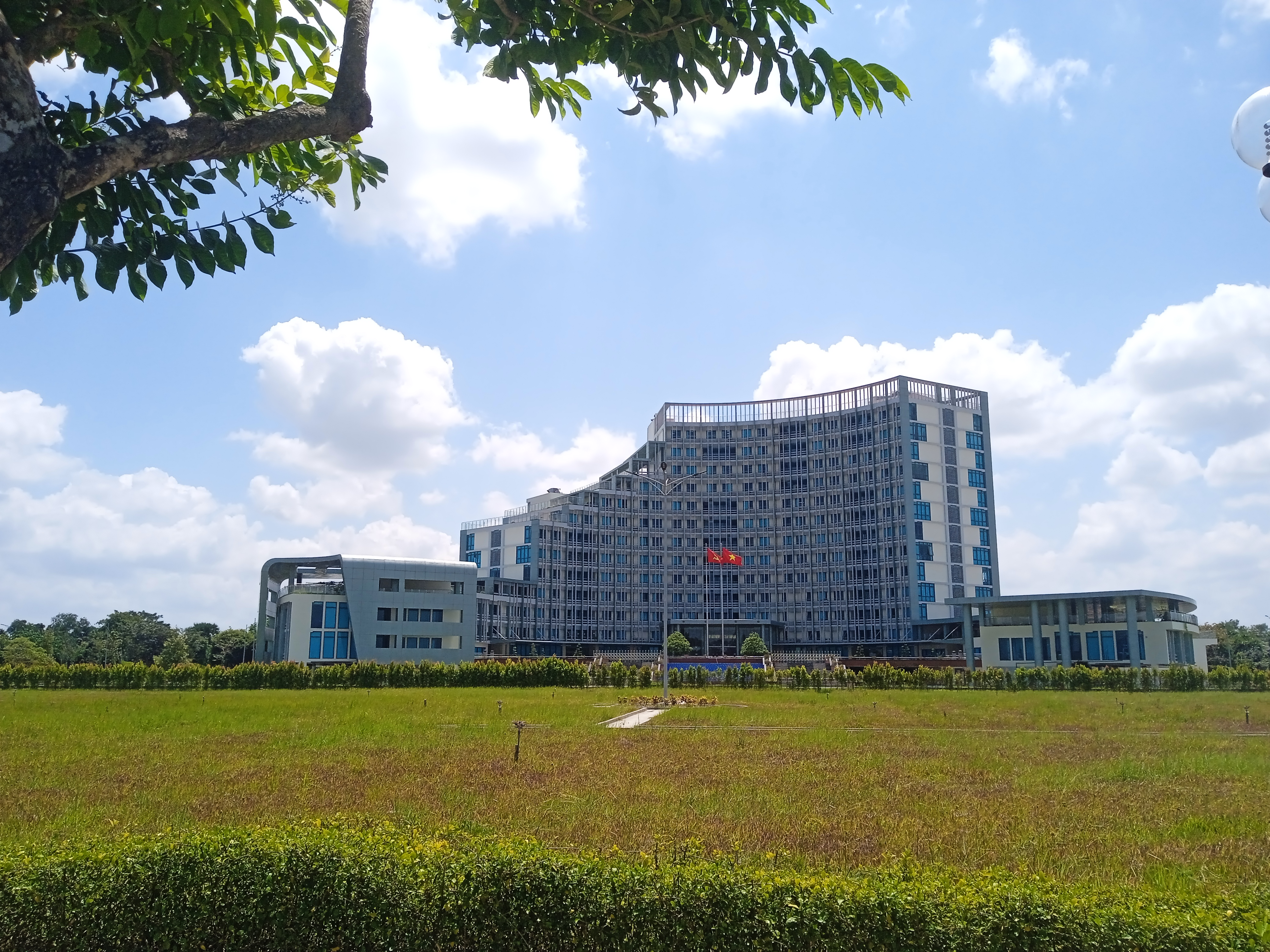
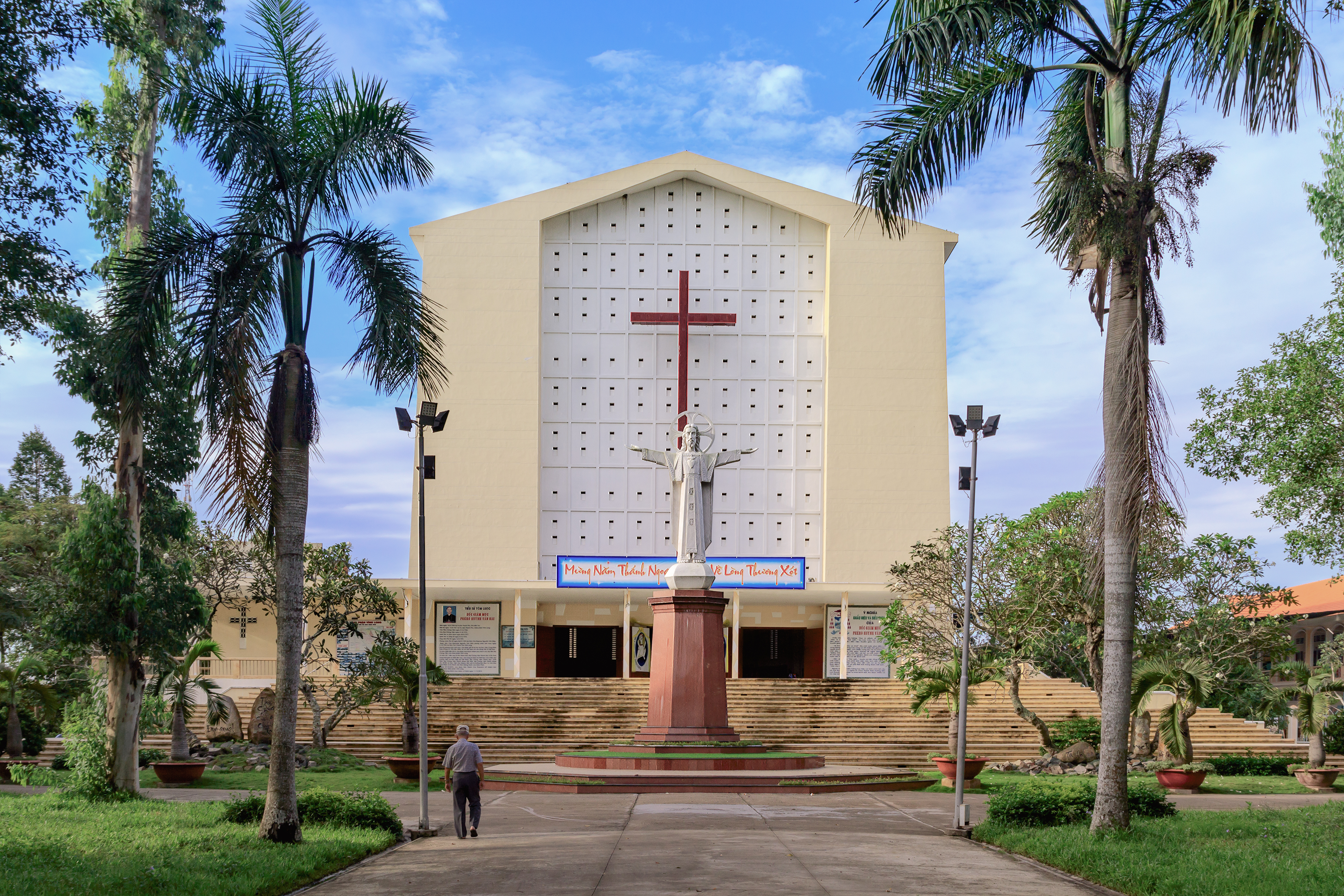
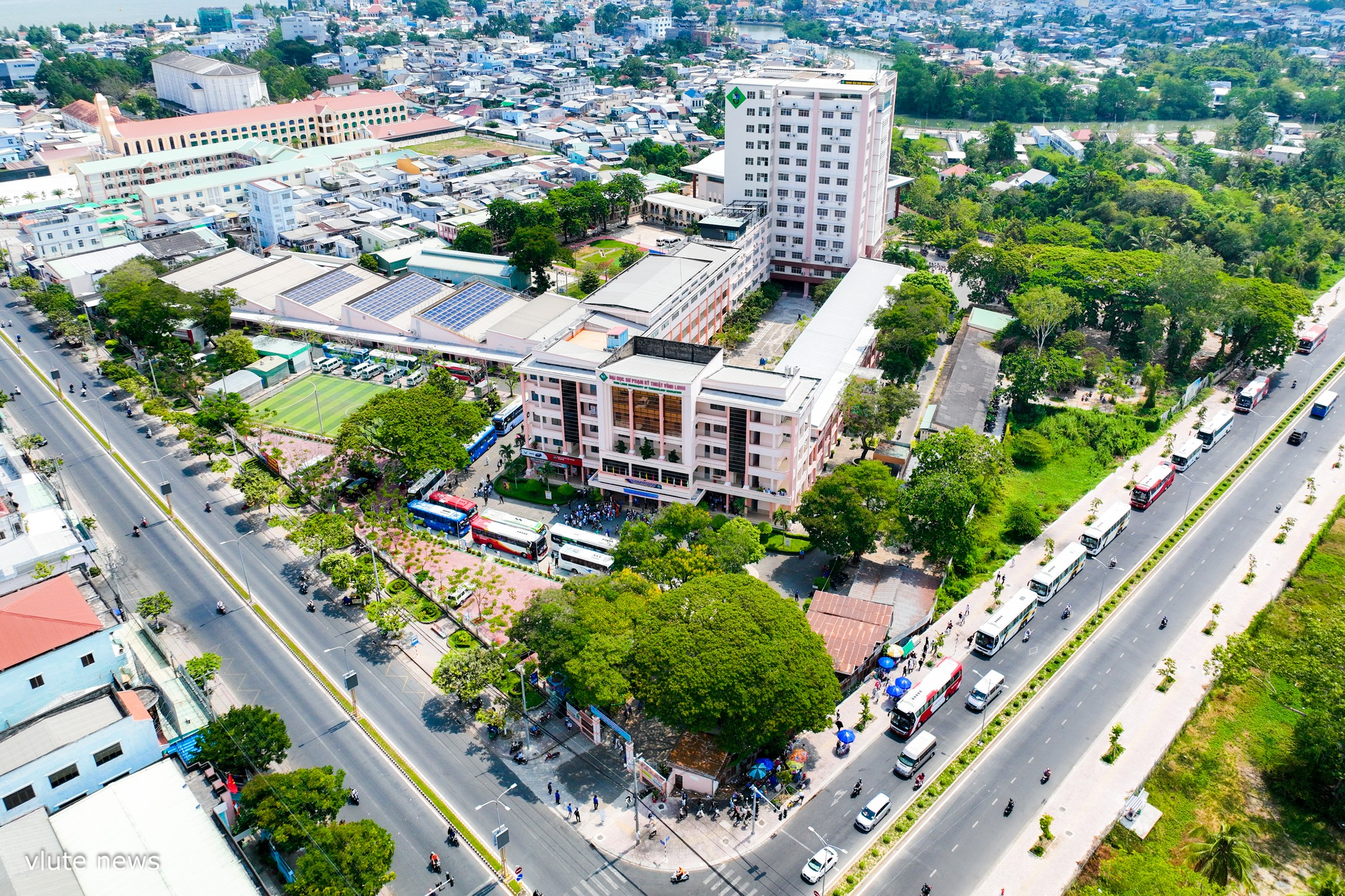
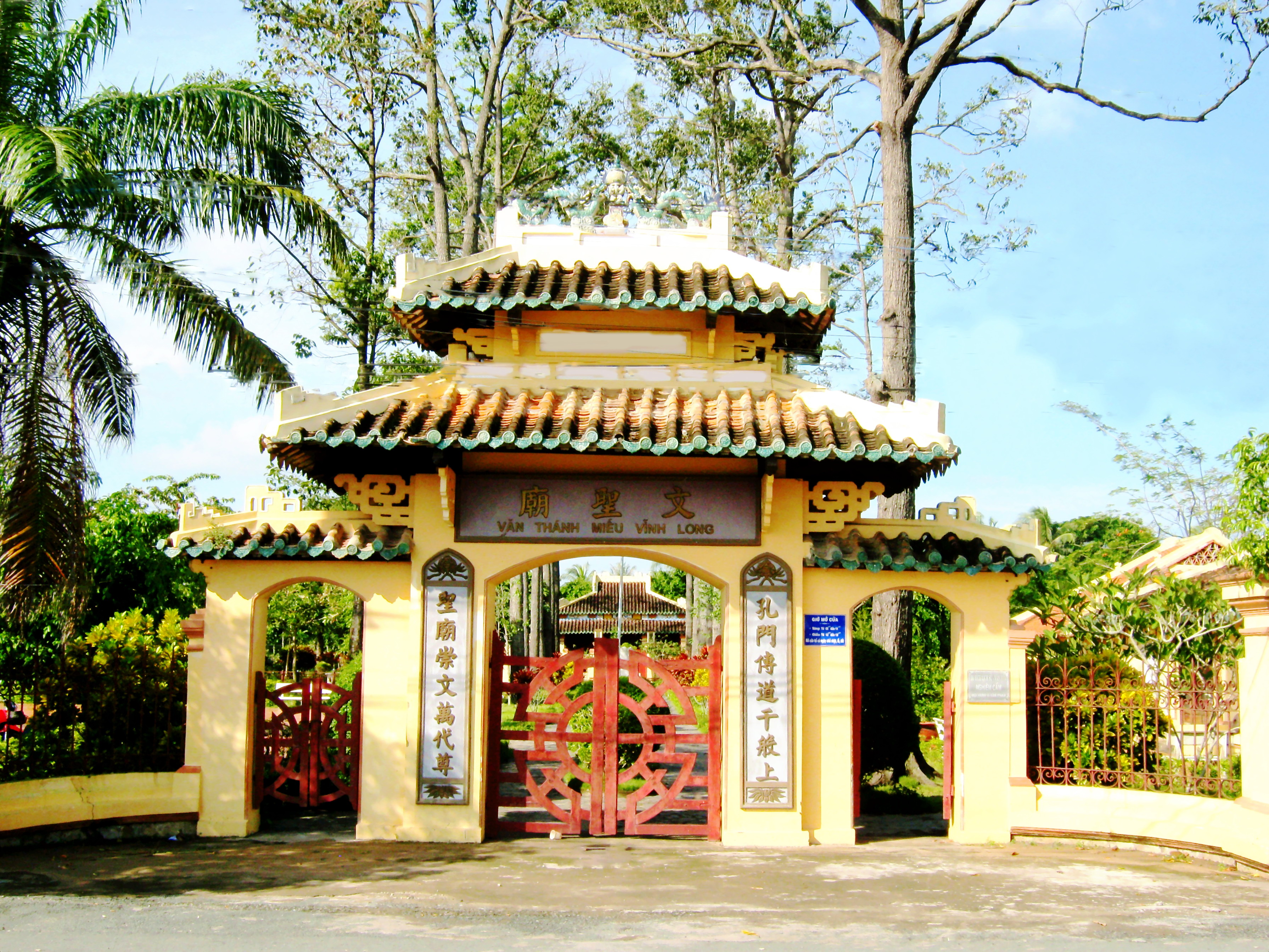
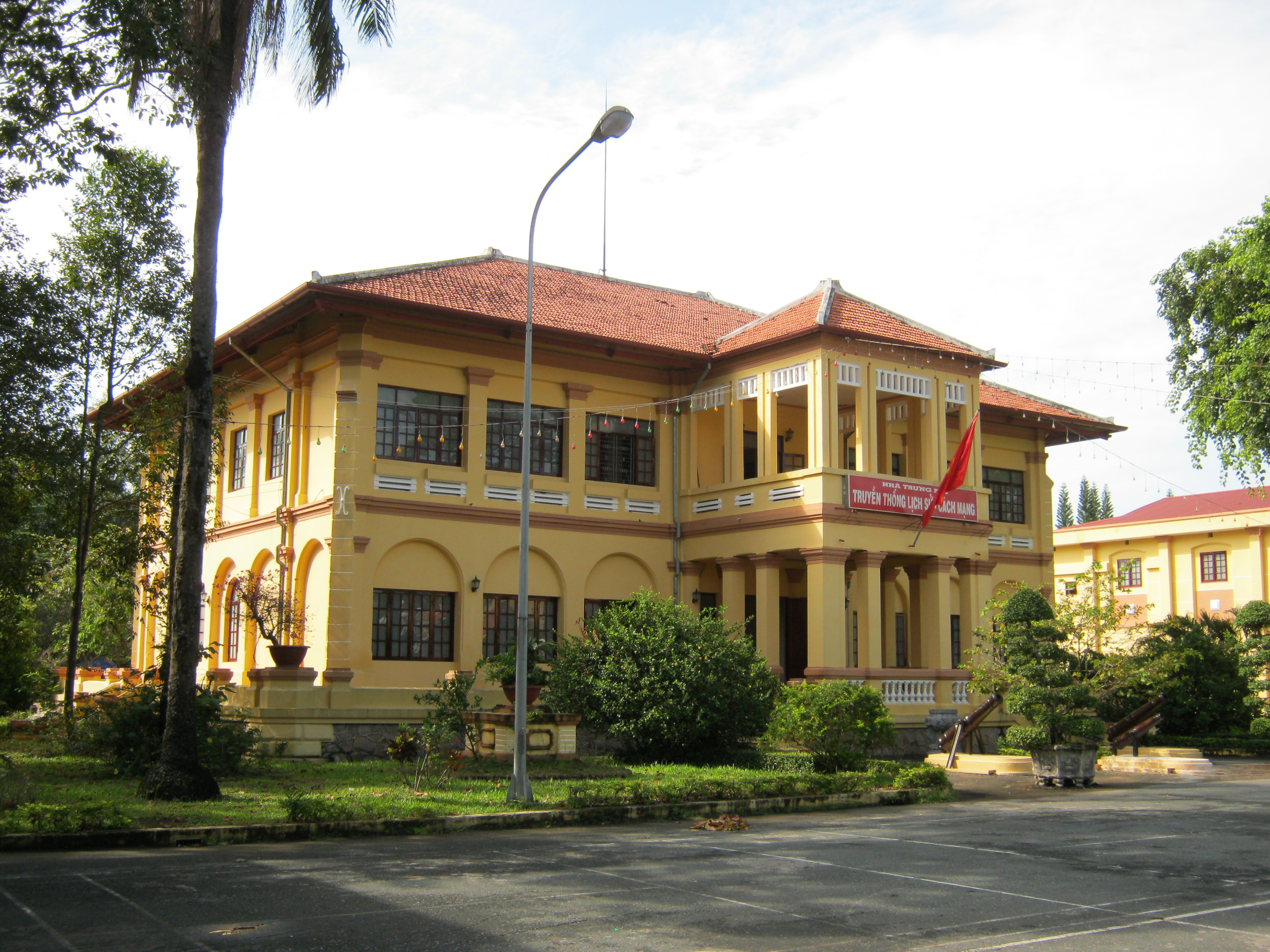
- Vĩnh Long provincial administrative centre Vĩnh Long Cathedral Church Vĩnh Long University of Technology Education Temple of Literature, Vĩnh Long Vĩnh Long Museum

- Seal
- Nickname: "The Sky of the Swirling Water" (Vùng trời nước xoáy)
- Motto: "Go to sea and let down nets" (Hãy ra khơi mà thả lưới)
- Interactive map of Vĩnh Long City; Thành phố Vĩnh Long
- Location of Vĩnh Long in Vietnam
- Coordinates: 10°15′N 105°58′E
- Country: Vietnam
- Province: Vĩnh Long Province

Area
  - Total: 48.1 km^{2} (18.6 sq mi)

Population (2018)
  - Total: 200,120
  - Density: 4,160/km^{2} (10,800/sq mi)

Vĩnh Long [jɨn˨˩˦:lawŋ˧˧] is a former city and the capital of Vĩnh Long Province in Vietnam's Mekong Delta.

== Geography ==
Vĩnh Long covers 48.1 square kilometres (18.6 sq mi) and has a population of 200,120 (as of 2018). The name was spelled 永隆 ("eternal prosperity") in the former Hán-Nôm writing system.

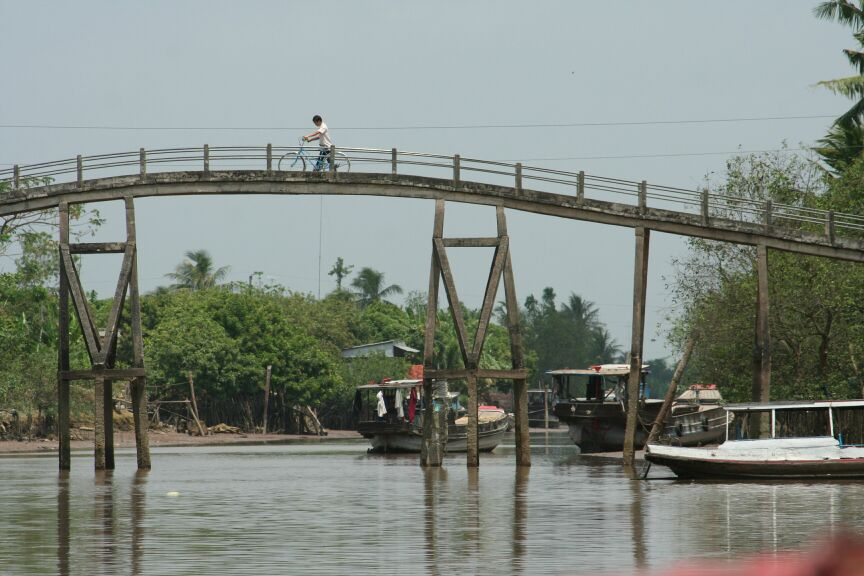
Narrow bridge over canal on the island of An Binh

=== Topography ===
Vĩnh Long is on the Cổ Chiên River, which branches out from the Mekong River at the narrows of Mỹ Thuận about 10 kilometres (6.2 mi) upstream, only to meet it later downstream. Across the Cổ Chiên river from Vĩnh Long are the An Binh and Bình Hòa Phước islands, some 15 kilometres (9.3 mi) across, with the Mekong River on the other side. A number of canals run through Vĩnh Long, with tall vehicular bridges crossing them. Transport by boat is possible, although parts of the town, particularly An Binh, become unreachable at low tide.

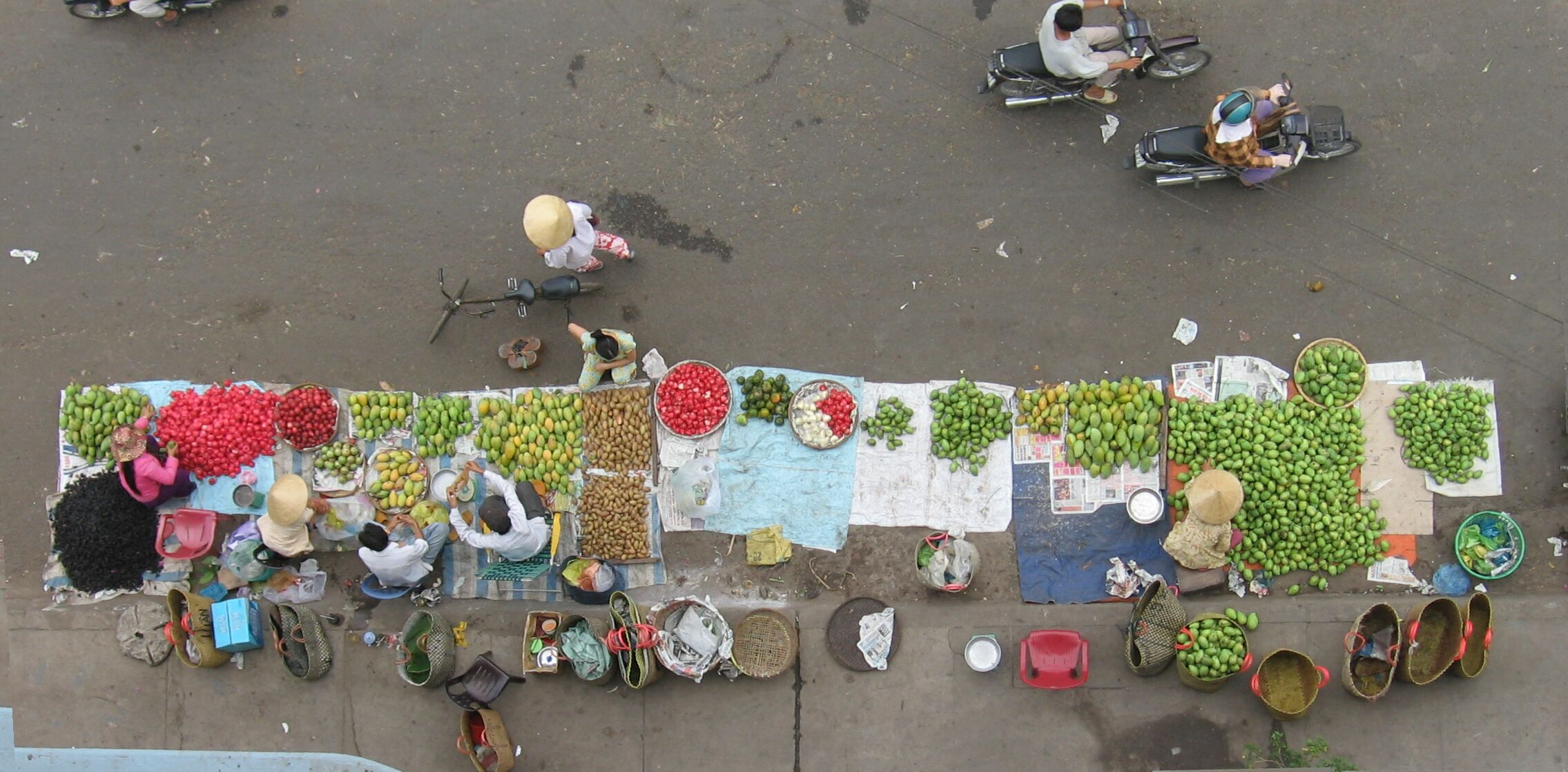
Fruit stalls along the street in Vĩnh Long market, selling ripe and green mangos, plums, and milk apples.

Vĩnh Long is about two hours from the large city of Cần Thơ in the adjacent Hậu Giang Province, and about three hours from Saigon. The floating market town of Cái Bè is on the other side of the An Binh island and is the frequent destination for tourists from Vĩnh Long.

== Population ==
Vinh Long City has an area of 47.82 km^{2}, population is 138,981 people, population density is 2,906 people/km^{2} on December 31, 2022.

== See also ==
- Vĩnh Long Airfield
