= Bianqing =

Ancient Chinese lithophone

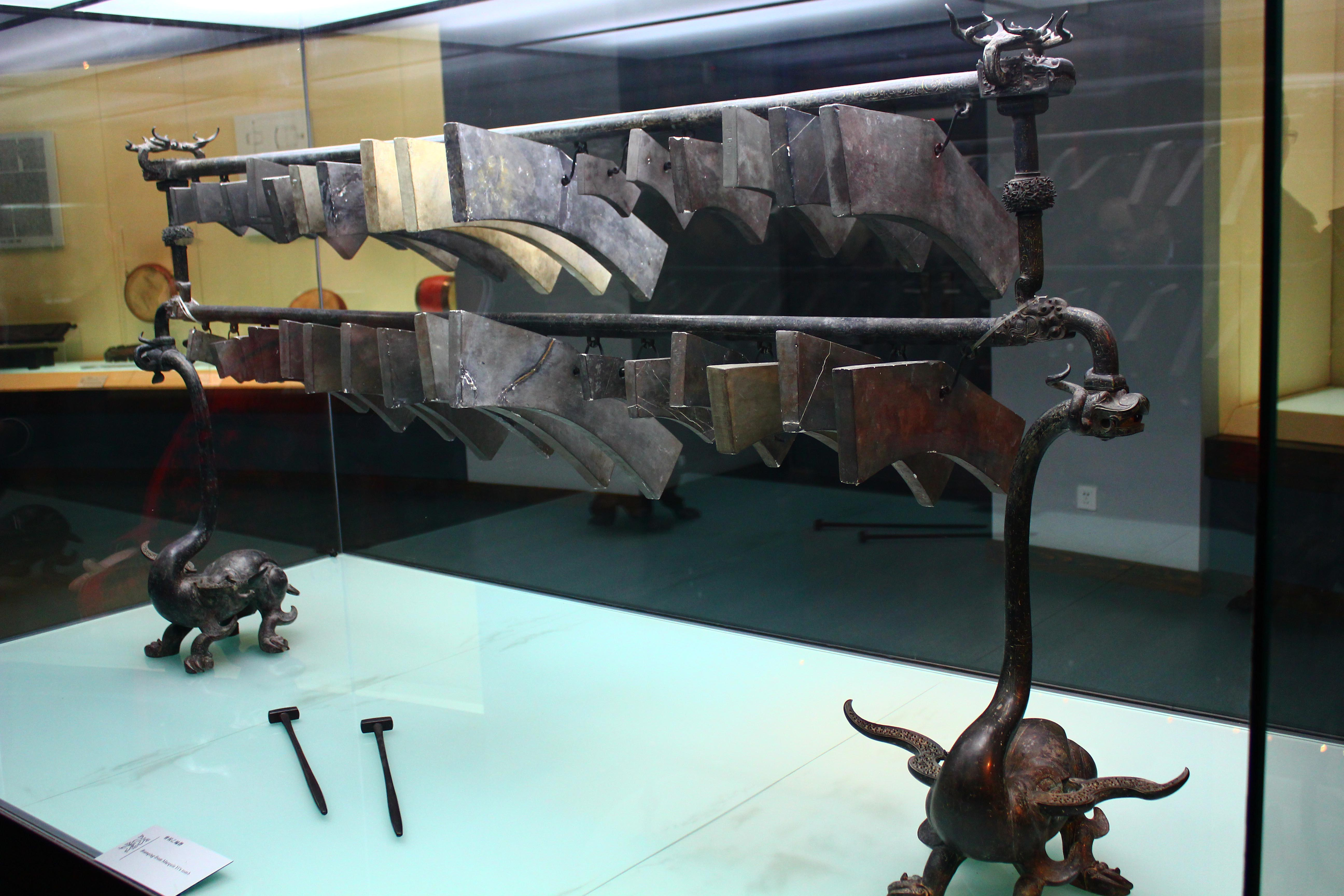
- Bianqing from the Tomb of Marquis Yi of Zeng
- Traditional Chinese: 編磬
- Simplified Chinese: 编磬
Transcriptions
Standard Mandarin
- Hanyu Pinyin: biānqìng
- Yale Romanization: byān-chìng

- Bianqing
- Hangul: 편경
- Hanja: 編磬
- RR: pyeongyeong
- MR: p'yŏn'gyŏng

The bianqing (/biːɛnˈtʃɪŋ/; Chinese: 编磬; pinyin: biānqìng; Mandarin pronunciation: [[bi̯ɛn˥ t͡ɕʰiŋ˥˩]]) is a traditional Chinese percussion instrument consisting of a set of L-shaped flat stone chimes known as qing, played melodically. The chimes were hung in a wooden frame and struck with a mallet. Along with the bronze bells called bianzhong, they were an important instrument in China's ritual and court music going back to ancient times.

The instrument was imported to Vietnam (where it is called biên khánh), and Korea (where it is called pyeongyeong). In the 11th year of King Yejong of Goryeo (1116), it was imported from the Song Dynasty. It is still used in Korean court and ritual music.

== History ==
The bianqing existed before Shang Dynasty. The bianqing in the Shang Dynasty are made of stone, jade and bronze. The tiger shaped stone bianqing unearthed from the Yin tomb in the village of Wu Guan in Anyang, Henan Province, is made of marble and has a history of more than 3000 years. Its timbre is as clear as that of bronze musical instruments.

During the spring and Autumn period, Confucius was an expert in making bianqing.

During the reign of the Qianlong Emperor of the Qing dynasty (1736-1795), the special bianqing (now collected in the temple of heaven in Beijing) were made of Xinjiang Hetian Jasper, with a zigzag shape. In 1790, the Qianlong Emperor also made a set of bianqing with gold, and a set of bianzhong was used with it.

Since the 1970s, China has successively unearthed large bianqing in Jiangling and Suixian counties of Hubei Province. Jiangnan ancient city of Jiangling, Hubei Province, is the capital of Chu state during the spring and Autumn period and Warring States period. A set of 25 chimes were unearthed here in 1970. A total of 41 chimes were unearthed from the tomb of Marquis Yi of Zeng in suixian County, Hubei Province.

In the second half of 1980, Hubei Provincial Museum cooperated with Wuhan Institute of physics to copy this set of bianqing from the early Warring States period more than 2400 years ago. Its pronunciation is consistent with the phonetic inscriptions of the original bianqing．The bass is thick and high, the treble is clear, the timbre is beautiful and beautiful, and the range is up to three octaves. It can rotate the palace and play a variety of music.

The bianqing has always played an important role in traditional Chinese music. In ancient times, it was used for large ceremonies and sacrifices. In modern times, it appears more and more in the performance in people's vision.

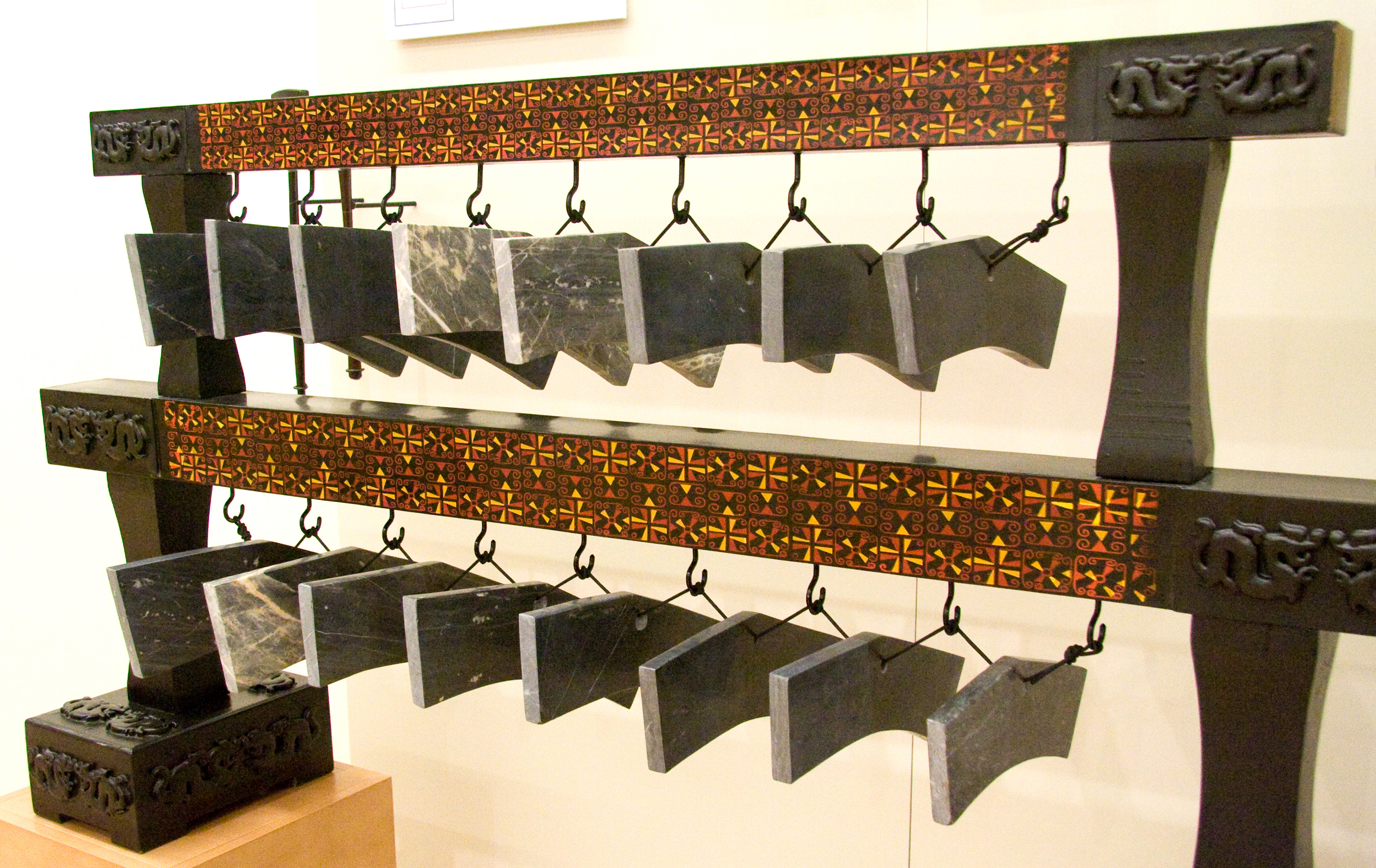
bianqing, Musical Instrument Museum, Phoenix, Arizona.

== See also ==
- Bianzhong
- Fangxiang
- Gong chime
- Traditional Chinese musical instruments
- Traditional Korean musical instruments
- Traditional Vietnamese musical instruments
