= Sounding stone =

Ancient Chinese musical instrument

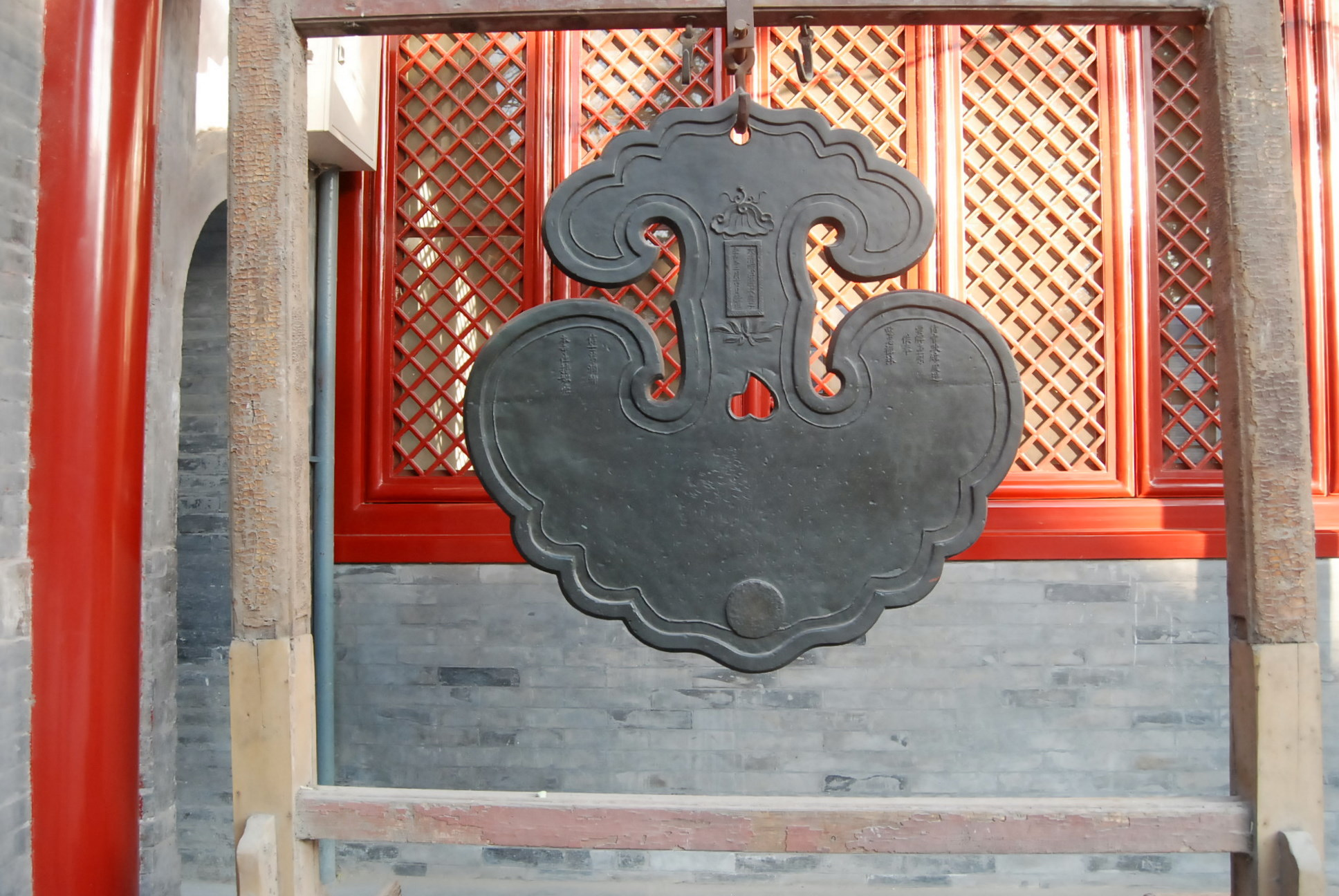
A yúnbǎn (云板) at Beijing's Fayuan Temple

A sounding stone or qing (Chinese: 磬; pinyin: qìng) is an ancient Chinese musical instrument, usually L-shaped. The set of qing is called bianqing. The shape of such stones was often quoted as description for the reverent ritual pose.

Important information on qing nomenclature is contained in the Erya dictionary: the large sounding stone was called xiāo 毊, and a solo performance on qing, jiǎn 寋. However, the mentioned names do not have much currency in the classical literature.

Qing is mentioned in the Analects as one of the instruments played by Confucius.

In the Han dynasty treatises on music, its sound is referred to as "reminding the monarch about his officers who died while protecting the borders".

== See also ==
- List of Chinese musical instruments
