= Hubei Provincial Museum =

Museum in Hubei, China

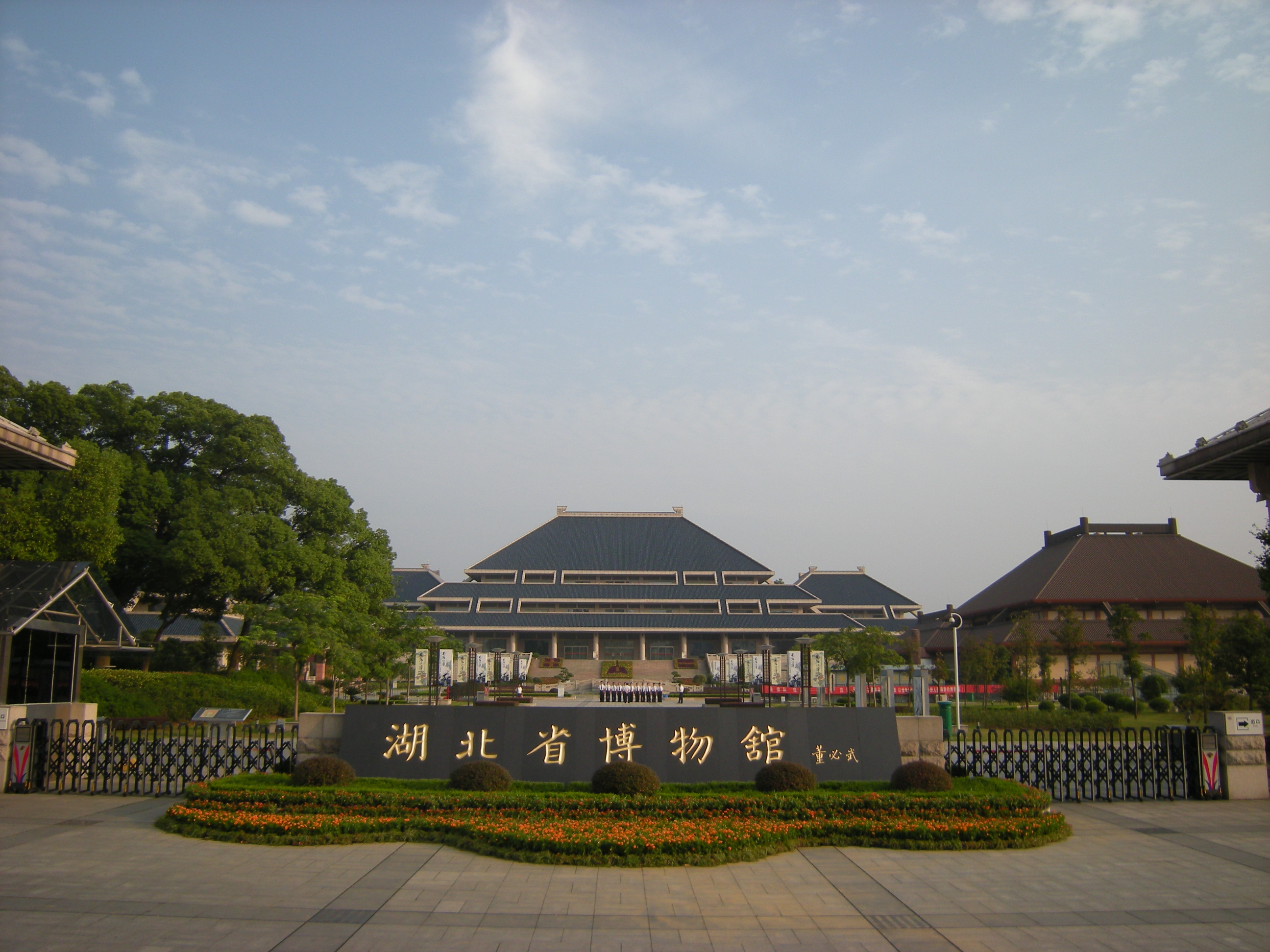
- Established: March 16, 1953
- Location: Wuchang, Wuhan, Hubei, China
- Coordinates: 30°33′50″N 114°21′32″E
- Type: History museum
- Curator: Zhang Xiaoyun
- Website: www.hbww.org.cn

The Hubei Provincial Museum (Chinese: 湖北省博物馆; pinyin: Húběi shěng bówùguǎn) is a first class museum in China, with a large amount of state-level historic and cultural relics. Established in 1953, the museum moved to its present location in 1960 and gained its present name in 1963. Since 1999 a number of new buildings have been added. The museum received 1,992,512 visitors in 2017.

The museum is located in the Wuchang District of Wuhan, Hubei Province, not far from the west shore of Wuhan's East Lake. It has a collection of over 460,000 objects, including the Sword of Goujian, an ancient set of bronze bells (Bianzhong), extensive artifacts from the Tomb of Marquis Yi of Zeng and the tombs at Baoshan, and portions of the Guodian Chu Slips. The particular importance of several of the archaeological items in the museum's collection has been recognized by the national government by including them into the list of Chinese cultural relics forbidden to be exhibited abroad.

== History ==
The predecessor of the Hubei Provincial Museum was the Hubei Provincial Public Scientific Experiment Hall established in 1928. In 1953, the Hubei Provincial Cultural Bureau began to prepare and it became the Hubei Provincial Institute of Cultural History Research. In 1959, the Hubei Provincial Museum Preparation Office was built in the Donghu Scenic Area of Wuhan. In 1960, the renowned writer and patriot Dong Biwu inscribed the name of the Hubei Provincial Museum. In 2002, Hubei Provincial Museum and the Hubei Provincial Institute of Cultural Archaeology merged for office operations. In 2023, the Hubei Provincial Museum and Hubei Provincial Institute of Cultural Archaeology separated and operated independently. In 2023, the Hubei Provincial Cultural Exchange Information Center and the Provincial Institute of Art and Craft were integrated into the Hubei Provincial Museum. In the same year, Hubei Provincial Museum and the institute operated independently respectively.

== Location and layout ==
The Hubei Provincial Museum is located in Donghu Scenic Area of Wuhan City, Hubei Province, China. The total construction area is 125,000 square meters, and the exhibition area is 38,000 square meters. It forms an overall layout of "four museums, three centers, and two bases". The overall layout of the museum area reflects the symmetrical central axis of Chu Dynasty architecture, "one platform and one hall", "multiple platforms in groups", and "multiple groups in clusters" of high platform architectural layout format. In 2021, a new building was built on the south side of the original building complex (the old building). The new building has 5 floors (4 floors above ground and 1 floor underground). It has 12 thematic exhibition halls, 1 digital exhibition hall, 3 temporary exhibition halls, and a chime bell performance hall. The exterior of the old building is in the shape of a ladder, while the exterior of the new building is in the shape of an inverted ladder. The top wall of the new building is made of glass, which allows visitors to view the scenery of Donghu through the glass wall. The interior design of the new building highlights the cultural elements.

== Exhibition layout ==
=== Permanent exhibition ===
The museum's permanent exhibitions include Marquis Yi of Zeng, the Special Exhibition of the Sword of Goujian, The Zeng Family - Unveiling the Secrets of the State of Zeng, Eight Hundred Years of Chu, Liangzhuangwang Collection - Treasures from the Zhenghe Era, and Heaven Sounds - Early Musical Instruments Found in Hubei. The museum lists Eight Hundred Years of Chu (楚国八百年), on the third floor of the South Hall, among its permanent exhibitions. Reporting on the gallery by the Hubei Provincial Department of Culture and Tourism has documented Guodian bamboo manuscripts there, including Taiyi Shengshui.

=== Temporary exhibitions ===
Temporary displays feature Chinese cultural relics from different themes and periods, such as "Temporary Exhibition of Treasures from the Uffizi Gallery in Italy".

=== Virtual exhibitions ===
Also known as "Cloud Viewing of Exhibits". People can access the Hubei Provincial Museum via electronic devices to view and appreciate the exhibits.

== Important collection of items ==
The Hubei Provincial Museum currently houses over 460,000 items (sets), among which 1,095 are first-class cultural relics. The museum's collection includes bronze ware, lacquer and woodware, gold and silverware, jade, ceramics, calligraphy and paintings, etc. These relics mainly come from archaeological excavations (such as the Panlongcheng Shang Dynasty site and the Shashihe Site in Tianmen) and private donations. The unearthed cultural relics from archaeological excavations reflect the ancient art of the Hubei region and have a strong "Jingchu Civilization" flavor.

=== The Sword of Goujian ===
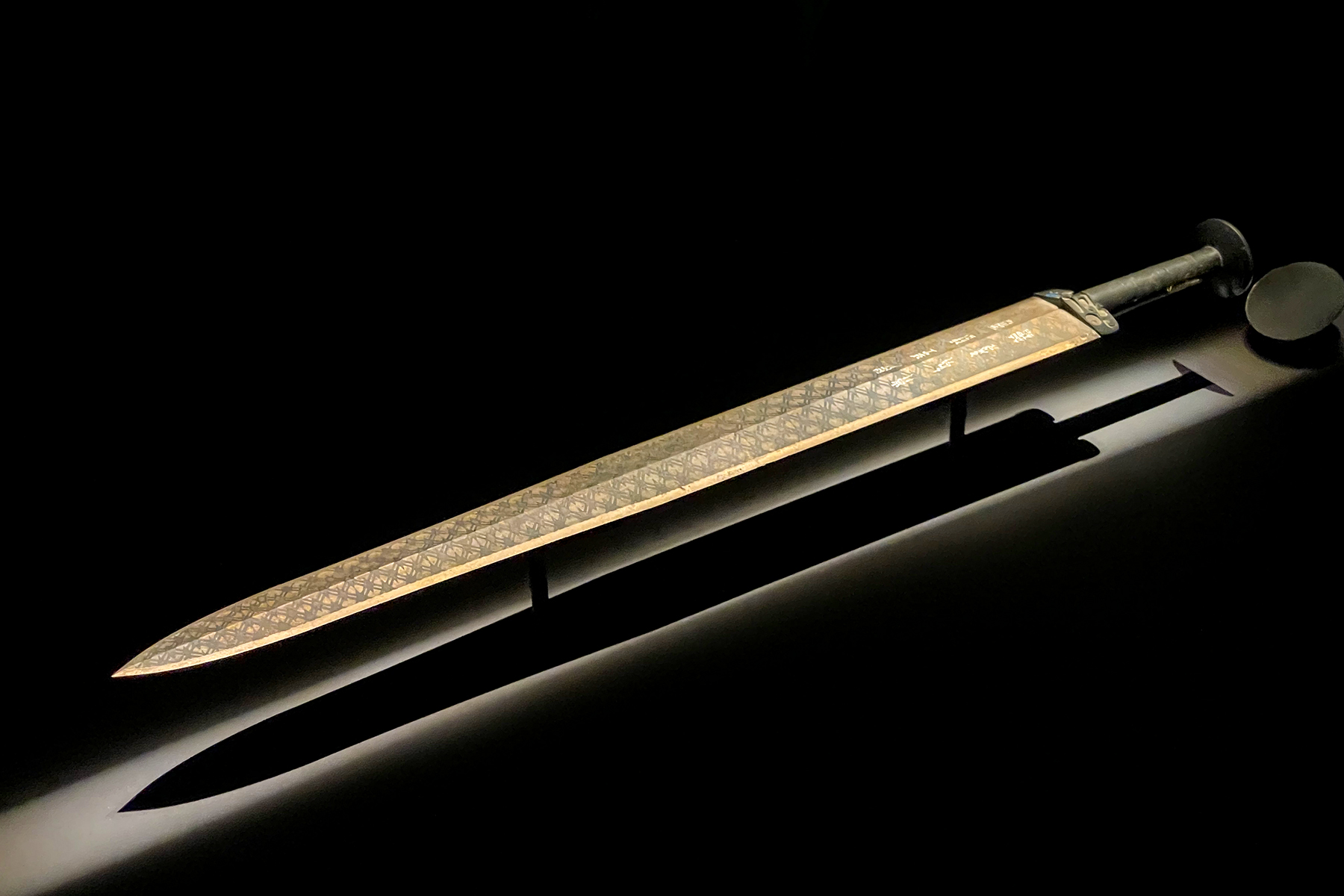
The Sword of Goujian

It is hailed as "the best sword in the world". This artifact was unearthed in December 1965 from Tomb No. 1 at Wangshan, Jiangling, Hubei Province. The sword is 55.6 centimeters long and 5 centimeters wide. This sword has not rusted for over 2,000 years and the patterns are clearly visible. There are two lines of bird-tail script inscriptions on the blade, which read "King Goujian of Yue, I use this sword for myself". After experts' research, Goujian is identified as King Goujian. This sword was the main short weapon during the Spring and Autumn period and Warring States periods.

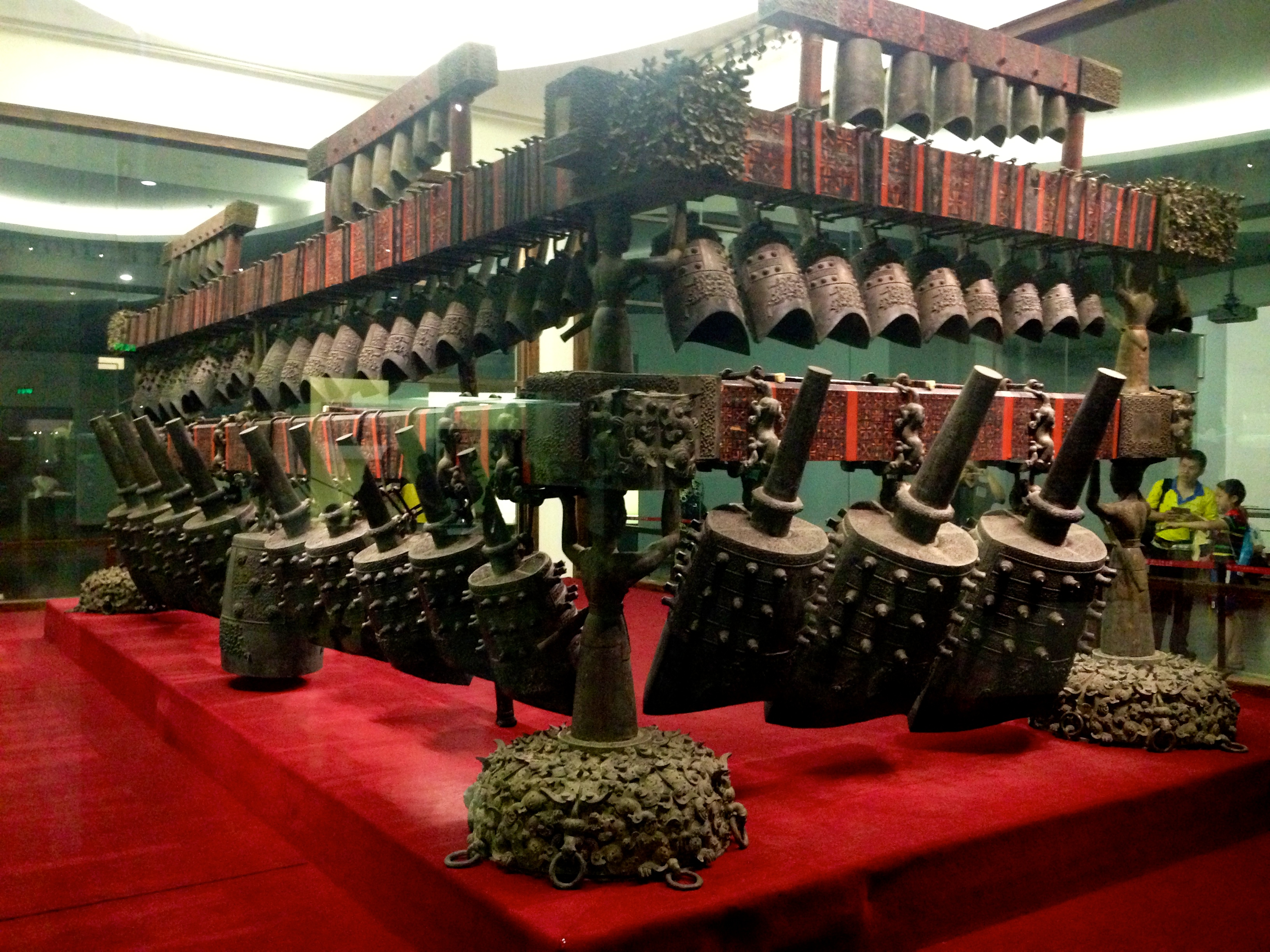
Bian Zhong of Marquis Yi of Zeng

=== Bianzhong of Marquis Yi of Zeng ===
The Bianzhong of Marquis Yi of Zeng was discovered in Suixian County, Hubei Province, in 1978, unearthed from the tomb of Marquis Yi of Zeng. They were musical instruments used in the courts of the pre-Qin period. The bell stand is 7.48 meters long and 2.65 meters high. The complete set of bells consists of 54 pieces. It is the largest and best-preserved set of bells discovered in China to date. It represents the highest achievements of China's pre-Qin ritual and music civilization and bronze casting technology.

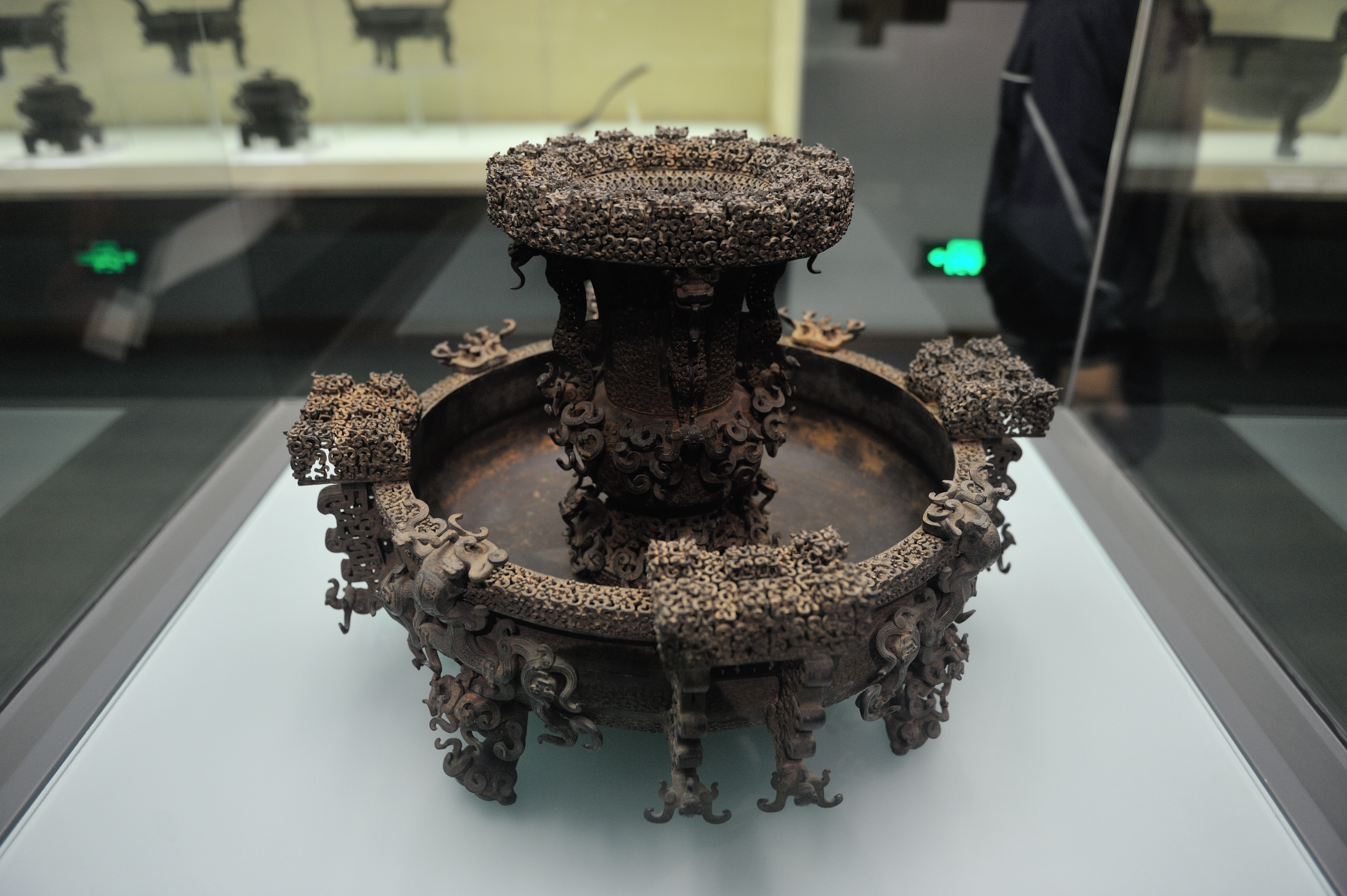
Bronze Vase and Plate of Marquis Yi of Zeng

=== Bronze Vase and Plate of Marquis Yi of Zeng ===
It is discovered in 1978 at the Marquis Yi of Zeng tomb in Suizhou City, Hubei Province. It is one of the representatives of Chinese bronze craftsmanship and also the pinnacle of bronze wares from the Shang and Zhou dynasties. It consists of a vase and a plate. The vase is 30.1 centimeters tall and 25 centimeters in diameter, while the plate is 23.5 centimeters tall and 58 centimeters in diameter. Its shape and patterns are extremely complex and exquisite.

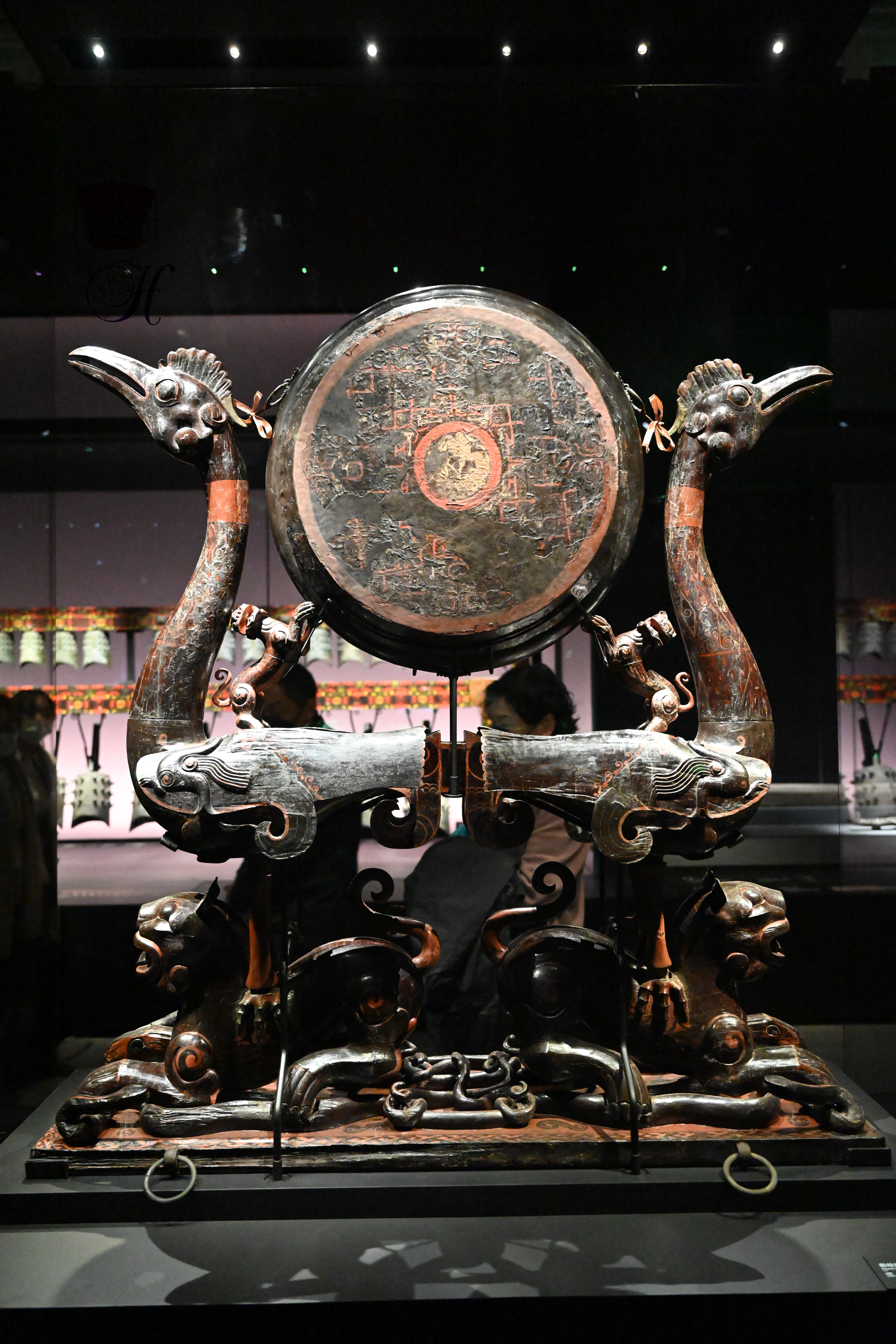
The Tiger-Seat Bird-Shaped Drum

=== The Tiger-Seat Bird-Shaped Drum ===
It is also known as the Tiger-Seat Phoenix-Shaped Drum. It was unearthed in Tomb No. 2 of Jiulandun in Hubei Province in 2002. It belongs to the middle to late Warring States period. The Tiger-Seat Bird-Shaped Drum is 135.9 centimeters tall and 134 centimeters wide. It is made of wood and comes in colors such as black, red, yellow and silver-white. The Tiger-Seat Bird-Shaped Drum is an instrument of the noble class in the Chu Kingdom. Its design features a phoenix and a tiger. The phoenix is the totem of the Chu people. This artifact showcases the romance of Chu culture.

=== Blue and White plum vase of the four loves in Yuan Dynasty ===
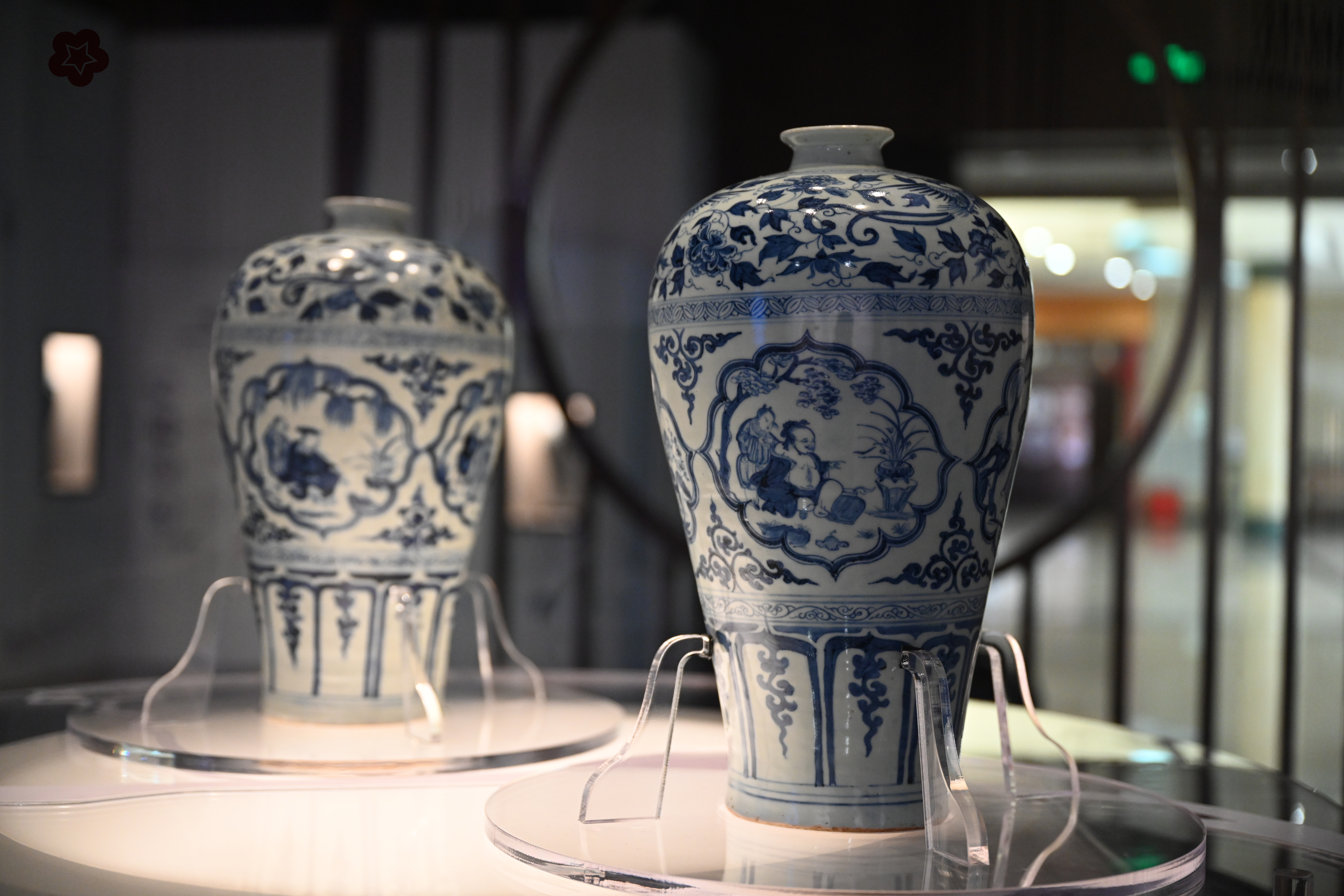
Blue and White plum vase of the four loves in the Yuan Dynasty

It was unearthed in 2006 from the Yingjing King's tomb in Zhongxiang, Hubei Province. The overall height is 38.7 centimeters, the diameter at the mouth is 6.4 centimeters, and the diameter at the bottom is 13 centimeters. It belongs to the "Yuan" Dynasty and is hailed as "the panda of ceramics". The vase features four pictures of stories about people - "Four Adventures Picture". "The Four Adventures Picture" includes "Wang Xizhi's Love for Orchids Picture", "Zhou Dunyi's Love for Lotus Picture", "Tao Yuanming's Love for Chrysanthemums Picture", and "Lin Hengjing's Love for Plum Blossoms and Cranes Picture". It symbolizes beauty, purity, and elegance, and at the same time reflects people's yearning for rural life and seclusion at that time.

=== Guodian Chu Slips ===
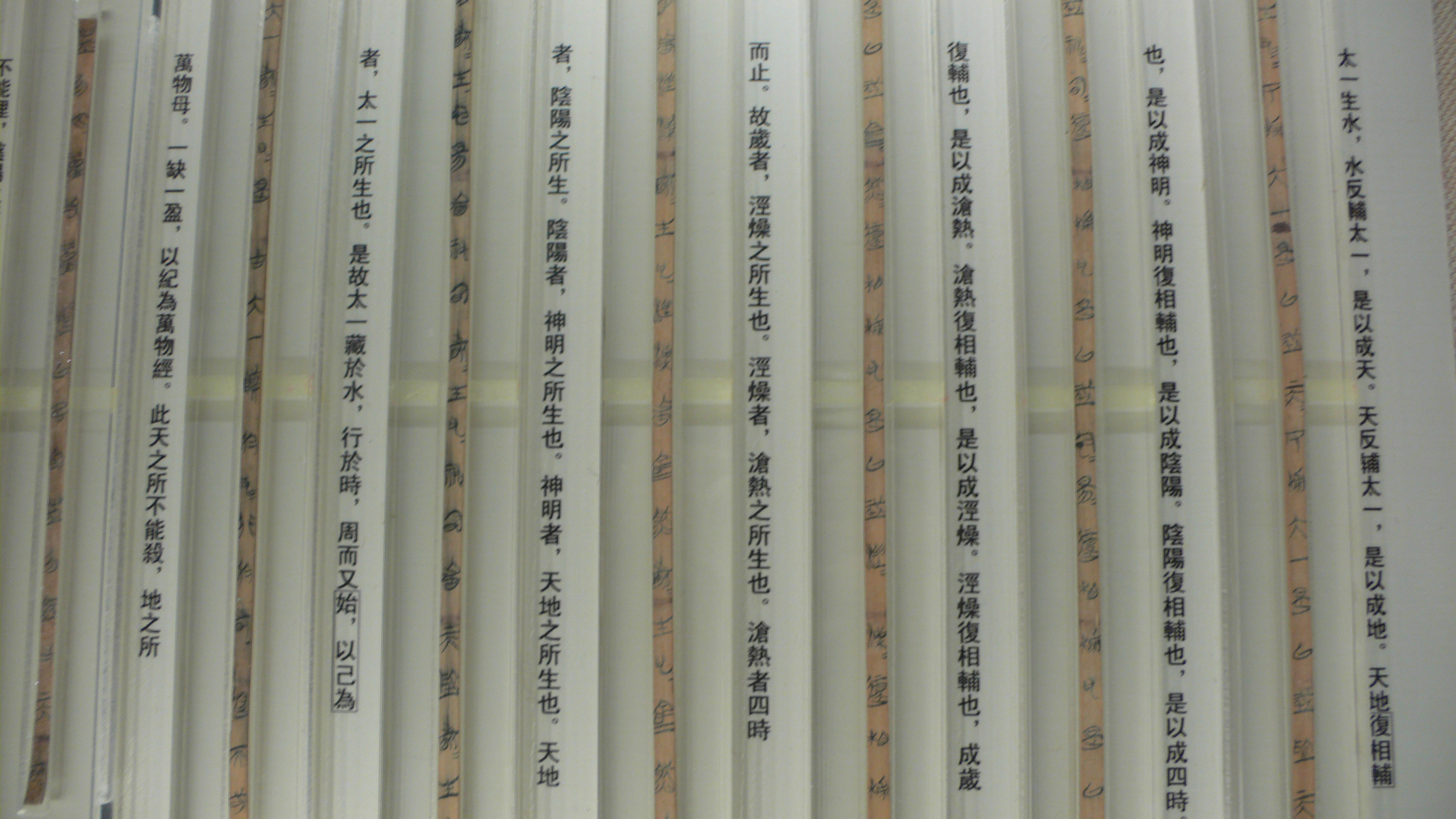
Part of the Guodian text Taiyi Shengshui, photographed at the Hubei Provincial Museum

The Guodian Chu Slips are a group of Warring States period bamboo manuscripts excavated in 1993 from Tomb No. 1 at Guodian, near Jingmen, Hubei. The tomb yielded about 800 bamboo slips, of which about 730 were inscribed, containing more than 13,000 Chinese characters; it is generally dated to around 300 BCE. The corpus contains manuscripts associated in later scholarship with both Confucian and Daoist intellectual traditions; Kenneth W. Holloway has cautioned that imposing the later Han-period division between "Confucian" and "Daoist" schools on the Guodian material can obscure its earlier intellectual context.

The Hubei Provincial Museum's online collection catalogue includes three Guodian manuscript groups: Ziyi, Taiyi Shengshui, and the B group of the Laozi. Taiyi Shengshui and other Guodian material have been displayed in the museum's permanent Eight Hundred Years of Chu exhibition.

The Guodian Laozi manuscripts are important to the textual history of the Laozi (Daodejing) and to the study of early Daoist thought. They predate the Mawangdui Laozi manuscripts and are the oldest extant manuscript witnesses to the Laozi known to scholarship. About 2,000 characters on the Guodian slips correspond to material in the later received text, but the manuscripts differ in sequence and wording and have contributed to scholarly debate about how the Laozi was compiled and transmitted. The Laozi later became central to both philosophical and religious Daoism.

Taiyi Shengshui is also important for the study of early Chinese cosmology. The museum describes it as the first discovered pre-Qin document concerning the generation of the cosmos. Scholar Erica Brindley describes it as one of the relatively few early Chinese texts to present a detailed cosmogony, beginning with Taiyi ("the Great One") and water, while noting that the precise relationship of this material to what was later classified as Daoist thought remains uncertain.

=== Yunmeng Shuihudi Qin Bamboo Slips ===
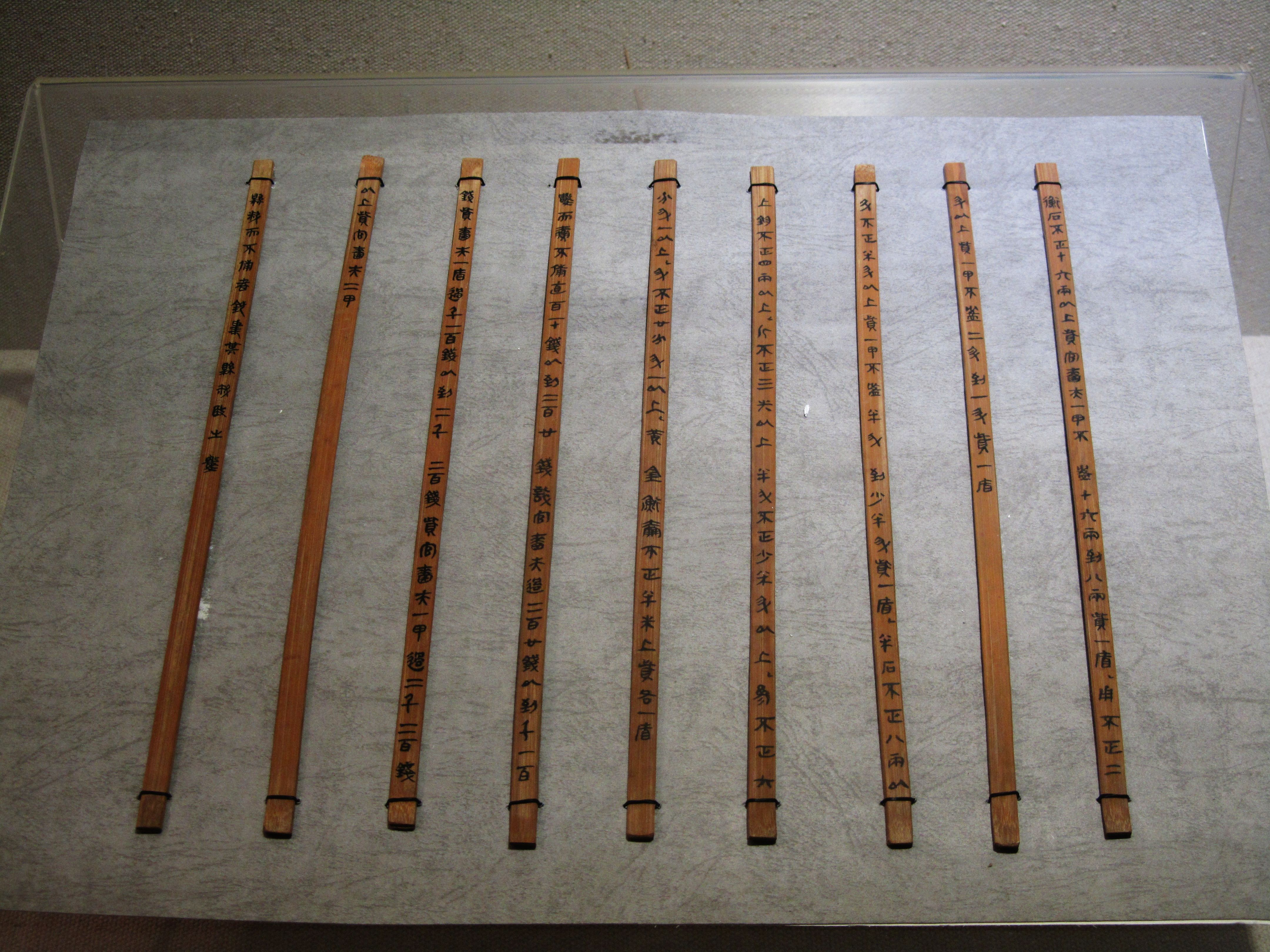
Yunmeng Shuihudi Qin Bamboo Slips

It was unearthed in Yunmeng County, Hubei Province in 1975. It is the first batch of large-scale Qin bamboo inscriptions discovered in Chinese archaeology, documenting the laws of the Qin Dynasty. Its contents cover agriculture, warehouses, currency, trade, labor, appointment of officials, etc. It is of great significance for studying the war history of Qin's unification of the six states, the official system, agricultural production, and the development of industry and commerce. It is presented in a hierarchical format and is also a first-hand source of information for studying hierarchies.

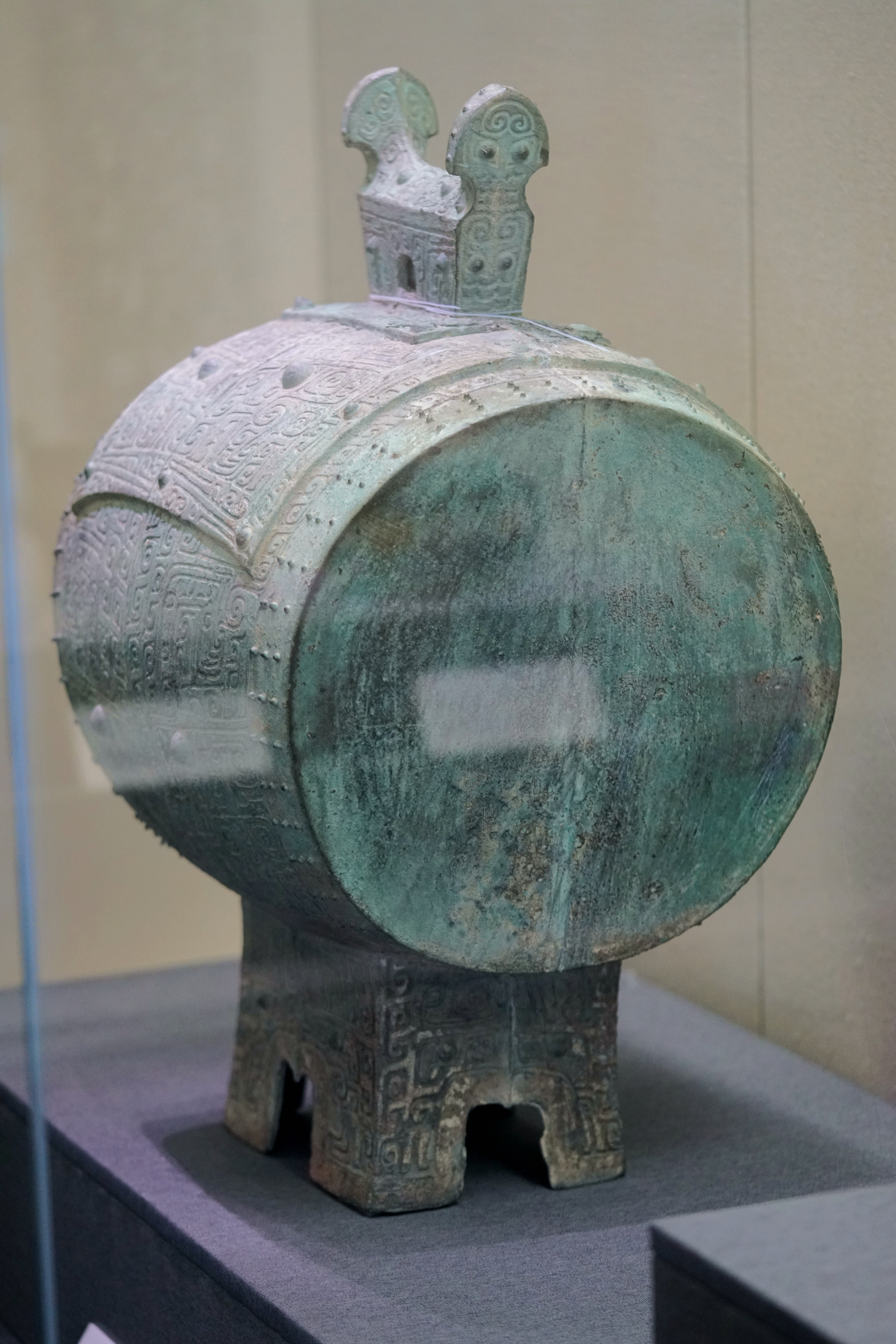
Chongyang Bronze Drum

=== Chongyang Bronze Drum ===
It was discovered in Chongyang County, Hubei Province in 1977. It is currently the earliest bronze drum of the Shang Dynasty in China. The drum is 75.5 centimeters in height and consists of three parts: the drum body, the drum base, and the drum cap. The drum cap, drum body, and drum base all feature lotus dot patterns and cloud and thunder patterns. When the drum surface is struck, it produces a sound, demonstrating the mighty spirit of the Shang Dynasty during rituals or warfare. This object provides materials for the study of ancient Chinese bronze wares and the ritual and music system.

=== Yunxian Man Cranium II ===
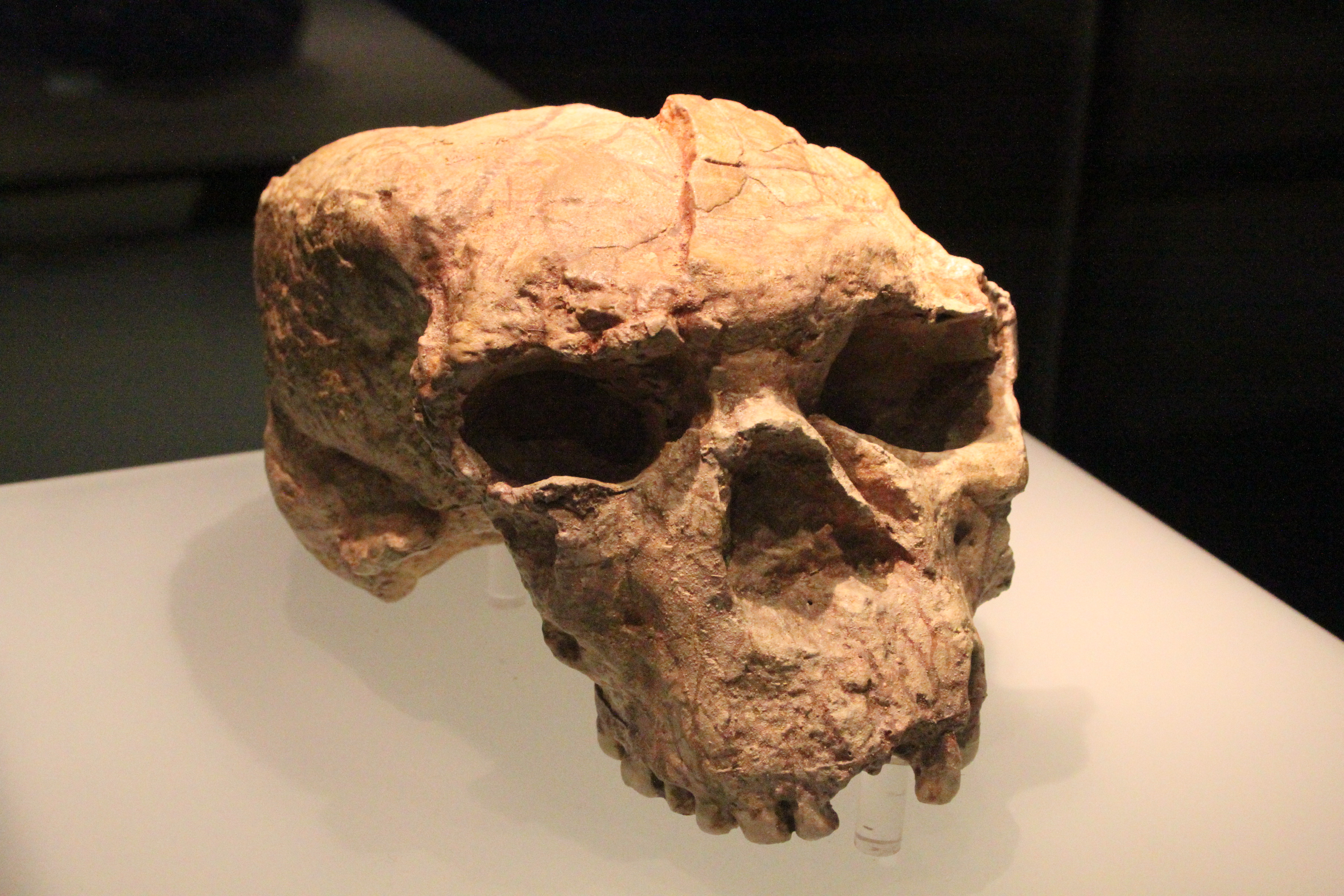
Yunxian Man Cranium II

In 1989 and 1990, two skull fossils were discovered successively in Yunxian, Hubei Province. Skull No. 1 is of a female and is aged between 25 and 45 years old, dating back approximately 1 million years; Skull No. 2 is of a male and is also aged between 25 and 45 years old, dating back approximately 1 million years. Skull No. 1 and Skull No. 2 have preserved complete cranial regions and largely intact facial regions. They belong to the Homo erectus type. Through research, it can be seen that the people of Yunxian were capable of making and using tools. The human skull fossils from Yunxian provide important data for the study of human development history.

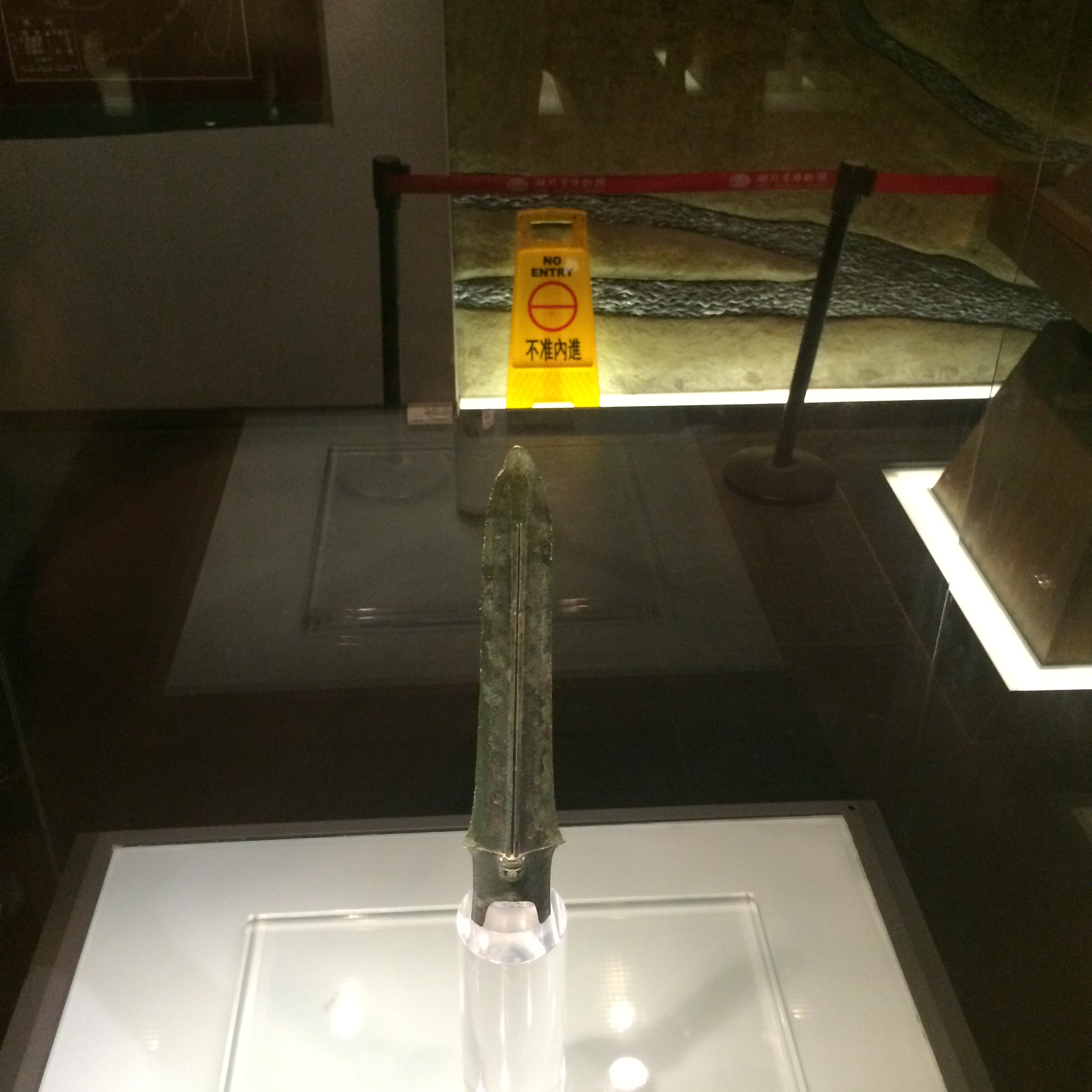
The spear of King Fuchai of Wu

=== The spear of King Fuchai of Wu ===
It was discovered in 1983 in Tomb No. 5 of Mashan in Jiangling, Hubei Province. It is 29.5 centimeters long and about 3 centimeters wide. On the blade, there is an 8-character inscription: "King Fuchai of Wu, made for personal use". This means it was a personal weapon of King Fuchai of Wu. It was made of bronze and its spear shaft was similar to that of a sword but shorter. The spearhead was sharp and intact as new. The center line had a ridge, and there were blood grooves on both sides of the ridge. At the end of each blood groove, there was a carved animal head. It is regarded as one of the "two wonders" of ancient Chinese weapons along with The Sword of Goujian.

=== Horned Stork ===
Horned Stork

It was produced during the Warring States period. It was unearthed in 1978 from the Marquis Yi of Zeng tomb in Suizhou City, Hubei Province. The total height is 143.5 centimeters and the weight is 38.4 kilograms. The stork is 110 centimeters tall, the seat board is 45 centimeters long and 41.4 centimeters wide. It is composed of eight components: a crane body, crane legs, deer antlers, and a base with mortise joints. The crane has a long neck, a round head, and an upturned pointed beak resembling a hook. There is a seven-character inscription on the right side of the beak: "Marquis Yi of Zeng made and used for life." It is a bronze artifact with exquisite details and outstanding overall craftsmanship.

== Administration & Organization ==
Director and Secretary of Party Branch: Zhang Xiaoyun

Vice Directors: He Guang and Li Qi

The museum currently participates or leads the following organizations:

- China Museum Association Instrument Committee
- China-Italy Museum Alliance
- Hubei Provincial Museum Association
- Hubei Province Arts and Crafts Society

== Educational activities in the museum ==
- Academy of Music and Rituals
- The Lecture Hall of the Yangtze River Civilization
- Little Archaeologist
- Jingchu Red Lecture Hall
- Volunteer

== Cultural activities in the museum ==
- China Museum Association Instrument Professional Committee
- The representative of Hubei Provincial Museum attended the first Symposium on Musical Archaeological Remains and the 11th National Symposium on Musical Instruments Studies
- The International Council of Museums Committee for Musical Instruments "Theory, Technology and Method: Museums' Interpretation of Traditional Music" academic symposium was held at the Hubei Provincial Museum.
- The Hubei Provincial Museum, in collaboration with the Shaogan City Museum and the Yunmeng County Museum, has organized the "Practical Training Course on Minimal Intervention Conservation and Restoration of Ceramic Cultural Relics"
- Hubei Provincial Museum has launched the country's first film-level digital cultural relics VR experience project titled "Crossing the Bronze Age"
- The Hubei Provincial Museum has been holding an exhibition of the largest collection of Western oil paintings in the province for the past five years. The exhibition is titled "Flowing Palette: From Corot to Impressionism"
- Russia collaborated with the Saint Petersburg Symphony Orchestra and the Chime Orchestra of the Hubei Provincial Museum to jointly hold a music exchange event
- The research results of "Three-Dimensional Digital Restoration of Zeng Hou Yi's Vase and Plate" were released at the Hubei Provincial Museum
- The Cultural Products Committee of the Hubei Provincial Museum Association held a working symposium at the Hubei Provincial Museum.

== Publish books ==
- 《Eight Hundred Years of Chu State》
- 《Wang Bao's Collection of Essays》
- 《Marquis Yi of Zeng》
- 《The Zeng Family - Archaeological Revelation of the State of Zeng》
- 《Liang Zhuang King's Collection - Treasures from the Zheng He Era》
- 《Thousand-Year Cultural Heritage - The Archaeological Exhibition of the Yangtze River Civilization · Hubei》
- 《Ukiyo-e: 36 Views of Mount Fuji; 53 Stations of the Tokaido Rout》
- 《Journal of Classical Literature Studies: Yingzhou's Essays 》
- 《Research on the Archaeological Culture of the Deng State in the Zhou Dynasty》
- 《The First National Survey Results and Discoveries of Movable Cultural Relics of Hubei Provincial Museum》
- 《Xu Xing could easily handle ancient paintings, calligraphy, inscriptions and calligraphy scrolls》
- 《Hubei Provincial Museum and Archaeological Institute 202》
- 《National Museum General Knowledge Series · One Museum: Hubei Provincial Museum》

== Gallery ==
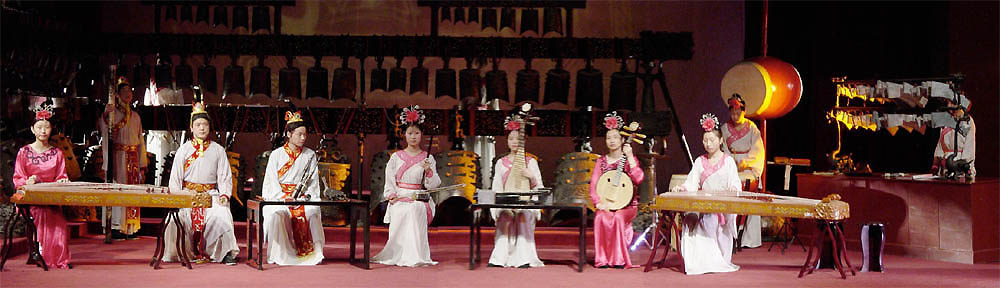
Replica instruments of ancient originals are played at the Hubei Provincial Museum. A replica set of bronze concert bells is in the background and a set of stone chimes is to the right
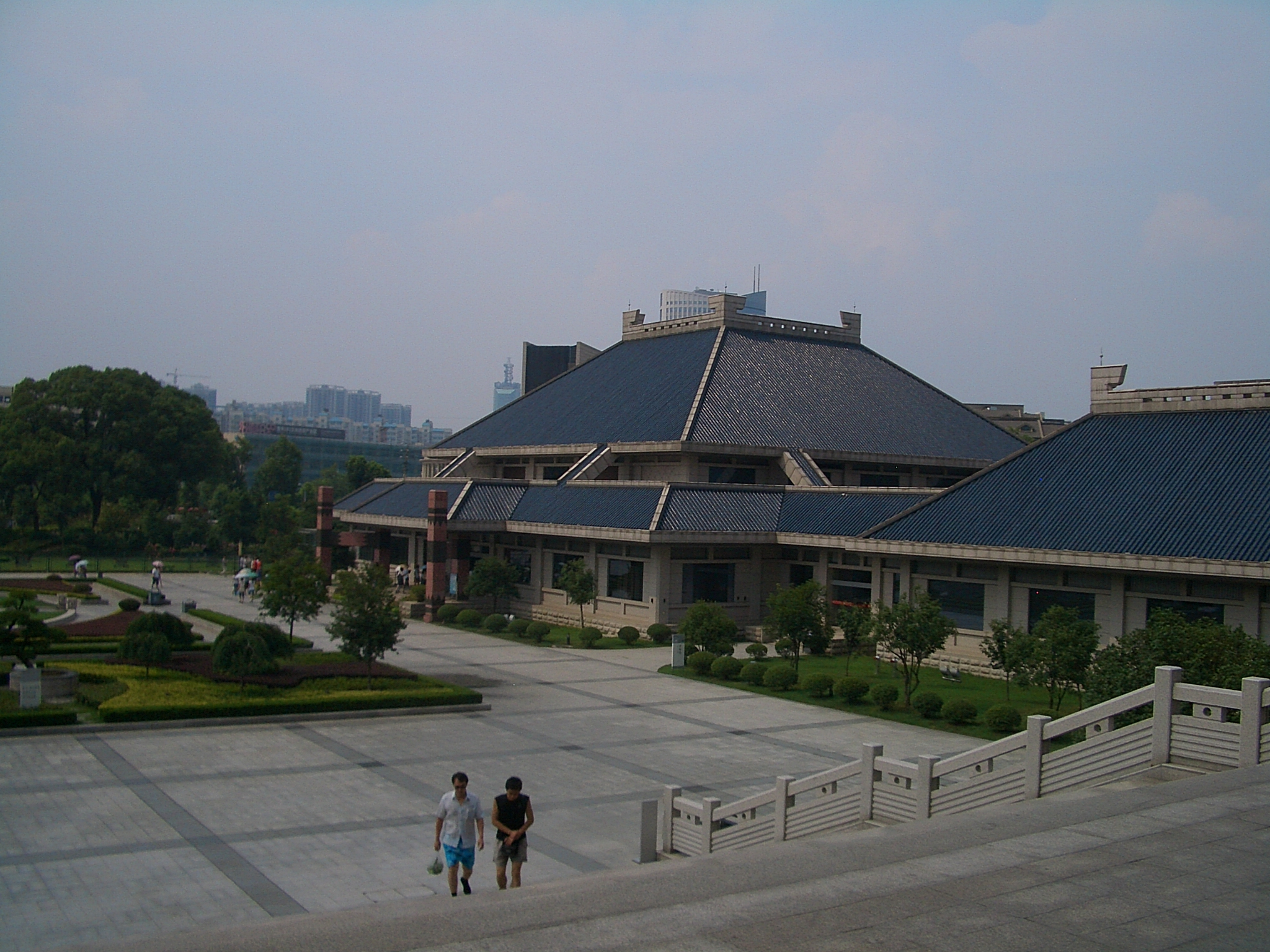

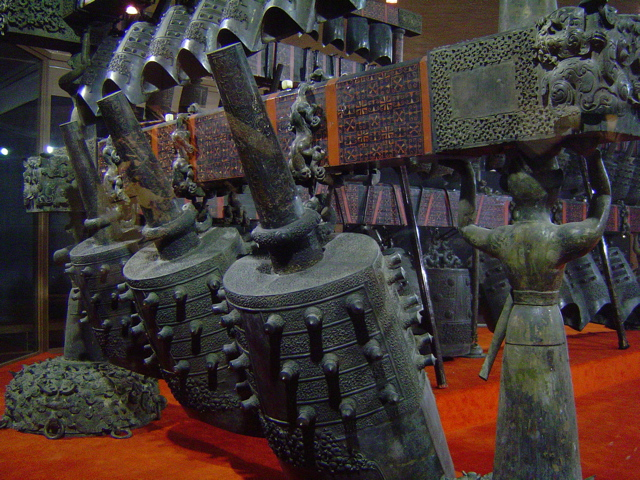

== See also ==
- List of museums in China

=== Other museums in Hubei Province ===
- Wuhan Museum
- Wuhan Zhongshan Warship Museum
- Wuhan Revolutionary Museum
- Changjiang Civilization Museum (Wuhan Natural History Museum)
- Xinhai Revolution Wuchang Uprising Memorial Hall
- Hubei Museum of Ancient Architecture from the Ming and Qing Dynasties
- Yifu Museum of China University of Geosciences
- Jingzhou Museum
- Yichang Museum
- Suozhou Museum
- Huangshi City Museum
- Shiyan City Museum
