= Bianzhong =

Ancient Chinese musical instrument

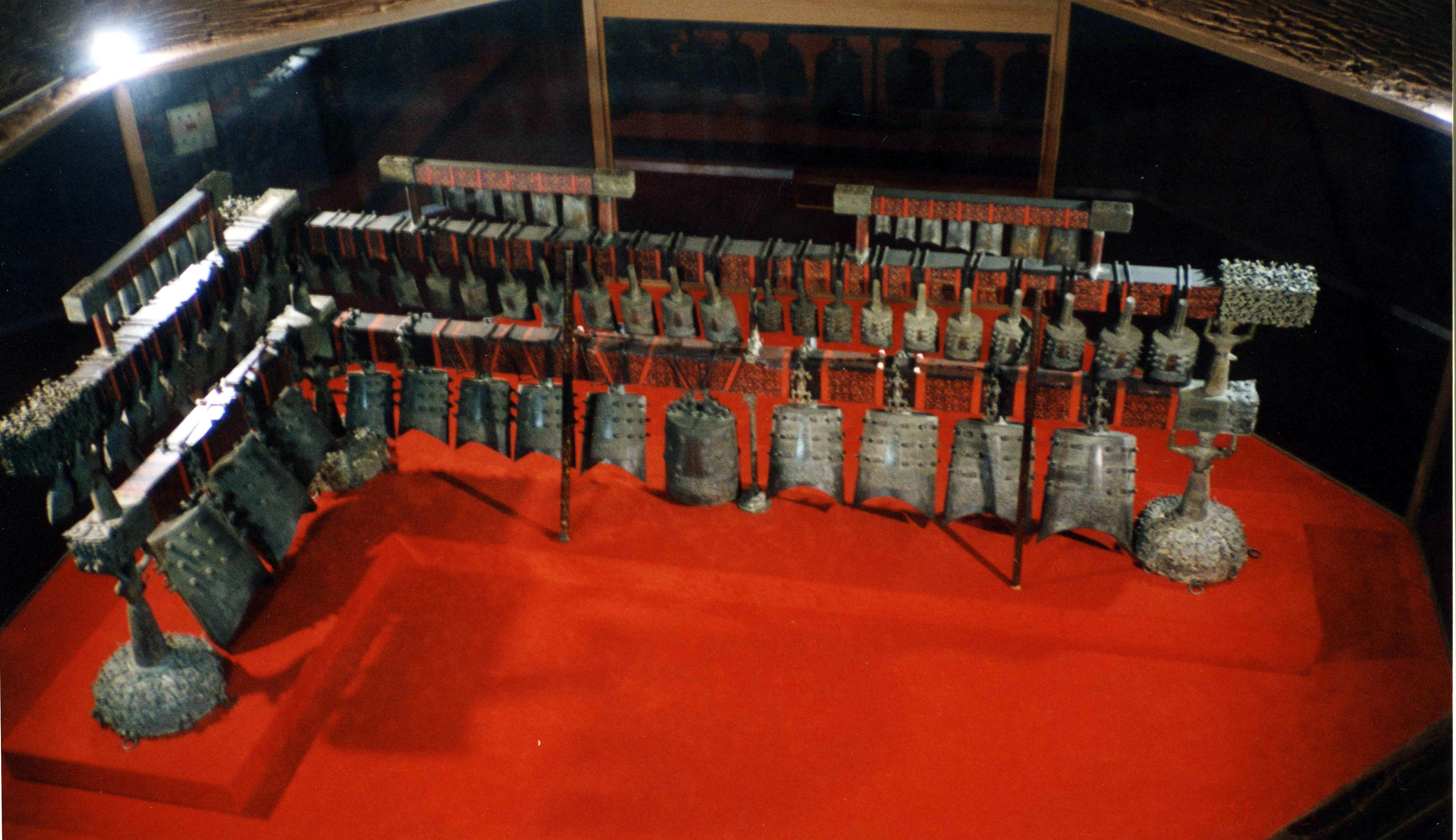
- Bianzhong of Marquis Yi of Zeng, dated 433 BC

Chinese name
- Traditional Chinese: 編鐘
- Simplified Chinese: 编钟
Transcriptions
Standard Mandarin
- Hanyu Pinyin: biānzhōng
- Wade–Giles: pian^{1}-chung^{1}
- Yale Romanization: byān-jūng
Yue: Cantonese
- Yale Romanization: pīn jūng
- Jyutping: pin1-zung1
Southern Min
- Hokkien POJ: pian-tsing

Korean name
- Hangul: 편종
- Hanja: 編鐘
Transcriptions
- Revised Romanization: pyeonjong
- McCune–Reischauer: p'yŏnjong

Bianzhong (Chinese: 編鐘; pinyin: biānzhōng;) is an ancient Chinese musical instrument consisting of a set of bronze bells, played melodically. China is the earliest country to manufacture and use musical chimes. They are also called chime bells. These sets of chime bells were used as polyphonic musical instruments and some of these bells have been dated at between 2,000 and 3,600 years old. They were hung in a wooden frame and struck with a mallet. Using a wooden hammer and a rod to beat the bronze bell can make different pitch. Along with the stone chimes called bianqing, they were an important instrument in China's ritual and court music going back to ancient times.

Several sets of bianzhong were imported to the Korean court during the Song dynasty. Pronounced in Korean as pyeonjong, the instrument became an important part in Korea's ritual and court music and is still in use. In Vietnam, the instrument, which was used in ceremonies in the court at Huế, is called biên chung. The instrument's name is pronounced henshō in Japanese.

== History ==
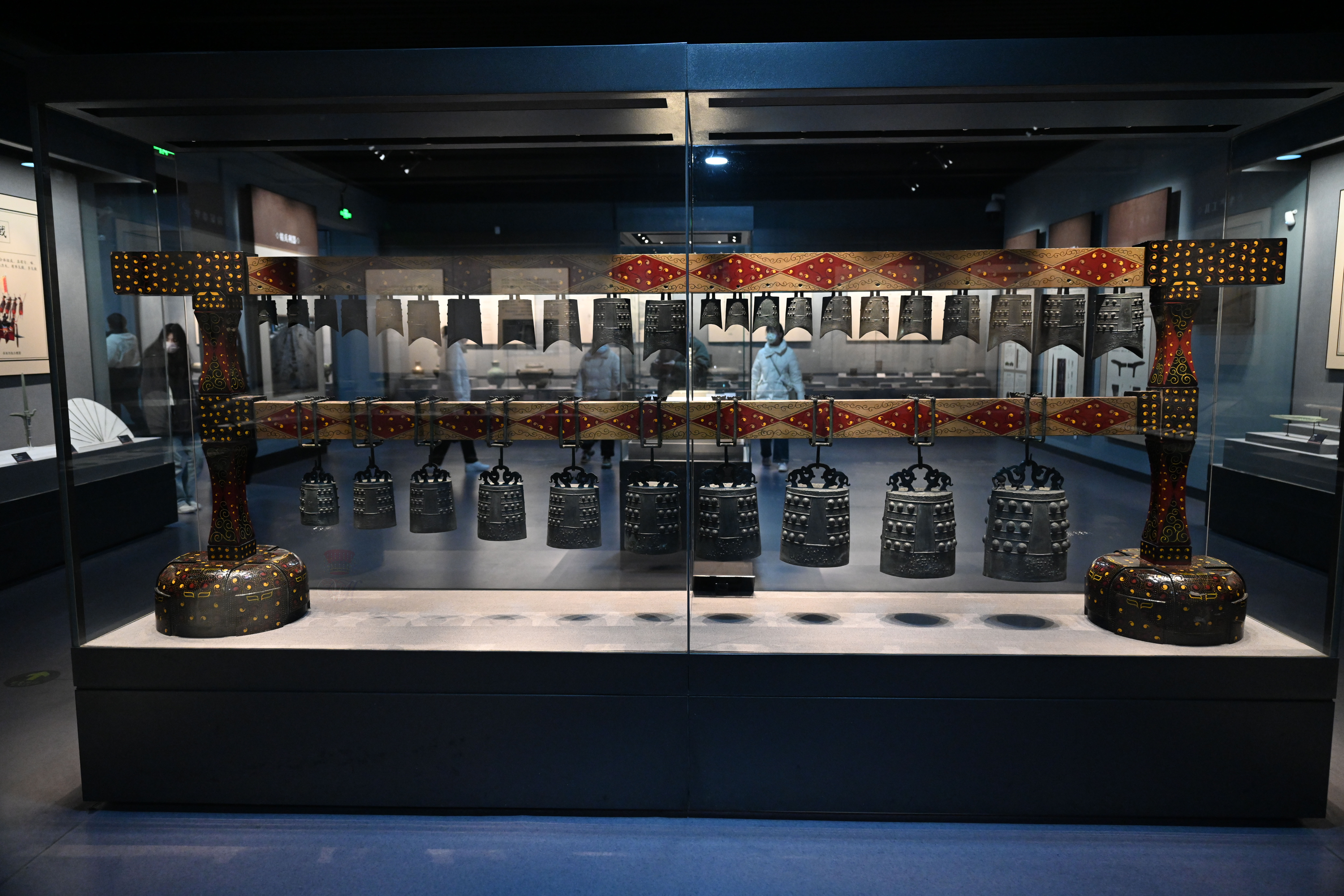
Set of bianzhong unearthed from Tianxingguan Tomb No. 2 near Jingzhou, 4th century BC

While the oldest clapperless bells in China date to as early as 2100 BCE, the organization of zhong bells into bianzhong (literally "arranged zhong") developed in the Zhou dynasty (1046–256 BCE). bianzhong from this era had varied numbers of individual zhong (between 13 and 64), each of which could produce two distinct pitches and were suspended obliquely or vertically. In ancient China, the chime was a special instrument for upper-class people and it was a symbol of power and wealth. In one set from this time period, the biggest bell was 153.4 centimeters (60.4 in) in height and weighed 203.6 kilograms (449 lb), while the smallest bell was 20.4 centimeters (8.0 in) in height and weighed 2.4 kilograms (5.3 lb).

The instrument's construction shifted dramatically in the Qin and Tang dynasties (221 BC – 907 CE). bianzhong decreased in size during this period, being limited to sets of 14, 16, and 24 bells. Due to differences in bell construction, each zhong produced only one pitch. These bianzhong were tuned either to a seven-note scale or in twelve semitones.

Musicians standardized bianzhong construction and ritual performance by the end of the Song dynasty (960–1279 CE). Typical instruments from this period consisted of 16 bells suspended vertically in a two-tiered frame. Through the Qing dynasty (1644–1911 CE) into the modern day, this construction of bianzhong remained standard. Since the rediscovery of Zhou-dynasty bianzhong by archaeologists in 1978, there has been a revitalization of the performance and construction of that form of the instrument. Modern historical-performance ensembles (such as the Hubei Song and Dance Ensemble) have been performing on reconstructions of Zhou-dynasty bianzhong nationally and internationally since the 1980s.

In the modern day, Confucian ritual celebrations in Korea still utilizes bianzhong. The instrument's role is to lead the orchestra (doubling the melody of the winds and strings), while larger bells punctuate hymn phrases.

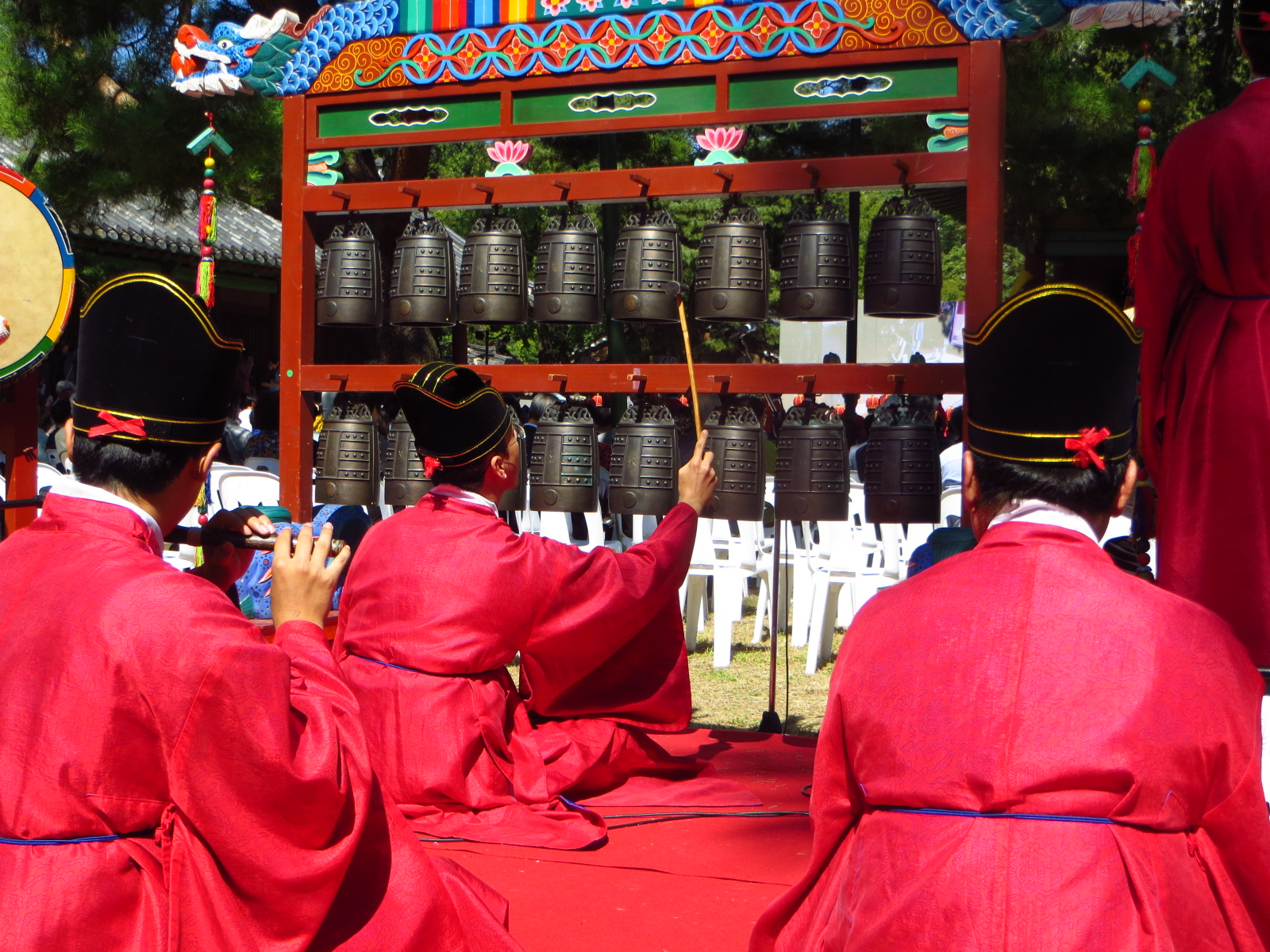
Korean pyeonjong – Confucian ritual at Munmyo Shrine, Sungkyunkwan seowon

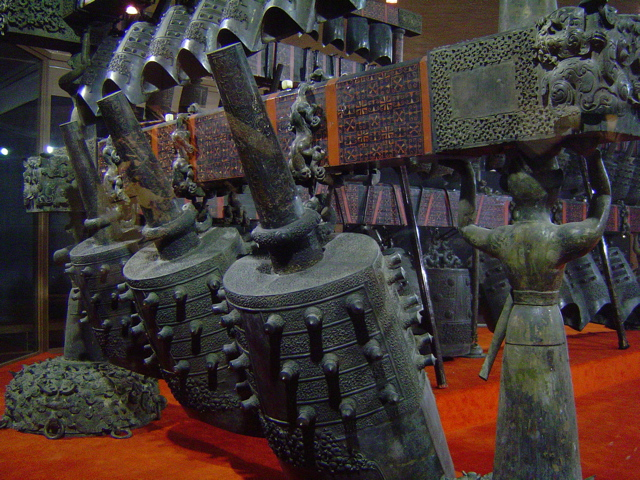
Close-up of the bianzhong of Marquis Yi of Zeng

== Structure ==
The bianzhong was part of a larger category of ancient Chinese bells referred to as a zhong. This is defined by a leaf-shaped cross-section, concave mouth (or rim) and an overall shape expands slightly from top to bottom. All sets of bianzhong were suspended together in a wooden frame, but how they were suspended can differ. The most common type of suspension in the zhong family is when the bell has an elongated handle with a small ring at its base and is then hung at a diagonal angle. Some bianzhong have been found to be suspended vertically by a loop, but this is found less frequently. Each bianzhong has the same thickness, which means that the pitch is determined by size.

The general range of bianzhong height is 15–40 centimetres (5.9–15.7 in); however, archaeologists have discovered some that are as small as 9 centimetres (3.5 in) and as large as 153 centimetres (60 in). Individual bianzhong usually have many decorative features; these could include raised rectangular ribs, repetitive claw-like (or horn-like) designs, and protrusions in clusters (typically four clusters).

== Archaeology ==
Among the most important sets of bianzhong discovered are a complete ceremonial set of 65 zhong bells, found in a near-perfect state of preservation during the excavation of the tomb of Marquis Yi, who died c. 430 BCE. Yi was the ruler of Zeng, one of the minor states under control of the major State of Chu. This region is now part of the present-day Hubei province. The instrument is currently on display at the Hubei Provincial Museum in Wuhan, China. It under protection by the government as an esteemed cultural relic, and has been performed on three times since its excavation in 1978, the most recent being for the Hong Kong Reunification ceremony in 1997.

Although tuned bells have been created and used for musical performance in many cultures, zhong are unique among all other types of cast bells in several respects. They have a lens-shaped (rather than circular) section, the bell mouth has a distinctive "cutaway" profile, and the outer surfaces of the large bells feature 36 studs or bosses, symmetrically placed around the body in four groups of nine. This special shape gives zhong bells the remarkable ability to produce two different musical tones, depending on where they are struck. Striking the center of the bell produces the primary tone, while the left or right corners produce a secondary pitch either a major or minor third higher, equivalent to a distance of four or five notes on a piano.

The bells of Marquis Yi cover a range of five octaves, and are fully chromatic in the central three octaves. The set—still in playable condition after almost 2,500 years—is able to produce both diatonic and pentatonic scales.

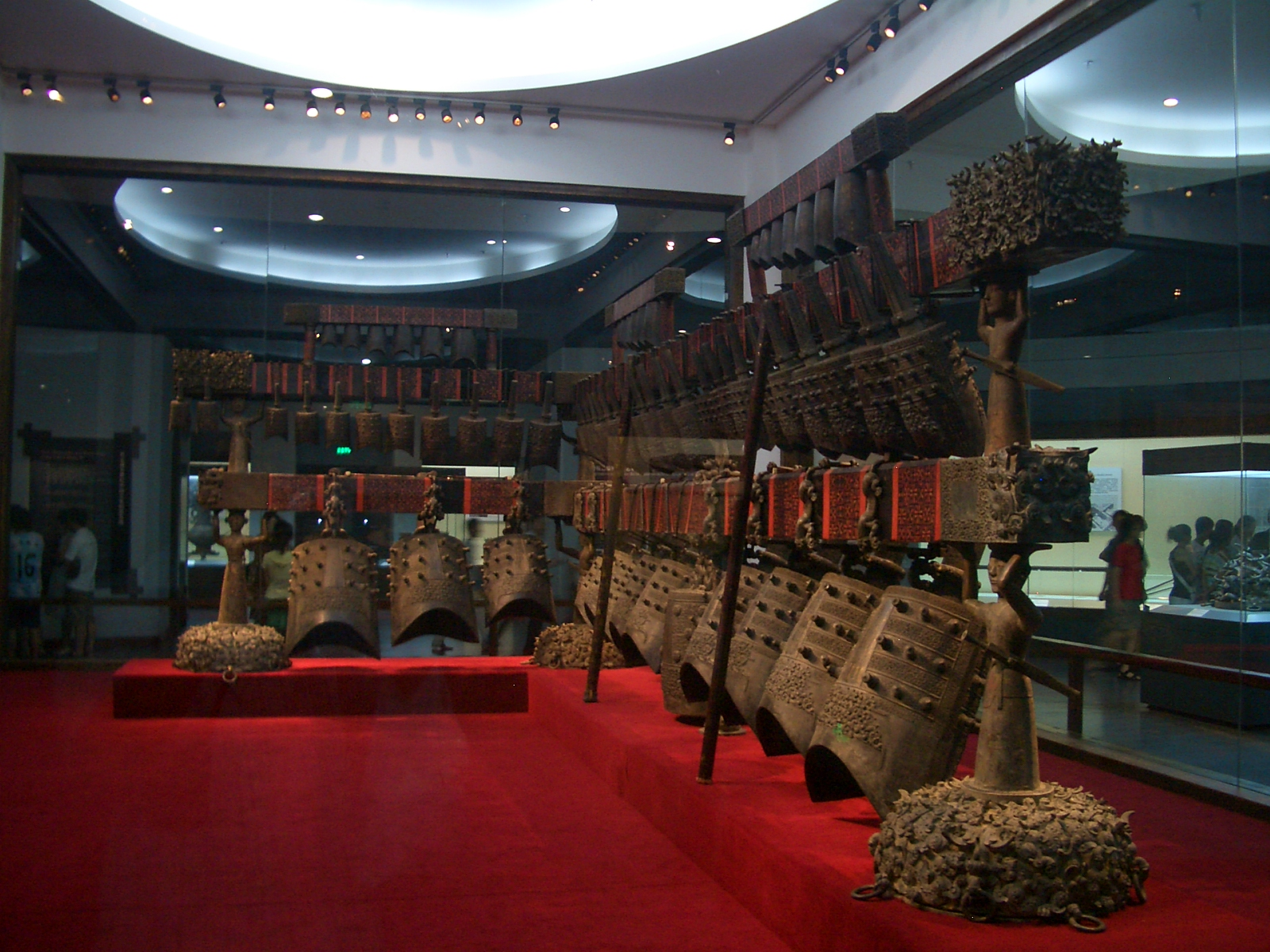
The Marquis Yi bianzhong on display in the Hubei Provincial Museum

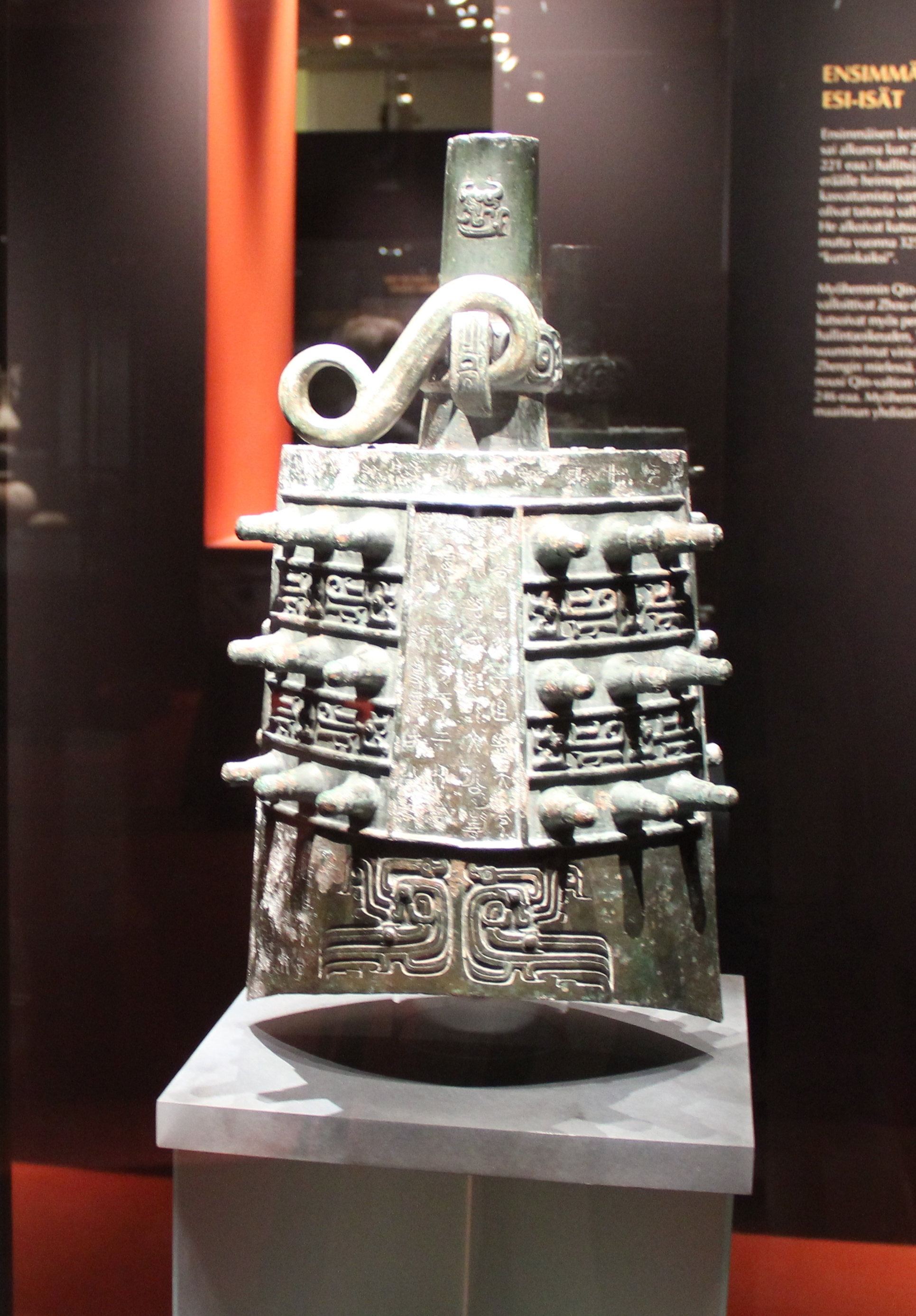
Bronze Zhong Bell from Spring and Autumn period; excavated in 1978 from the storage pit in Taigongmiao village, Baoji city, Shaanxi province

The bianzhong chimes of Marquis Yi are mounted on intersecting racks set at 90 degrees to each other, consisting of two pairs of massive wooden beams, with three smaller beams (carrying the highest bells) mounted on top of the upper beams. The beams are separated and supported at their ends and intersections by six bronze human figurines with upraised arms and wearing swords; the upper three figures are slightly smaller than the lower, which are cast on their own elaborately decorated bronze pedestals. The ends and intersection of each pair of beams are fitted with decorated bronze caps and front part of the brackets supporting the largest bells are cast in the shape of animals. The longer pair of main beams are provided with extra support in the middle in the form of two slender bronze columns.

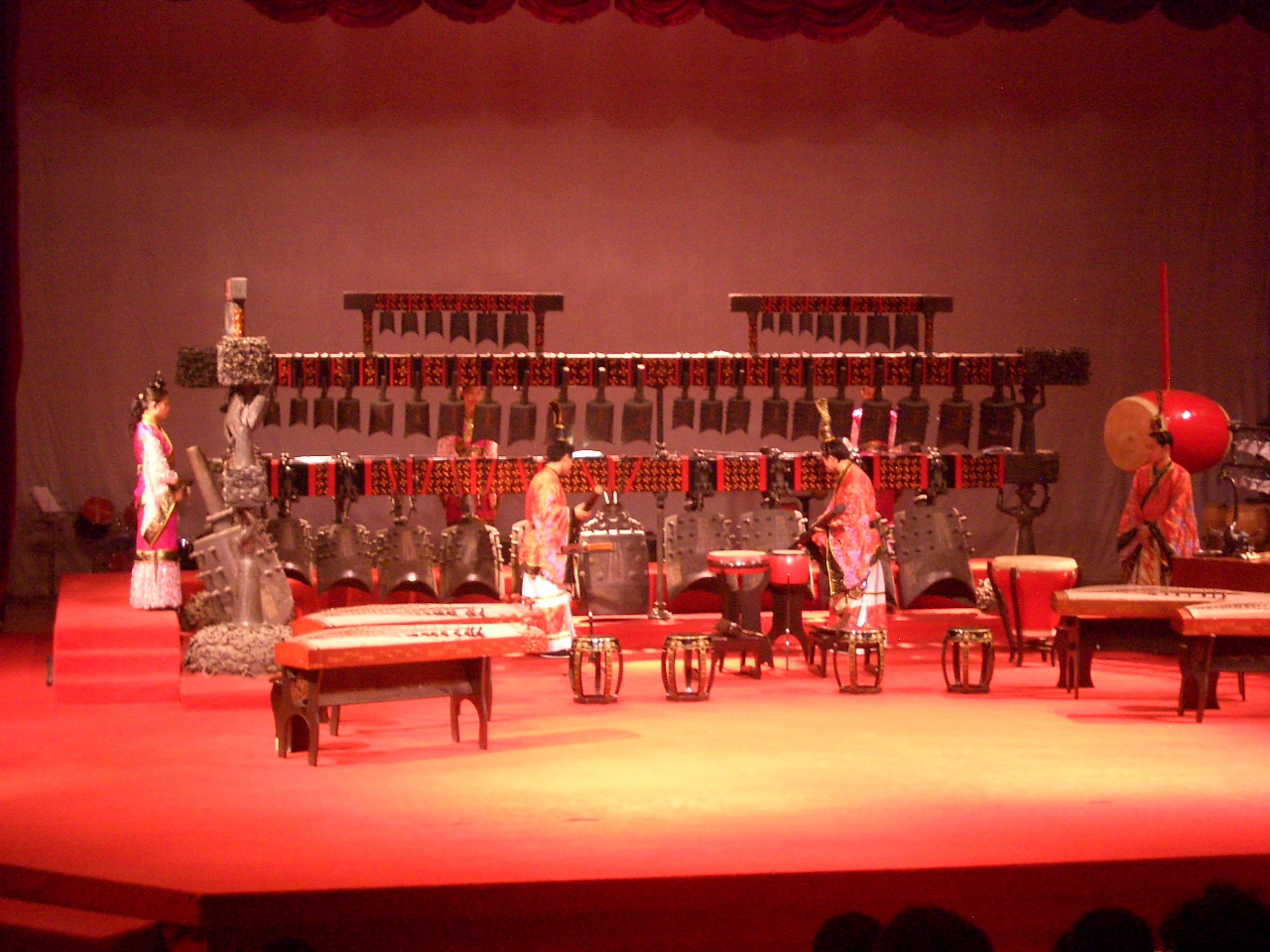
Musicians performing on a modern replica of Marquis Yi's bell set in Hubei Provincial Museum

In 1992, Ma Chengyuan, director of the Shanghai Museum, purchased the 3,000-year-old Jin Hou Su bianzhong (晉侯穌鐘) from the Hong Kong antique market. The bells had been looted from the tombs of the rulers of the State of Jin and smuggled out of China. The bells are now listed by the Chinese government as one of the first 64 national treasures forbidden to be exhibited abroad.

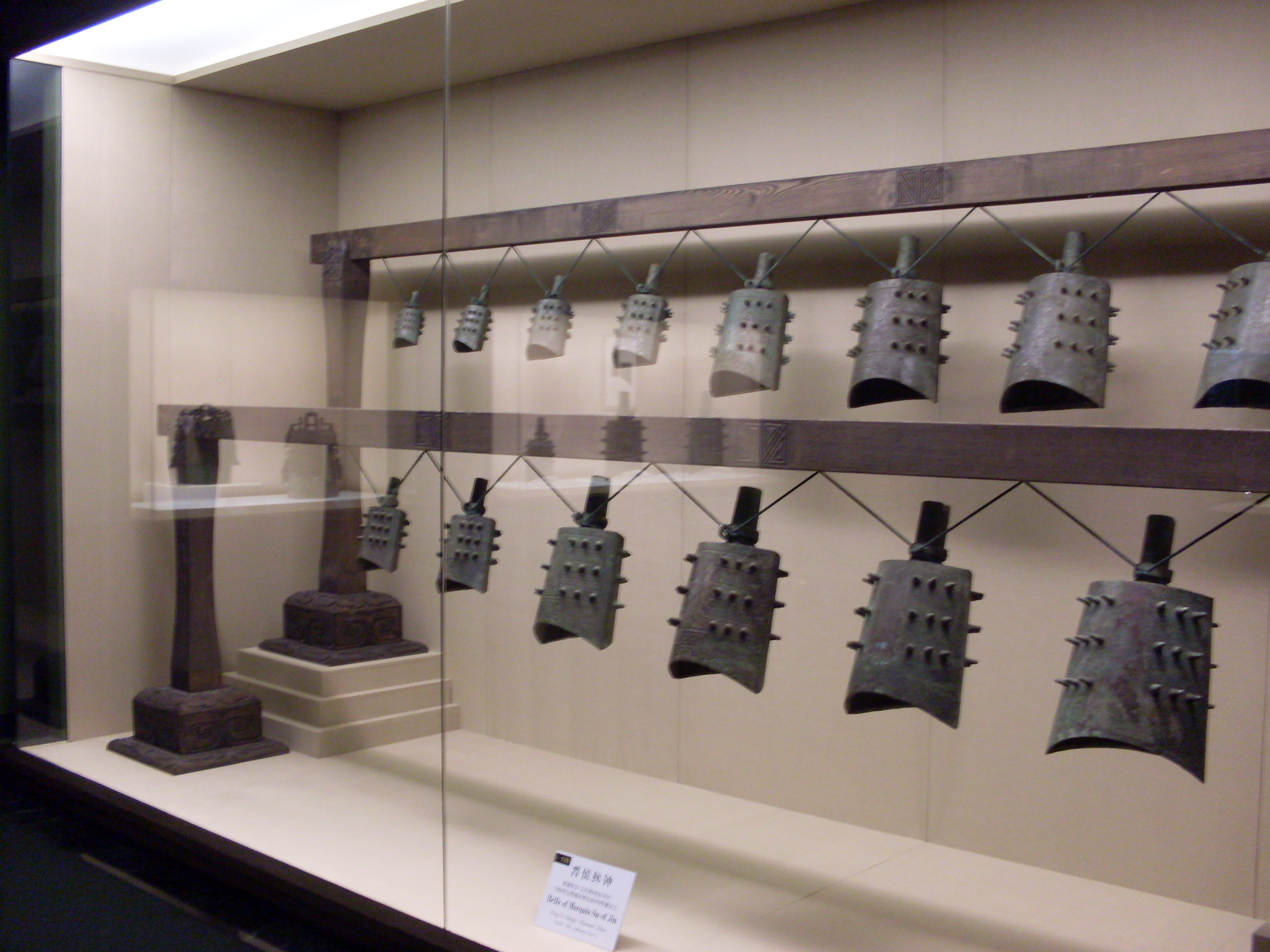
The Jin Hou Su bianzhong in the Shanghai Museum

These bells usually have inscriptions on them from which scholars use as references for studying ancient Chinese writings (also known as Bronzeware script). Another related ancient Chinese musical instrument is the bianqing, which was made of stone rather than metal.

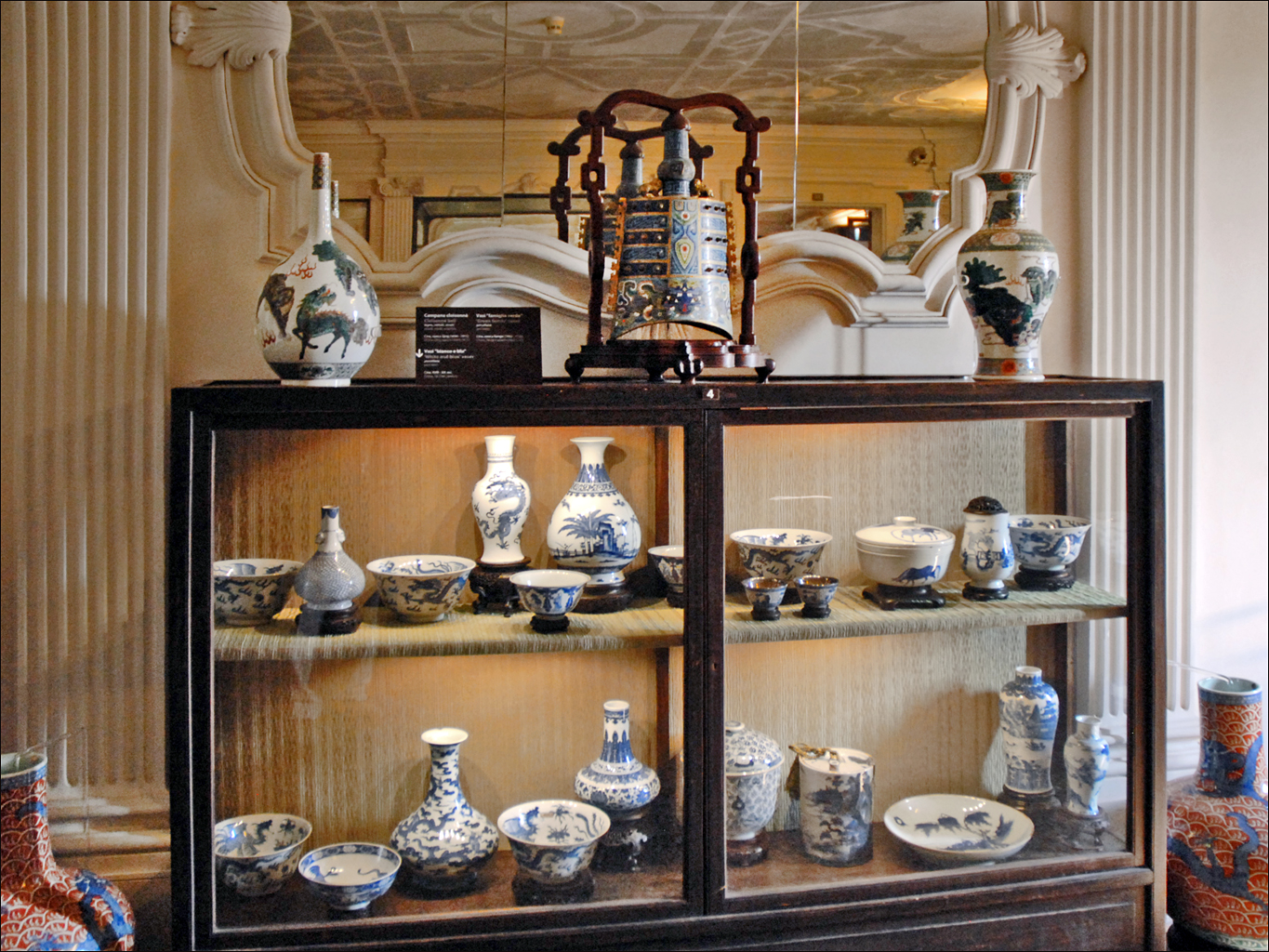
A collection of various porcelain wares from the Kangxi reign (1661–1722) of the Qing dynasty. A porcelain bianzhong is seen on the top middle.

== See also ==
- Bianqing
- Traditional Chinese musical instruments
- Traditional Korean musical instruments
- Carillon, a western multi-bell instrument where the bells have clappers
