= Bianzhong of Marquis Yi of Zeng =

Ancient Chinese musical instrument made of bells

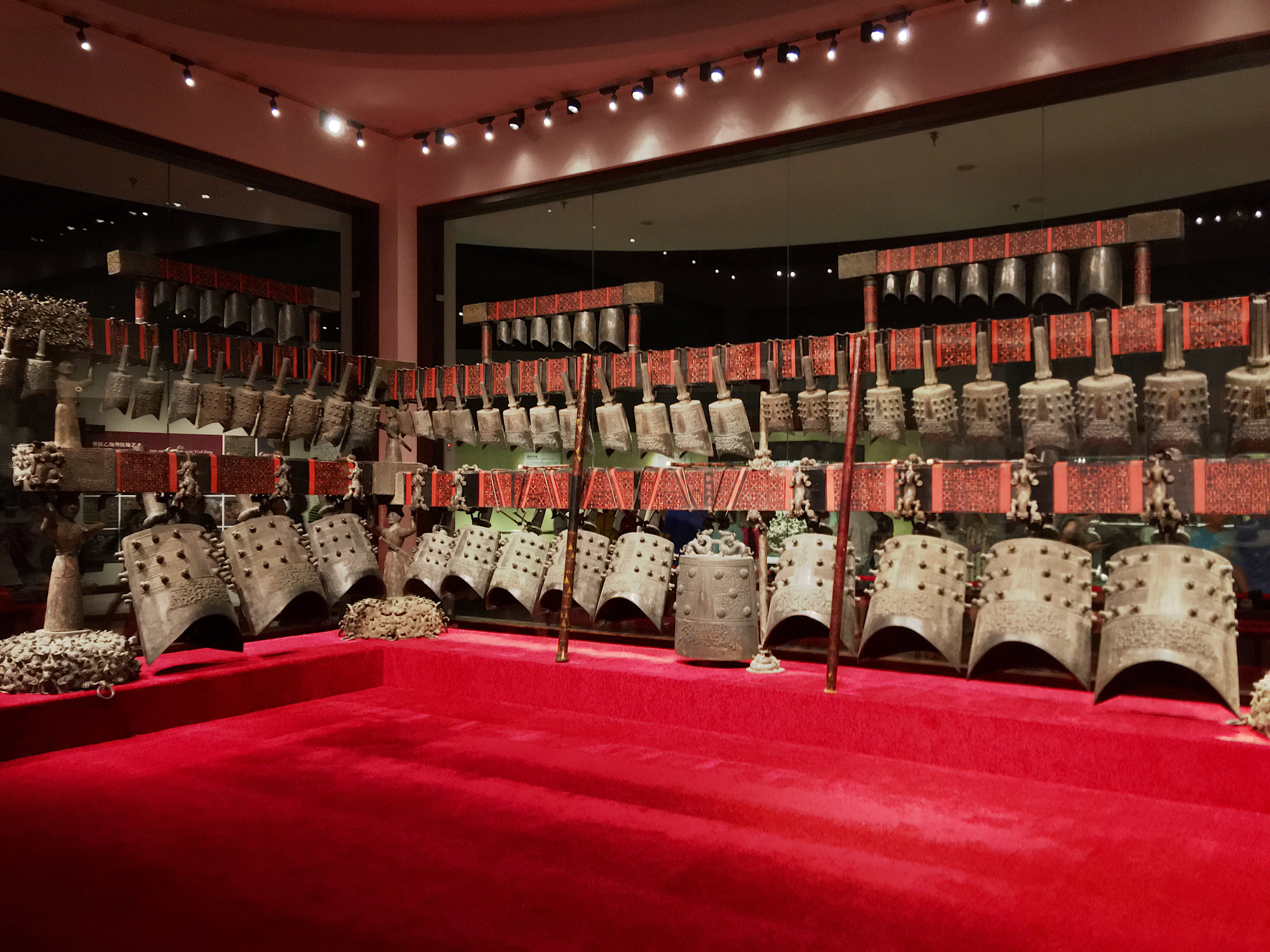
Zenghouyi Bells

The Bianzhong of Marquis Yi of Zeng (simplified Chinese: 曾侯乙编钟; traditional Chinese: 曾侯乙編鐘; pinyin: Zēnghóuyǐ Biānzhōng), or Zenghouyi Bells, is the name given to an ancient musical instrument made of bells (called bianzhong) unearthed in 1978 in the Tomb of Marquis Yi of Zeng in Leigudun Community (擂鼓墩社区), Nanjiao Subdistrict (南郊街道), Zengdu District, Suizhou (then 'Sui County'), Hubei Province, China. The bianzhong were made in 433 B.C.

The bianzhong are hung on two sets of wooden racks. One rack is 7.48 metres (24.5 ft) long and 2.65 metres (8 ft 8 in) wide. The other rack is 3.35 metres (11.0 ft) long and 2.73 metres (8 ft 11 in) wide. The two racks are perpendicular to each other.

The instrument contains a total of 64 bianzhong, which are hung at three levels and are divided into eight groups. There are 19 bells in three groups at the top level. 33 bells are in three groups in the middle level. There are 12 bells in two groups at the bottom level.

The biggest bell is 153.4 centimetres (60.4 in) in height and weighs 203.6 kilograms (449 lb) weight. The smallest bell is 20.4 centimetres (8.0 in) in height and weighs 2.4 kilograms (5.3 lb).

Each bell can play two tones with three degrees' interval between them. The tonal range of Zenghouyi Bells is from C2 to D7. In the middle area of the tonal range, it can play all twelve half tones.

The wooden hammers used to strike the bells were also unearthed from the Tomb of Marquis Yi of Zeng.

The original bells are on permanent display at the Hubei Provincial Museum in Wuhan. Copies have been made for other museums.

== See also ==
- List of Chinese cultural relics forbidden to be exhibited abroad
