= Tomb of Marquis Yi of Zeng =

Archaeological site in Hubei, China

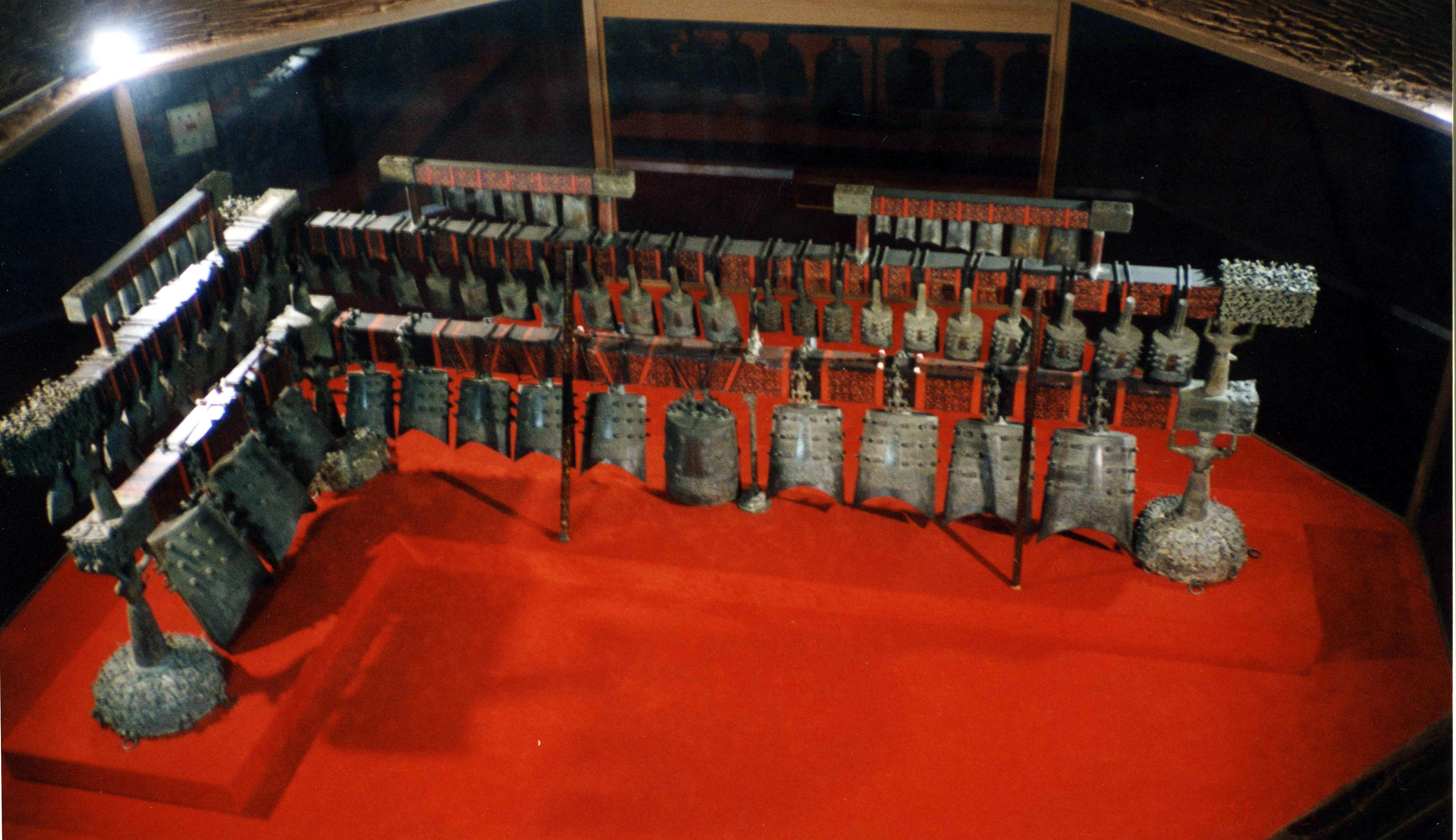
Top view of the Bianzhong of Marquis Yi of Zeng

The Tomb of Marquis Yi of Zeng (Chinese: 曾侯乙墓; pinyin: Zēng Hóu Yǐ mù) is an archaeological site in Leigudun Community (擂鼓墩社區), Nanjiao Subdistrict (南郊街道), Zengdu District, Suizhou (during the Spring and Autumn period called Sui County), Hubei, China, dated sometime after 433 BC. The tomb contained the remains of Marquis Yi of Zeng (sometimes "Duke Yi"), and is one of a handful of ancient Chinese royal tombs to have been discovered intact and then excavated using modern archaeological methods. Zeng was a state during the Spring and Autumn period of China. The tomb was made around 433 BC, either at the end of the Spring and Autumn period or the start of the Warring States period. The tomb comes from the end of the thousand-year-long period of the burial of large sets of Chinese ritual bronzes in elite tombs, and is also unusual in containing large numbers of musical instruments, including the great set of bells for which it is most famous.

== Discovery and layout ==
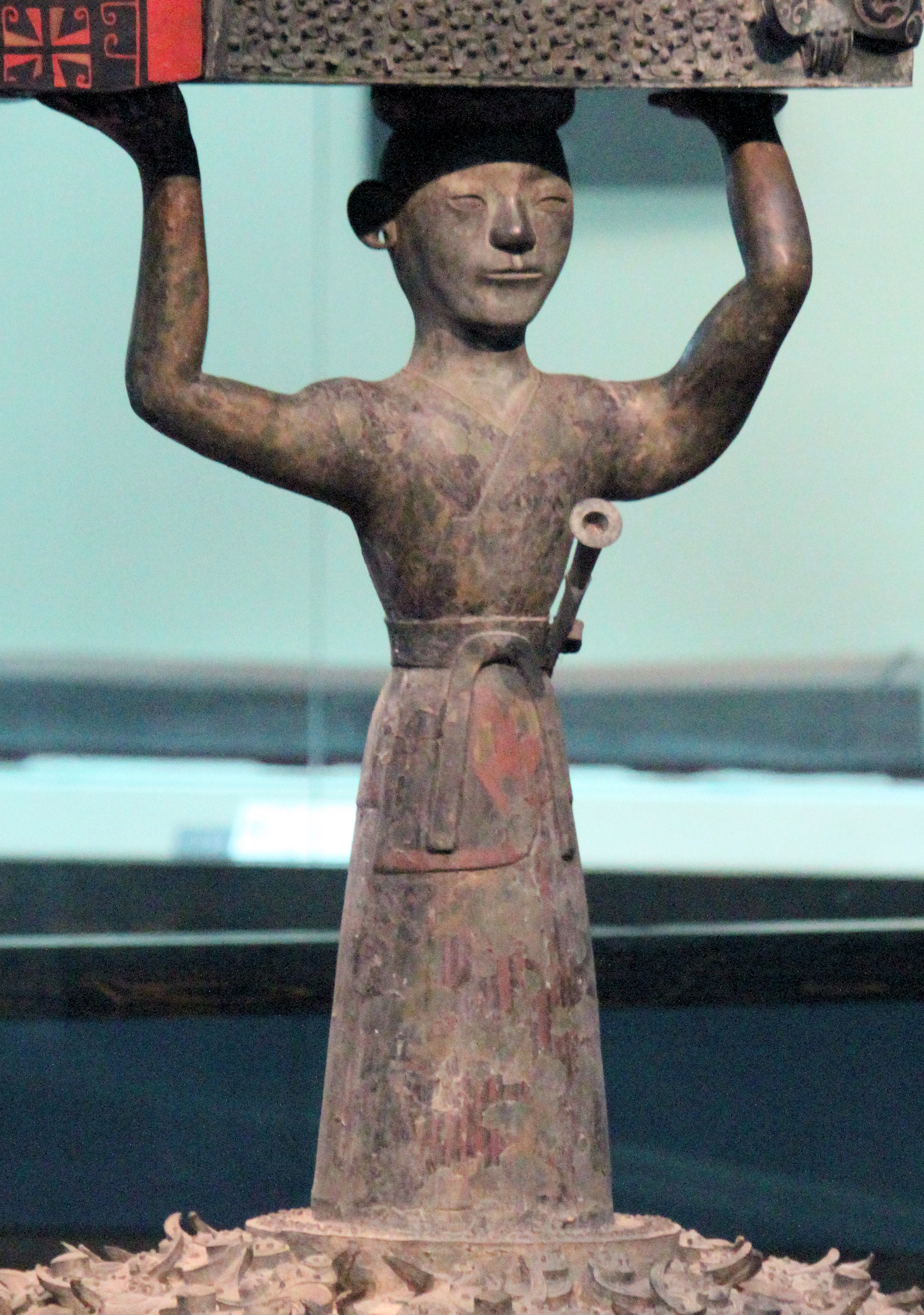
One of the anthropomorphic posts in the musical instrument, about 60 cm tall

The People's Liberation Army accidentally discovered the tomb in 1977 while destroying a hill to build a factory at Leigudun. The tomb was constructed of large wooden timbers and covers an area of 220 square meters. The date "jiayin 3rd day" (甲寅三日) written on an astronomical diagram on a lacquered clothing chest from the tomb is believed to be the date of the Marquis's death or an important date in his life, and has been extrapolated to the evening of the 3rd day of the third lunar month of 433 BC.

The tomb is divided into four separate chambers, resembling the layout of a palace of the day. The northern chamber is the smallest and contained military artifacts. The eastern chamber contained the tomb of Marquis Yi, who was buried in a wooden lacquer coffin nested inside a larger lacquer coffin. This chamber also contained eight other coffins that held the remains of eight women. The western chamber contained thirteen coffins that held the remains of thirteen other women. The central chamber is the largest, and contained a large ensemble of ritual musical instruments, including a set of 64 bianzhong (bronze bells).

In 1981, a less well-preserved and smaller tomb was discovered about 100 meters away, containing the remains of a woman related to Marquis Yi. This tomb contained a less extravagant set of 36 bronze bells and other musical instruments.

== Contents ==
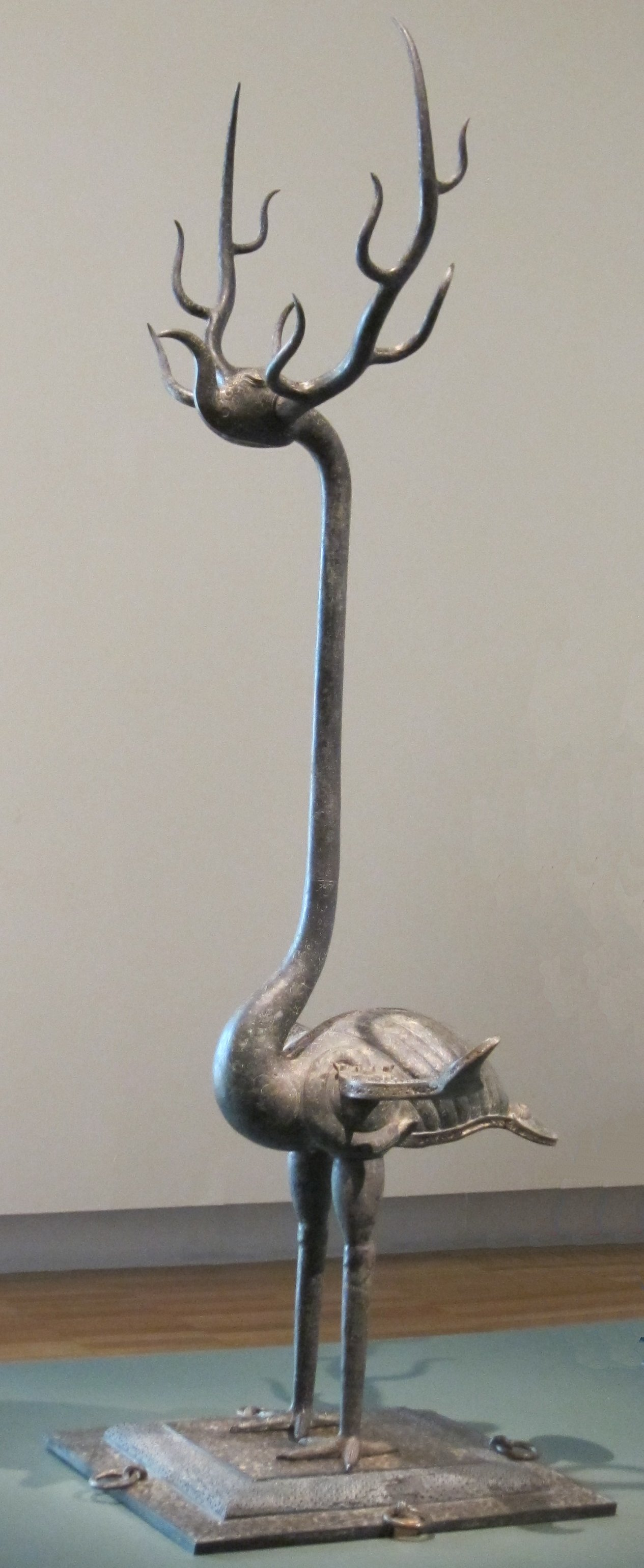
Bronze statue of an "antlered crane" from the tomb

=== Musical instruments ===
The most famous discovery at the tomb is the large set of 64 bianzhong bells, mounted on an elaborate framework, which required a cast of five members to be played, and were struck with wooden mallets to produce music. The bells are two-toned, producing two distinct tones when struck at the center or the side. This property is due to the bells' almond-shaped cross-section. The bells cover a range of five octaves. The collection also contains a non-matching bell, a memorial to Marquis Yi from King Hui of Chu, recording King Hui's rushed trip from the west to create the bell and attend the Marquis's funeral during the 56th year of King Hui's reign; the inscription on the bell dates the event to 433 BC. The bells were inscribed with music notations that detailed the relationship among the pitch standards of Zeng, Chu and Zhou.

Other musical instruments in the ensemble include stone chimes. Various string instruments were also discovered in the tombs, including se, qin and zhu. The tomb also contained pan flutes (paixiao), flutes and special sheng, each made from a one-piece body through a time-consuming procedure; a gourd would be placed inside a mold that held the desired shape of the instrument. Once the gourd matured, it would take the shape of the mold that conformed to the desired musical properties of the instrument.

=== Ritual bronzes ===
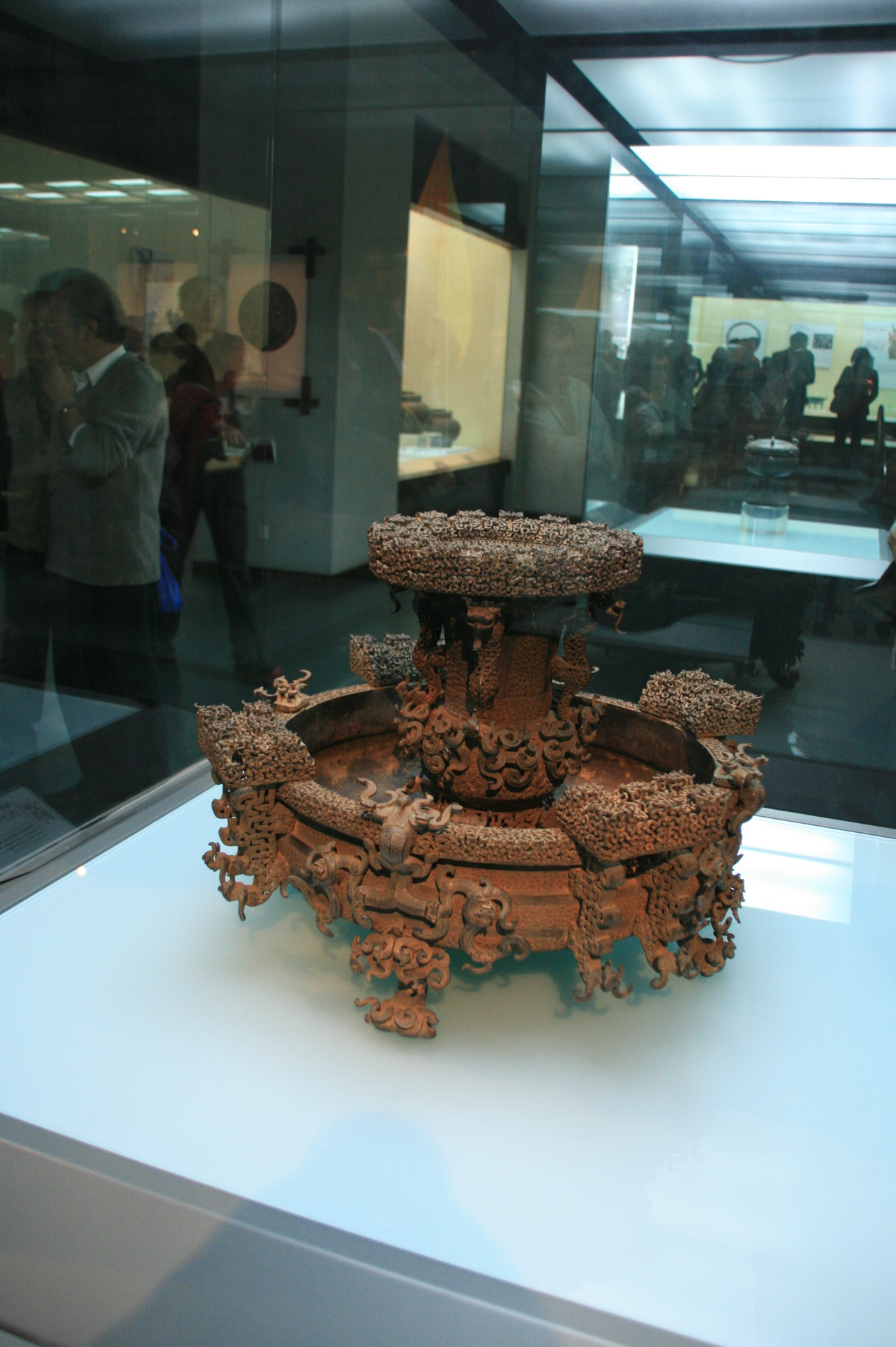
Zun pan (尊盘) vessel

Along with the Late Shang dynasty tomb of Fu Hao, the tomb represents one of the largest sets of ritual bronze vessels to be properly recorded at the site. Most of the large number of ritual bronzes extant are individual pieces, or pairs, with no archaeological context recorded, but it is becoming clear that most pieces would have originally come from large groups deposited in an elite tomb.

The tomb had a total of 88 vessels and implements such as ladles and shovels, with many matching sets of a particular type of vessel. The decoration of the vessels is highly elaborate, with many protruding elements. The largest vessel is a unique pan wine vessel in two pieces, 33 cm high and nearly as wide. There are two different sets of the ding type of cauldron, typically a key component of late sets of vessels: 9 matching open sheng ding, 5 matching with covers, and seven individual ding, two very large. There is a matching set of 9 of the smaller li type of cauldron. Other vessels include a set of 8 covered gui for holding grain, 4 fǔ (簠) square sacrificial vessels, 10 cups on legs, four fou, and several other pairs or individual pieces.

=== Other contents ===
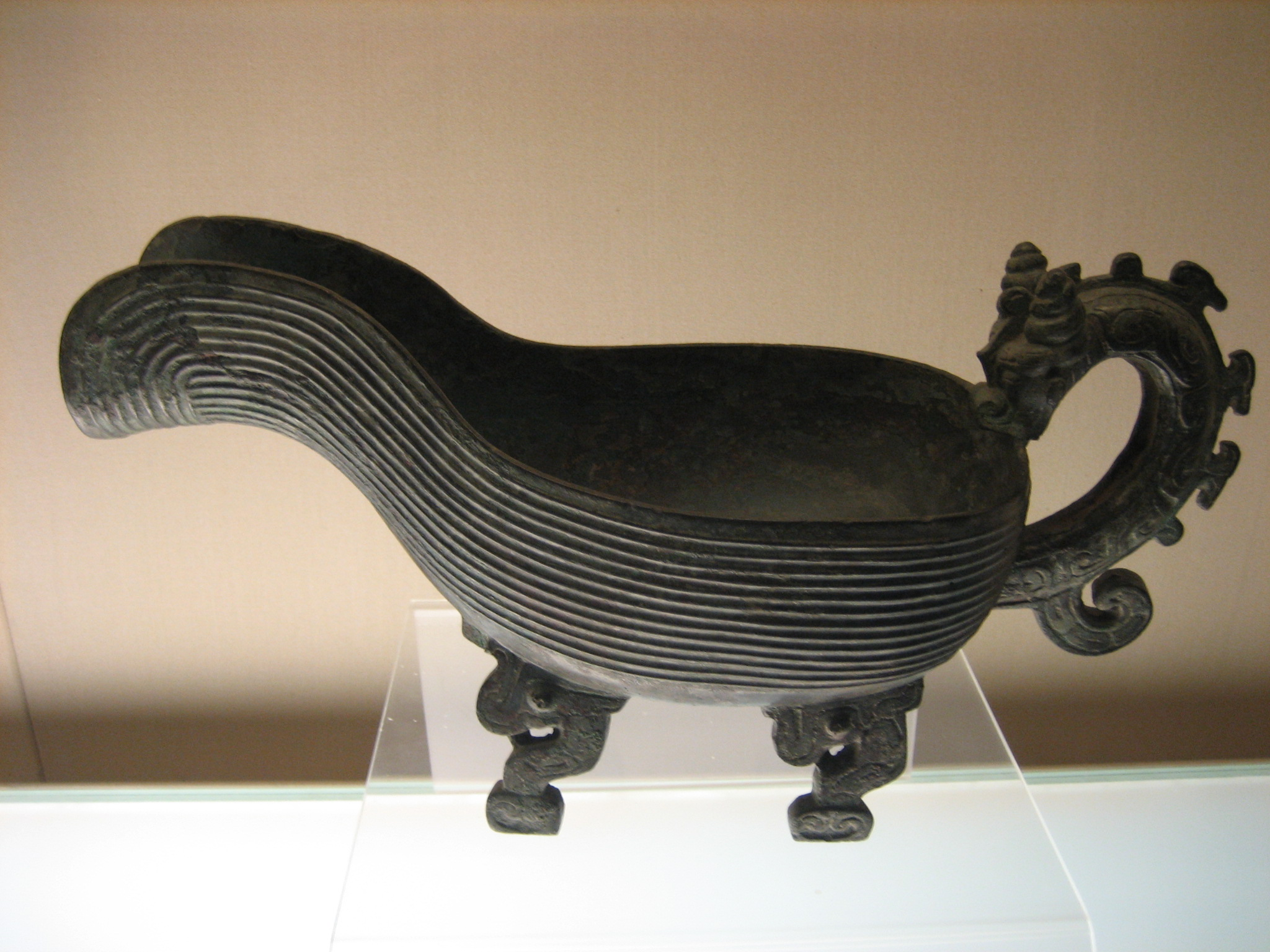
A relatively plain yi ewer, probably for hand-washing during ritual offerings

In addition to aesthetic artifacts, the tomb contained a trove of weaponry, including arrowheads, dagger-axes spear tips and chariot wheel spokes. This tomb is important in the history of ancient Chinese glass, as it contains 173 eye beads that were made in a western Asian style, similar to some found in Gilan, Iran.

The earliest examples of Chinese ink writings on bamboo (Zhujian) were discovered in this tomb, showing the calligraphic styles of the Chu or Zeng state. They recorded the people who attended the Marquis's funeral, such as the officials and royalty of the Chu and Zeng states and also included details of their transportation, such as number of horses carrying the chariots. These bamboo slips provide important information on the development of Chinese brush calligraphy.

== See also ==
- List of Chinese cultural relics forbidden to be exhibited abroad
