= Bình Đại district =

Coordinates: 10°10′59″N 106°41′41″E

Bình Đại district Huyện Bình Đại
- District
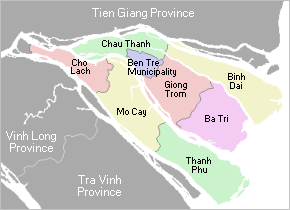
- Location in Bến Tre province
- Country: Vietnam
- Province: Bến Tre
- Capital: Bình Đại

Area
  - District: 147 sq mi (381 km^{2})

Population (2019 census)
  - District: 137,304
  - Density: 933/sq mi (360/km^{2})
  - Urban: 9,915
  - Rural: 127,389
- Time zone: UTC+07:00 (Indochina Time)

Bình Đại is a rural district of Bến Tre province in the Mekong Delta region of Vietnam. As of 2019 the district had a population of 137,304, growing from 129,446 in 2001. The district covers an area of 381 km^{2}. The district capital lies at Bình Đại.

== Administrative divisions ==
The district is divided into one township, Bình Đại (capital), and the following communes:

- Tam Hiệp
- Long Định
- Long Hòa
- Phú Thuận
- Châu Hưng
- Vang Quới Tây
- Vang Quới Đông
- Thới Lai
- Phú Vang
- Lộc Thuận
- Định Trung
- Phú Long
- Bình Thới
- Thạnh Trị
- Đại Hòa Lộc
- Bình Thắng
- Thạnh Phước
- Thừa Đức
- Thới Thuận
