= Bình Đại =

Bình Đại Phường Bình Đại
- Ward
- Location in Vietnam
- Coordinates: 10.186667°N 106.7025°E
- Country: Vietnam
- Province: Vĩnh Long Province
- Establish: June 16, 2025

Area
  - Total: 44.7 km^{2} (17.3 sq mi)

Population 2025
  - Total: 33,881 people
  - Density: 758/km^{2} (1,960/sq mi)
- Time zone: UTC+07:00

Bình Đại is a ward (phường) of Vĩnh Long Province, Vietnam.

== Geography ==
Bình Đại is a commune situated in the northeastern part of Vĩnh Long province; it is located approximately 95 km from Long Châu Ward, about 45 km (28 mi) east of An Hội, and approximately 90 km (56 mi) northeast of Trà Vinh Ward. Formerly part of Bình Đại District in Bến Tre province, the commune has the following geographical boundaries:

- To the east, it borders Thới Thuận Commune.
- To the west, it borders Thạnh Trị Commune.
- To the south, it borders Thạnh Phước Commune.
- To the north, it borders Tân Phú Đông Commune in Đồng Tháp province, with the Mỹ Tho River serving as the boundary. According to Official Dispatch No. 2896/BNV-CQĐP dated May 27, 2025, issued by the Ministry of Home Affairs, following the administrative reorganization, Binh Dai Commune covers an area of 44.7 km² and has a population of 33,881 as of December 31, 2024, resulting in a population density of 0 people/km² (statistical data calculated as of December 31, 2024, in accordance with Article 6 of Resolution No. 76/2025/UBTVQH15, dated April 14, 2025, of the National Assembly Standing Committee).

== Administration divisions ==
Bình Đại Commune is divided into 16 hamlets: 1, 2, 3, 4, 5, 6, 1 Giồng Sầm, 2 Cầu Sắt, 4 Cây Trôm, Bình Chiến, Bình Đại 1, Bình Đại 2, Bình Đại 3, Bình Hòa, Bình Thới 3, and Bình Thuận.

== History ==
On February 24, 1976, the Provisional Revolutionary Government of the Republic of South Vietnam issued a Decree regarding the dissolution of administrative zones and the consolidation of provinces in South Vietnam. Accordingly, the province of Kiến Hòa was renamed Bến Tre Province.

At that time, Bình Đại Town and Bình Đại Commune were situated within Bình Đại District, Bến Tre Province. Furthermore, Bình Đại Town served as the district seat of Bình Đại District, Bến Tre Province.

On April 3, 1979, the Council of Ministers issued Decision 141-HĐBT regarding the adjustment of commune boundaries within Bến Tre Province. Pursuant to this decision:

- Thạnh Trị Commune was established based on a portion of the natural area and population of Bình Đại Commune.
- Đại Hòa Lộc Commune was established based on a portion of the natural area and population of Bình Đại Commune.
- The remaining natural area and population of Bình Đại Commune were renamed Bình Thới Commune.
- Bình Thắng Commune was established based on a portion of the natural area and population of Bình Đại Town.

On January 20, 2016, the Ministry of Construction issued Decision 67/QĐ-BXD, recognizing the expanded Bình Đại Town as meeting the standards of a Class IV urban area. On June 12, 2025, the 15th National Assembly issued Resolution No. 202/2025/QH15 regarding the reorganization of provincial-level administrative units. Accordingly, the entire natural area and population size of the provinces of Bến Tre, Vĩnh Long, and Tra Vinh were consolidated into a new province named Vĩnh Long.

On June 16, 2025, the National Assembly Standing Committee issued Resolution No. 1687/NQ-UBTVQH15 regarding the reorganization of commune-level administrative units within Vinh Long Province in 2025 (effective from June 16, 2025). Accordingly, the entire natural area and population of Binh Dai Town, along with the communes of Bình Thắng and Bình Thới—formerly situated within Bình Đại District, Bến Tre Province—are consolidated to form a new commune named Binh Dai Commune (Clause 97, Article 1).

== Economy ==
The residents of Bình Đại Commune primarily earn their living through commerce, services, and aquaculture. Situated along National Highway 57B (formerly Provincial Road 883), Bình Đại Commune is regarded as a strategically advantageous location for the province's economic development; it serves as a vital hub for trade and exchange across the economic, cultural, and social spheres, as it radiates outward to various localities and connects with the economic corridor running along the banks of the Tiền River.
