= Mount Ngự Bình =

Mountain in Vietnam

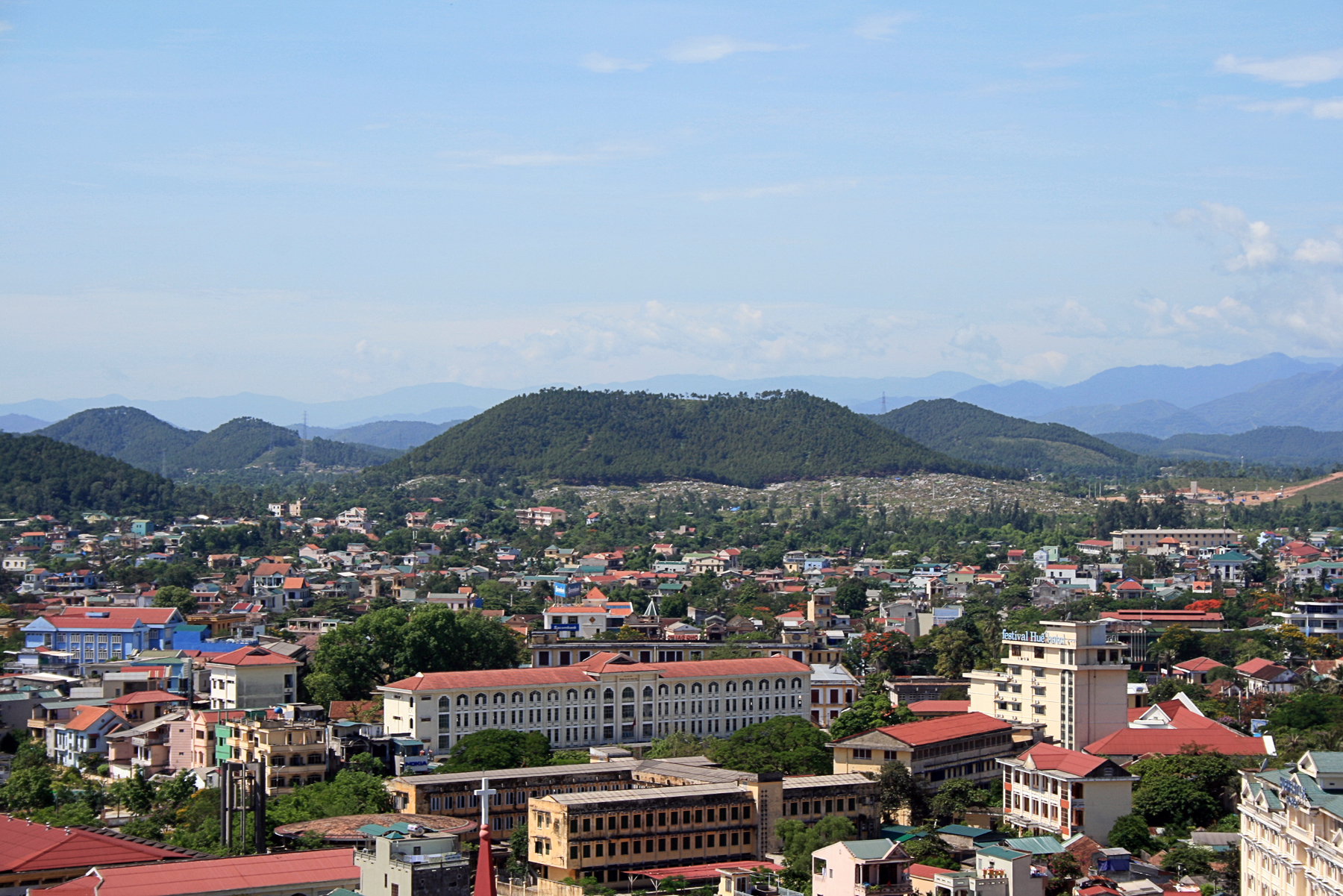
Ngự Bình mountain

Ngự Bình (Vietnamese: Ngự Bình; chữ Hán: 御屏) is a mountain in the Vietnamese city of Huế. Ngự Bình translates to "Imperial Screen".

== History ==
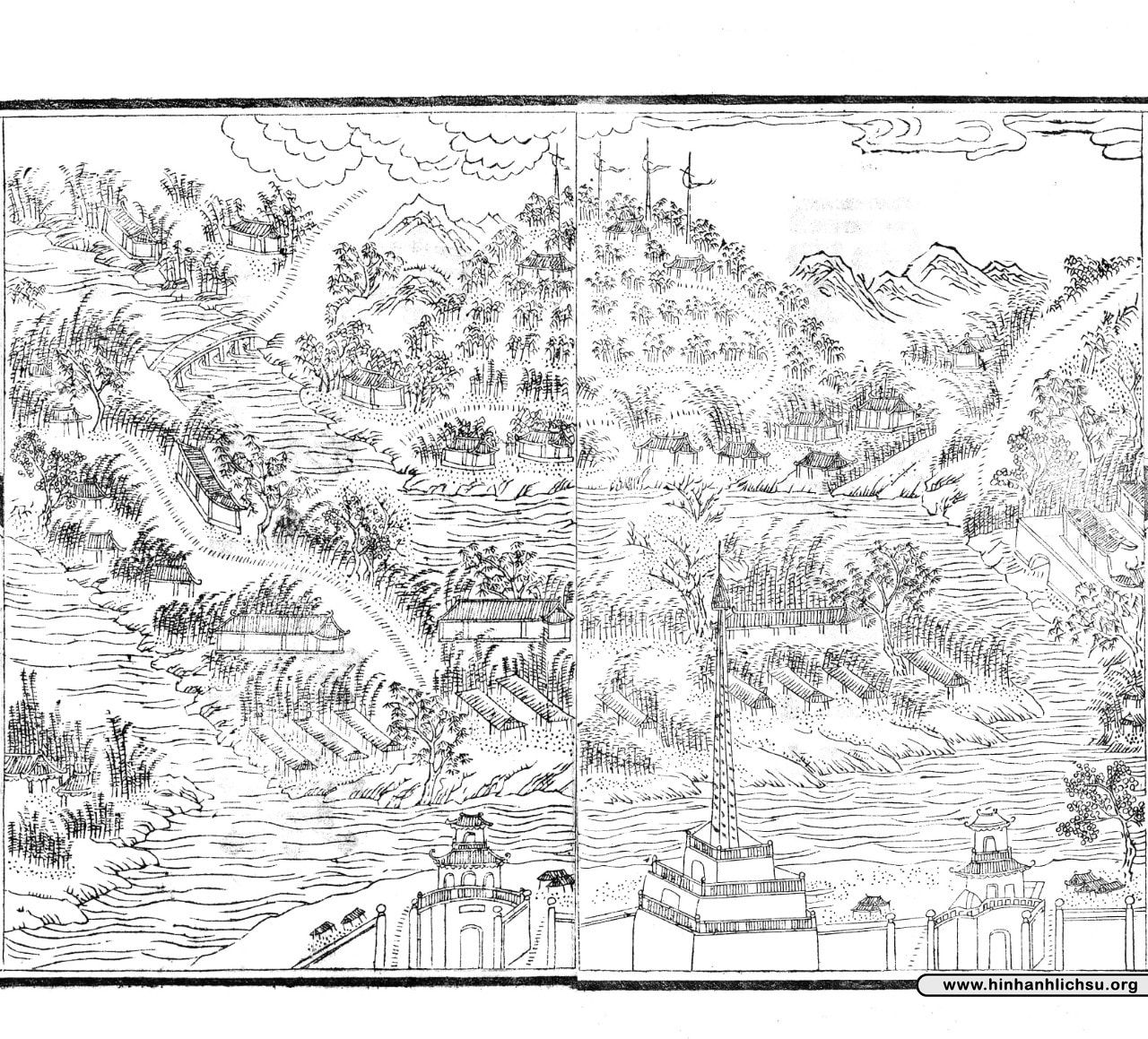
Ngự Bình Mountain in the Thần kinh thập nhị cảnh (神京二十景) set of landscape paintings painted in the 5th year of Thiệu Trị, 1845

The annals Đại Nam Nhất Thống Chí by the History Department of the Nguyễn dynasty wrote about Ngu Binh Mountain as follows: "In the northeast of Huong Thuy emerges an even surface serving as a screen, a first bar in front of the citadel. It was called Nui Bang (Even Mount) and renamed Ngu Binh in Gia Long's reign. Its top is flat with pine trees everywhere".

Together with the Perfume River, Ngu Binh Mountain forms a natural ensemble to Huế. For a long time, this mountain and the river have been the symbols of Huế, and people often call Huế, "The land of the Perfume River and Ngu Binh mount" or "Huong-Ngu Land".

For many centuries, many generations of poets and travelers have recognized it as a place to admire nature.

== Geography ==
The 105-metre (344 ft) high Ngu Binh Mountain has a symmetric figure. On both sides of the Even Mount (Bang Son) are 2 small mounts called Ta Bat Son (Left Mount) and Huu Bat Son (Right Mount). After observing that Bang Son resembled a screen, the Nguyễn emperor decided to build up Huế which became known as their "Forbidden Purple City." Emperor Gia Long approved the design of geomancers which chose this mount as a front altar of the imposing and solid defending wall system, and renamed it Ngu Binh.

The top of Ngu Binh mountain overlooks the city Huế, the Perfume River and nearby pine forests, hills and plains. Towards the east in the distance the Thuan An Estuary and further the South China Sea are visible.

Some kilometres away from Ngu Binh Mountain is Vong Canh hill, across from Ngoc Tran Mountain. From the Vong Canh hill, people can behold fruit gardens green with areca (betel nut) palms, longan trees, orange groves (including mandarin variety), grapefruit trees, etc. Mingling with pine trees, grey roofs of pagodas and temples, as well as the ancient and meditative tombs, the Perfume River looks like a soft silk strip winding at the foot of the hill.
