= Thạnh Trị =

- Commune
- Ba Lai Dam on the Ba Lai River
- Interactive map of Thạnh Trị
- Coordinates: 10.183698430218286°N 106.59669230110909°E
- Country: Vietnam
- Province: Vĩnh Long
- Region: Mekong Delta
- Established: 16 June 2025
- Seat: Ấp Ao Vuông

Area
  - Total: 73.26 km^{2} (28.29 sq mi)

Population (31 December 2024)
  - Total: 29,457
  - Density: 402/km^{2} (1,040/sq mi)

Thạnh Trị is a commune in Vĩnh Long province, Vietnam.

On 12 June 2025, the National Assembly of Vietnam adopted Resolution No. 202/2025/QH15 on the reorganization of provincial-level administrative units. Under the resolution, the entire area and population of Bến Tre province, Vĩnh Long, and Trà Vinh province were reorganized into a new province named Vĩnh Long.

On 16 June 2025, the Standing Committee of the National Assembly of Vietnam adopted Resolution No. 1687/NQ-UBTVQH15 on the reorganization of commune-level administrative units in Vĩnh Long province in 2025, effective on the same date. Under the resolution, the entire area and population of the communes of Thạnh Trị, Phú Long, and Định Trung in the former Bình Đại district, Bến Tre province, were consolidated to form a new commune named Thạnh Trị.
