= Châu Thành, Vĩnh Long =

Châu Thành
- Commune
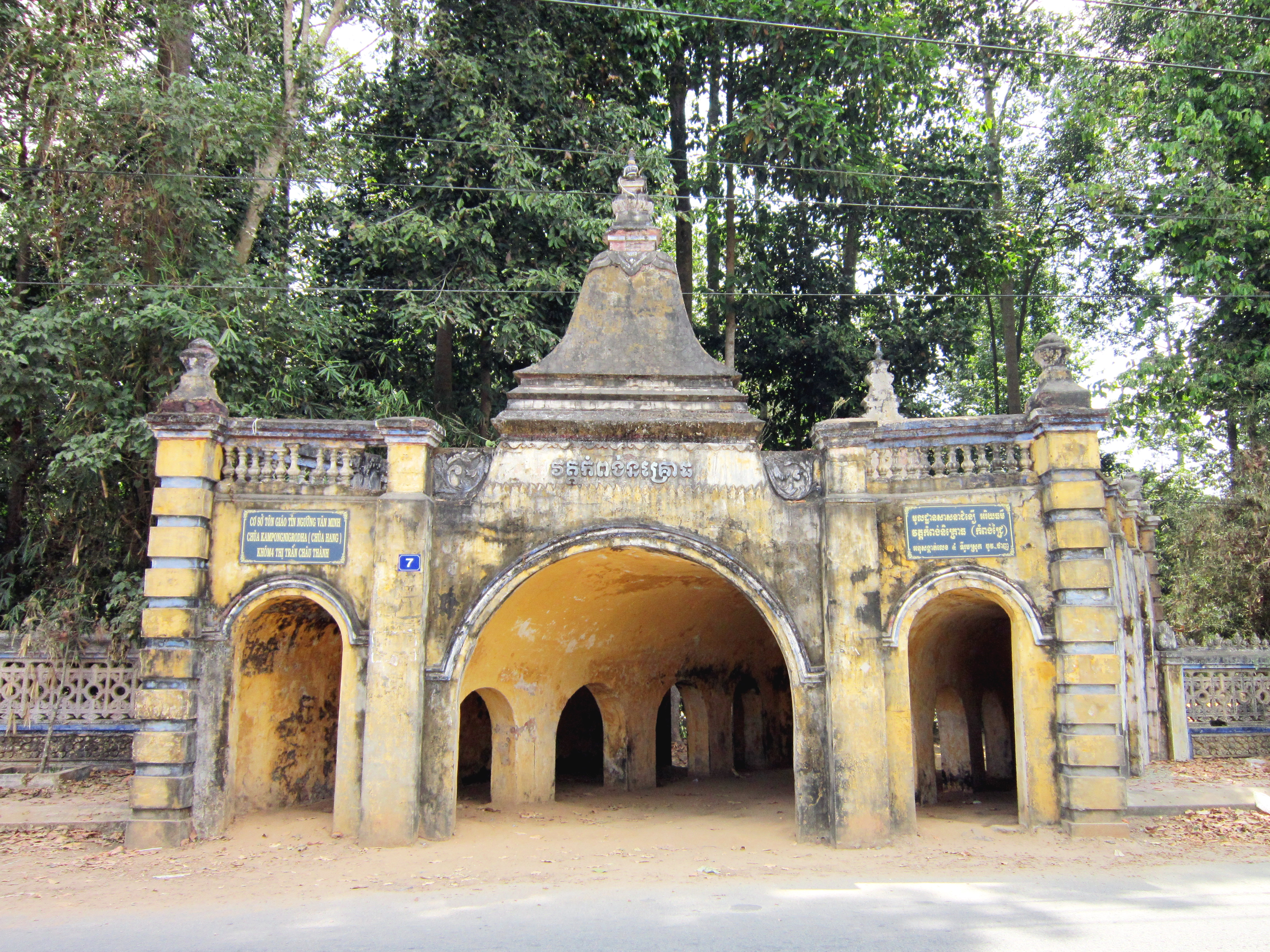
- The side gate of Kompông Chrây Pagoda (Chùa Hang) is designed to resemble a cave.

- Location within Vietnam
- Coordinates: 9°52′15″N 106°20′53″E
- Country: Vietnam
- Region: Mekong Delta
- Province: Vĩnh Long
- Time zone: UTC+7 (UTC + 7)

Châu Thành is a commune in Vĩnh Long province, Vietnam. It is one of 124 communes and wards in the province after the 2025 Vietnamese administrative reform.

== Geography ==
Châu Thành Commune is situated as follows:

- To the east, it borders Hưng Mỹ and Vinh Kim Communes.
- To the west, it borders Song Lộc and Tập Ngãi Communes.
- To the south, it borders Nhị Trường, Tập Sơn, and Hùng Hòa Communes.
- To the north, it borders Trà Vinh Ward.

Châu Thành Commune covers an area of 87.41 km²; as of 2025, it has a population of 50,560 people, resulting in a population density of approximately 578 people/km².

== Administration divisions ==
Châu Thành Commune is divided into 28 hamlets: 1, 2, 3, 4, 5, An Chay, Ba Tiêu, Bàu Sơn, Cây Dương, Đầu Giồng A, Đầu Giồng B, Giồng Lức, Giồng Trôm, Hương Phụ A, Hương Phụ B, Hương Phụ C, Kinh Xuôi, Nhà Dựa, Ô Dài, Ô Tre Lớn, Ô Tre Nhỏ, Phú Mỹ, Phú Nhiêu, Phú Thọ, Thanh Nguyên A, Thanh Nguyên B, Thanh Trì A, and Thanh Trì B.

== History ==
On August 29, 1994, the Government issued Decree 99-CP concerning the establishment of Châu Thành Township, based on the adjustment of a portion of the area and population of Đa Lộc Commune. On October 15, 2019, the People's Council of Trà Vinh Province issued Resolution 157/NQ-HĐND regarding the merger of a portion of Khóm 2 into Khóm 5.

Châu Thành Town is divided into 5 *khóm* (residential clusters): 1, 2, 3, 4, and 5.

On June 16, 2025, the National Assembly Standing Committee issued Resolution No. 1687/NQ-UBTVQH15 regarding the reorganization of commune-level administrative units in Vĩnh Long Province in 2025. ...arrangement of commune-level administrative units in Vĩnh Long Province in 2025. Accordingly, the entire natural area and population of Chau Thanh Town and the communes of My Chanh, Thanh My, and Da Loc were consolidated to form a new commune named Chau Thanh Commune.

Following the merger, Chau Thanh Commune encompasses a natural area of 87.41 km² and a population of 50,560 people.
