= Đầm Sen Park =

Amusement park in Ho Chi Minh City, Vietnam

Coordinates: 10.7661°N 106.6383°E

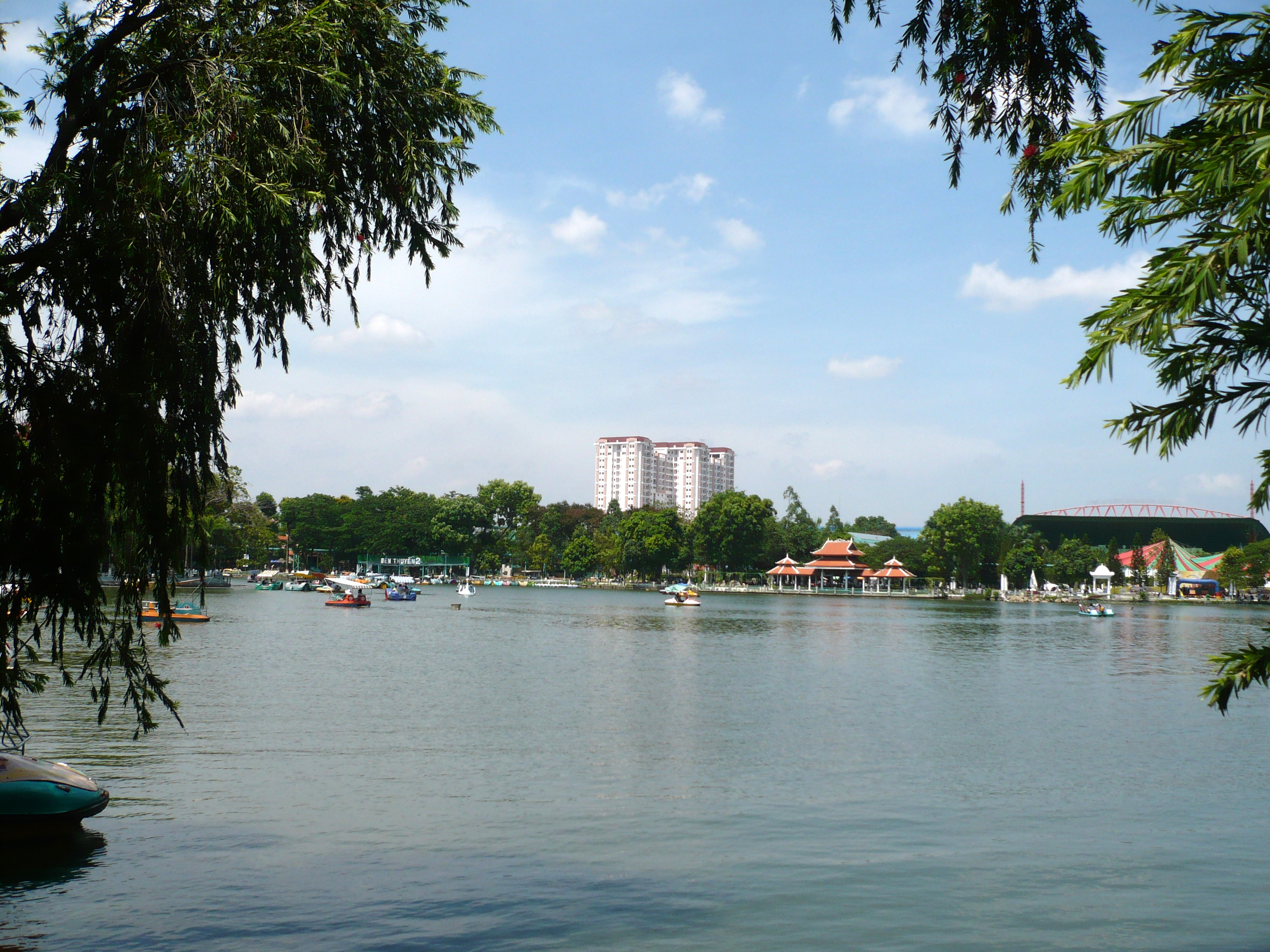
Đầm Sen Lake

Dam Sen Cultural Park (Vietnamese: Công viên Văn hóa Đầm Sen) is an amusement park located in Bình Thới ward, Ho Chi Minh City, Vietnam. The park has an area of 50 hectares, of which 20% comprises lakes and 60% trees and gardens.

== Attractions ==
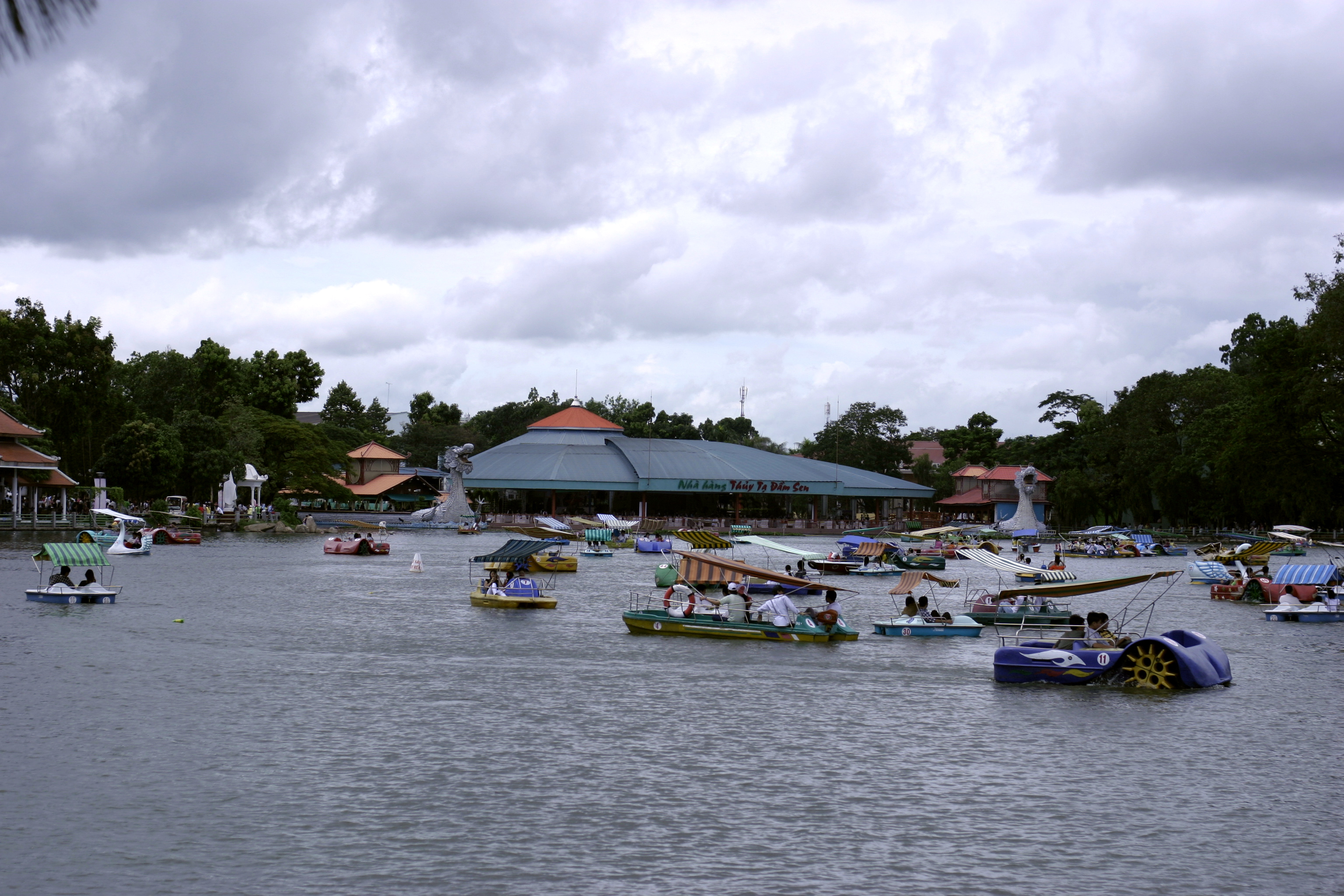
Paddle boats on West Lake.

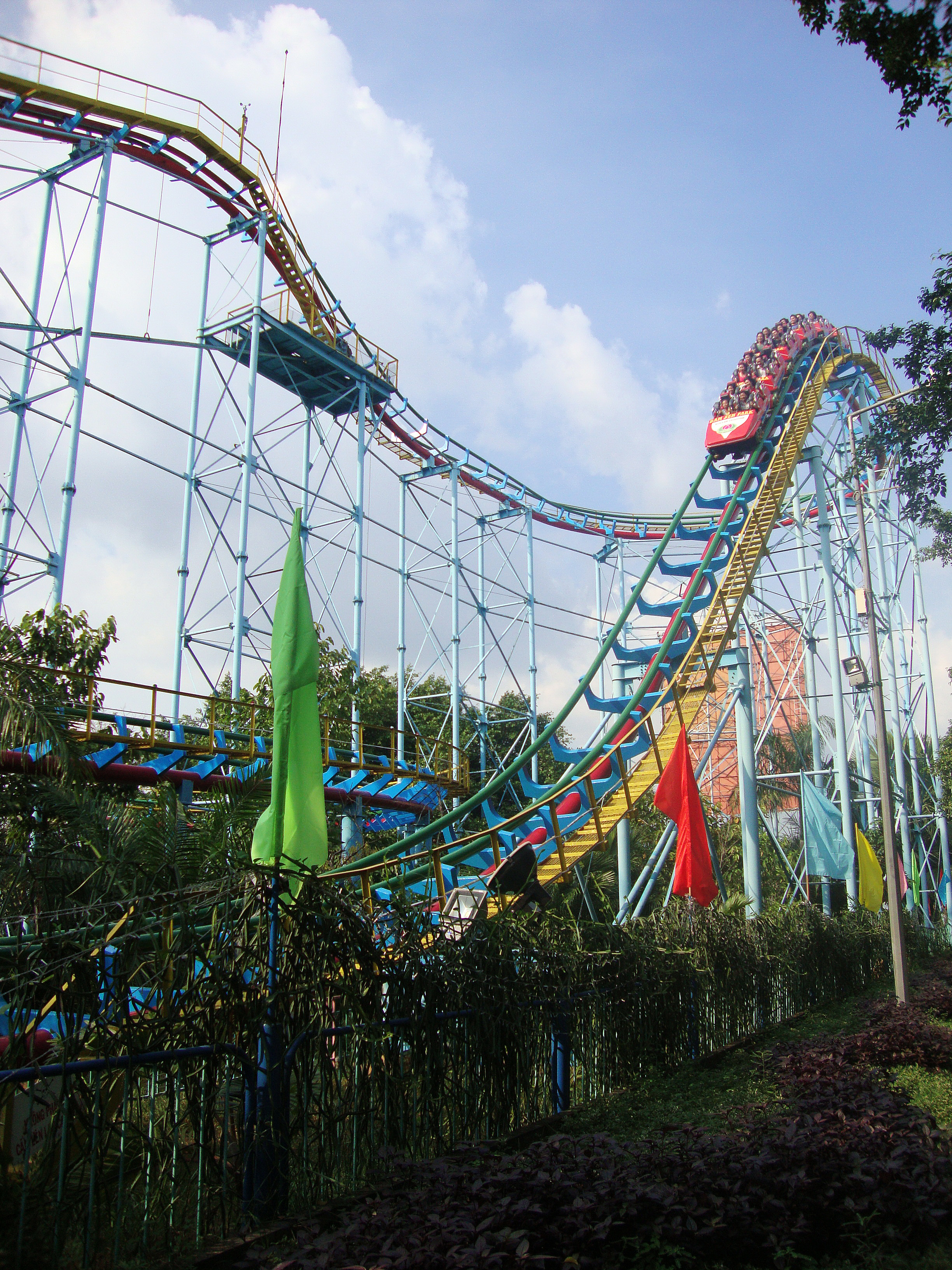

The park comprises 30 areas: an electronic games zone, folk tales theater, antique castle, square, small west lake, Nam Tu royal garden, rock garden, and water palace, dancing island, sea life center, subaquatic puppet theater, ancient Giac Vien pagoda, butterfly garden, fishing area, ky long display zone, tea store, adventure games zone, swan lake, horse’s gallop lake, western flower garden, ancient Rome-themed square, cultural square, water musical scene, bowling area, sport services area, crayfish fishing lake, Thuy Ta restaurant, children's play area, picture lamps, nine fragment edge, Monorail station, and Monorail track.

The tropical garden contains more than 70 species of birds and 20 species of animals. A 22-meter-high rock garden contains several waterfalls and caves, the largest cavern of which is decorated as a water palace and holds many colorful fishes. The Nam Tu royal garden features an orchidaceous garden and valuable bonsai ornamental trees. The park's adventure playgrounds and activities, including slide yard, electric cars, high-speed slide train, and water park, are popular with teenagers.

The park has a number of features unique in Vietnam: its 2km monorail, affording views from five meters above the ground; adventure boats that cross the waterfall; and the unusual "Roman" square, featuring European flowers including roses, classical Roman-style stone pillars, statues, and a musical water show with 3,000 seats. This water display, located just behind the European flower garden, was built in 2005 at a cost of 12 billion dong and placed behind the Europe flower garden. It features a musical performance on a specially designed stage featuring water sprays and laser lights, with films projected onto a 28-meter-high screen of water. The technique was based on a similar display in Sentosa Island (www.sentosa.com.sg), Singapore.

== History ==
Before 1975, the land on which Dam Sen now stands was wild marshland. Between 1976 and 1978 the land was drained and turned over to cultivation by workforces mobilized by the People's Committee of Ho Chi Minh City.

By 1983 the project covered around 30 hectares of water and vegetation, and its management was delegated from the city to the 11th District. The 11th enlisted three groups; the good corporation, cultural company, and seafood enterprise, to run the park.

In 1989, the operation of the project switched to Phu Tho Travel Service Company, a new unit split from Distinct 11 Foods Corporation.

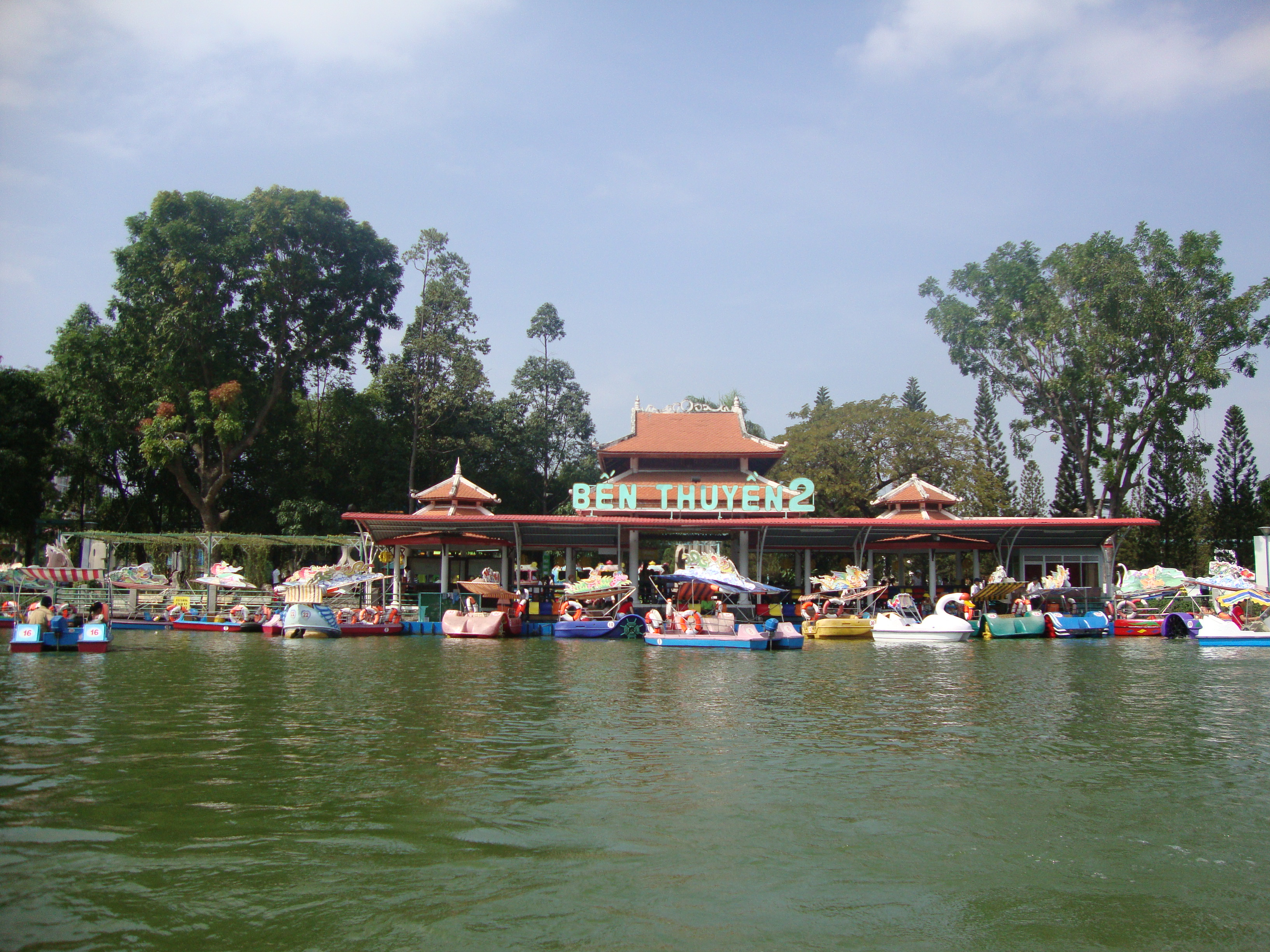
Wharf 2

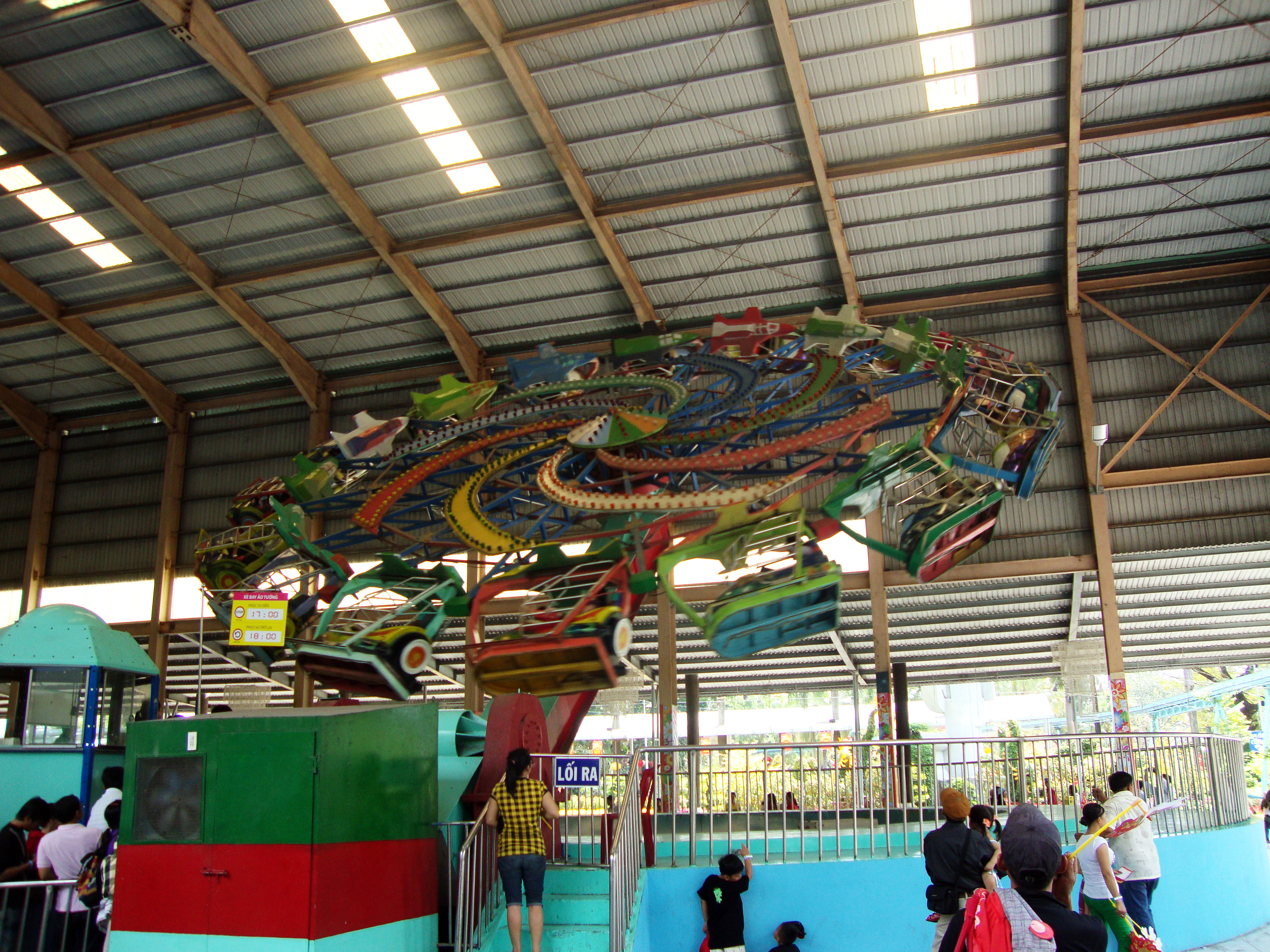
"Enterprise" ride

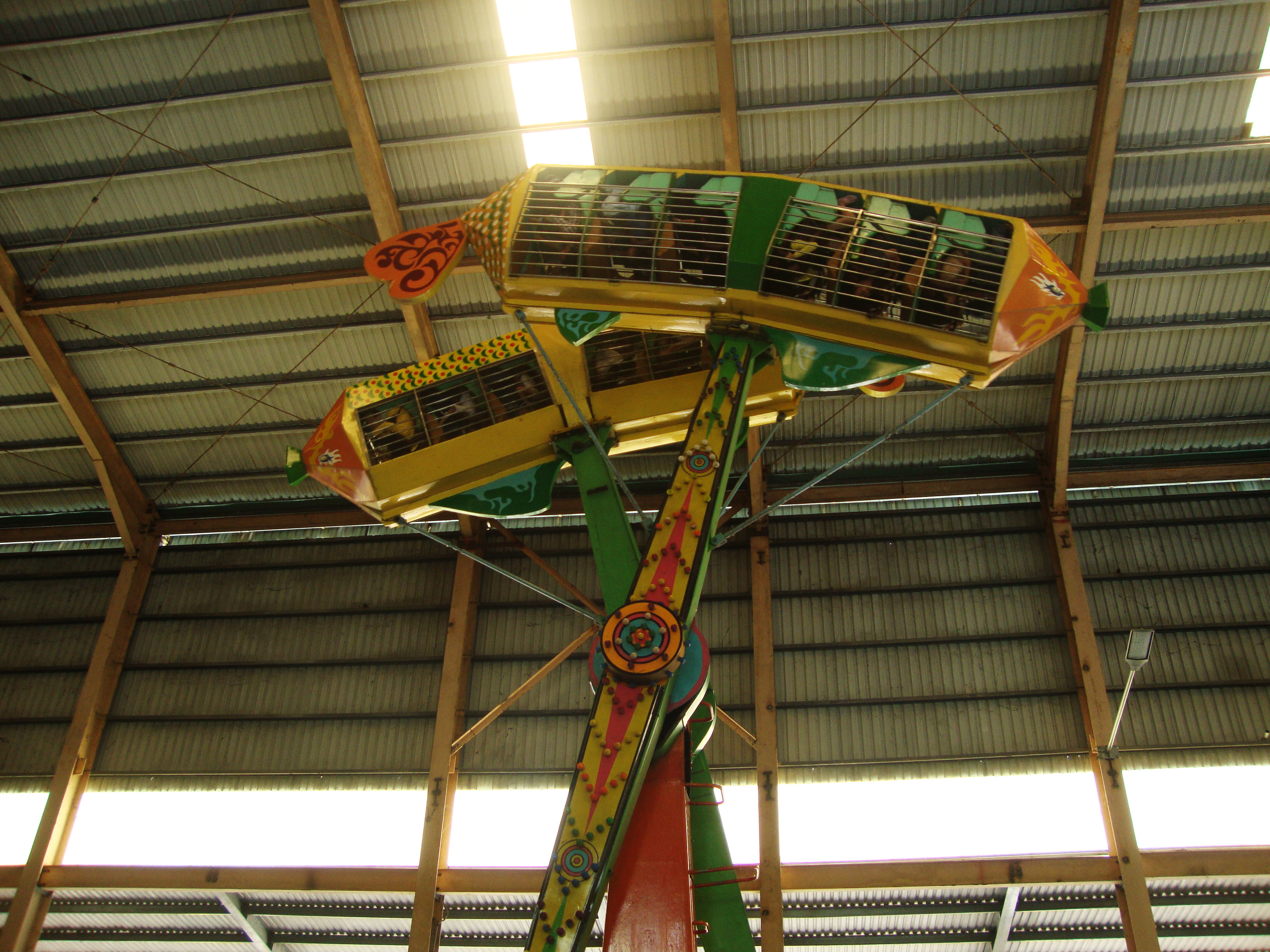
"Kamikaze" ride

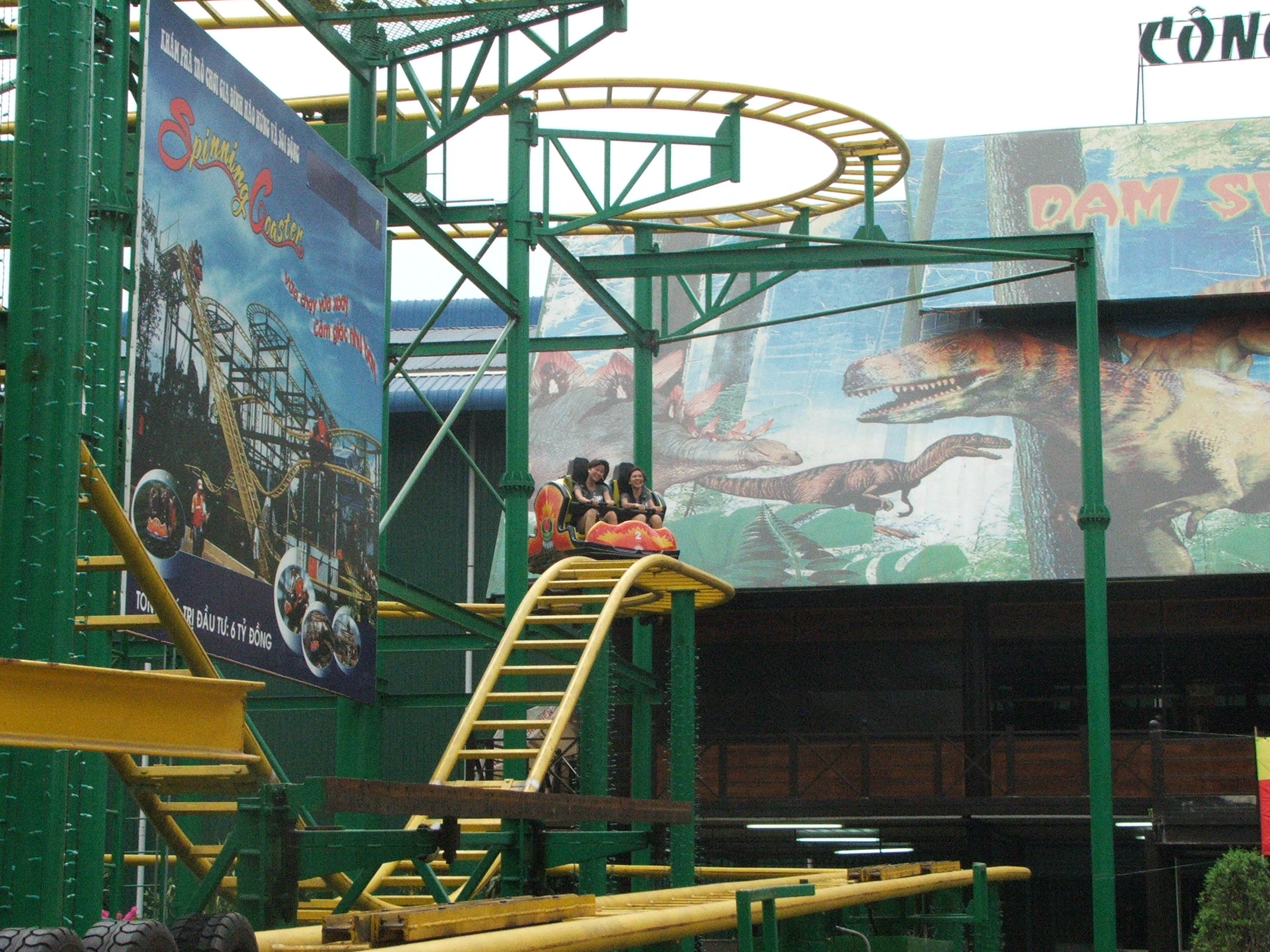

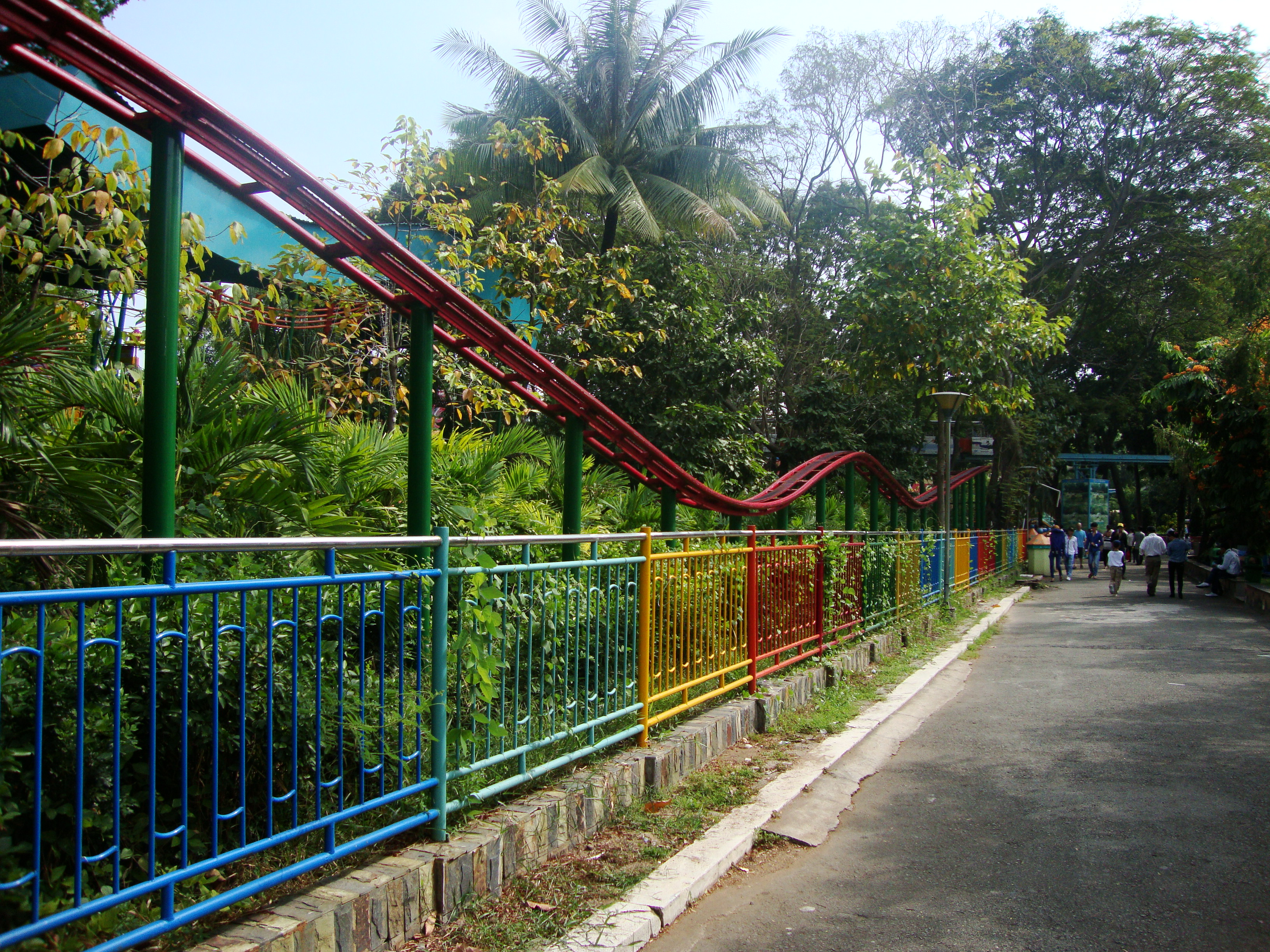

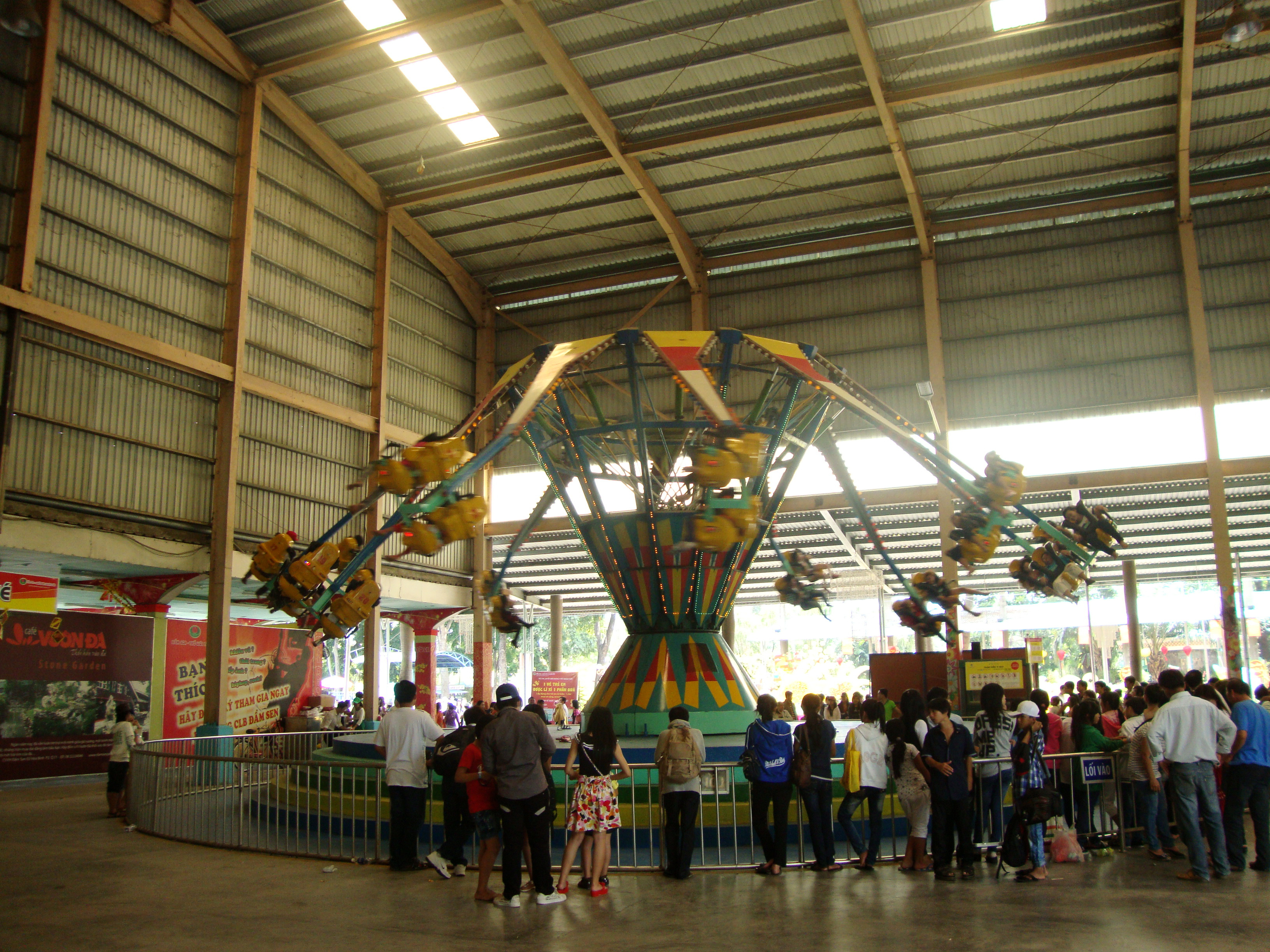
"Stellar Expedition"

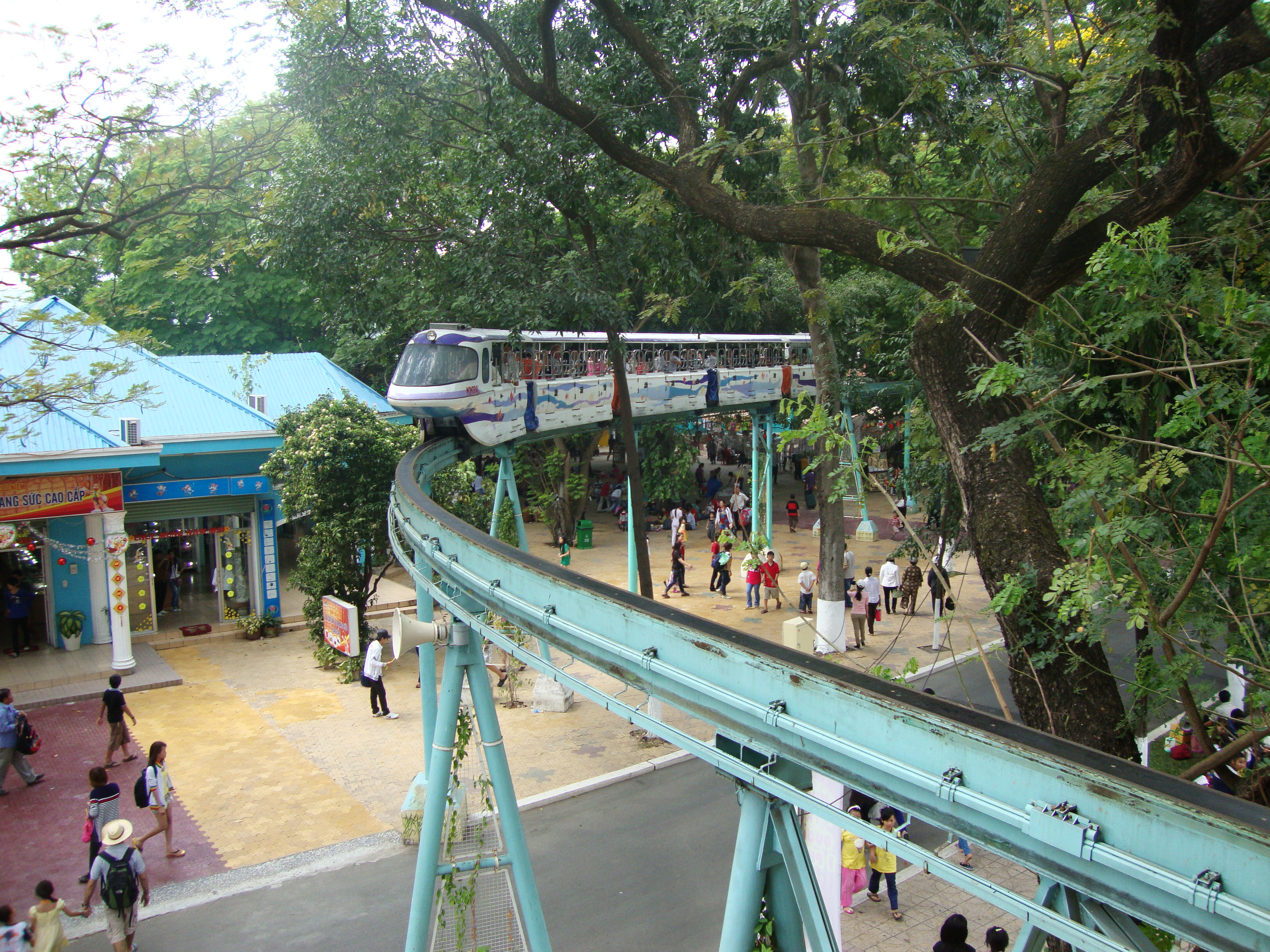
Monorail

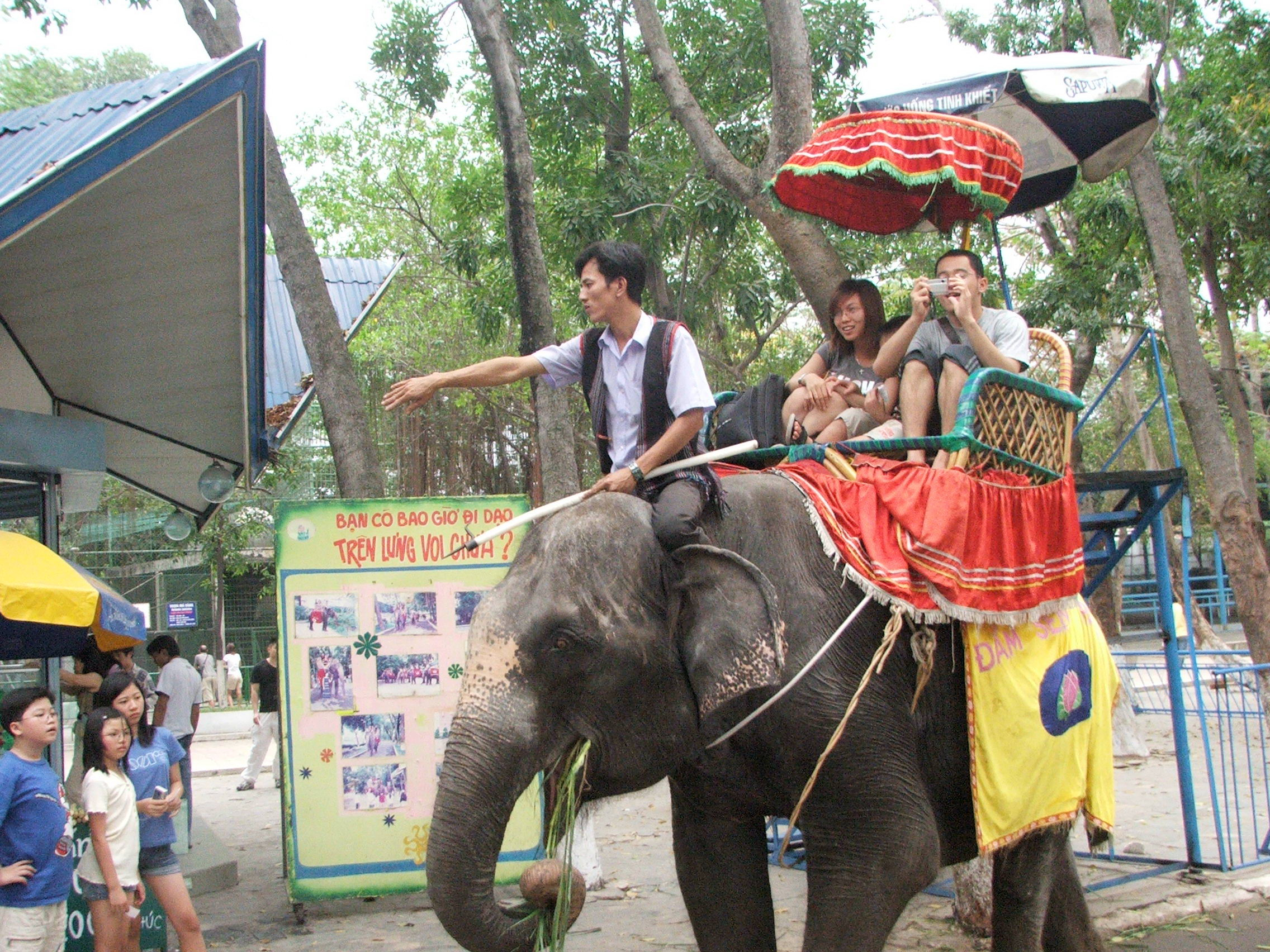

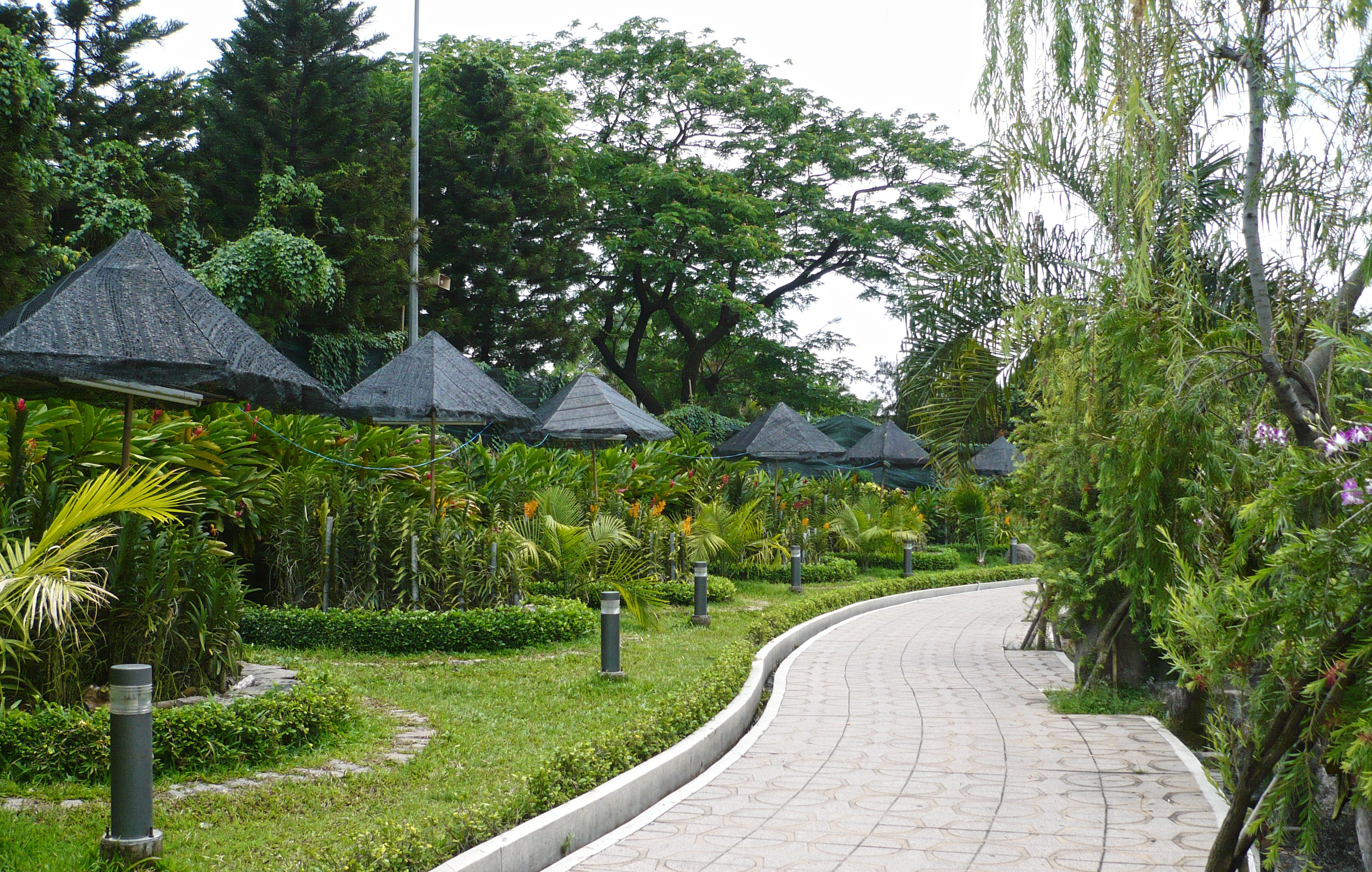

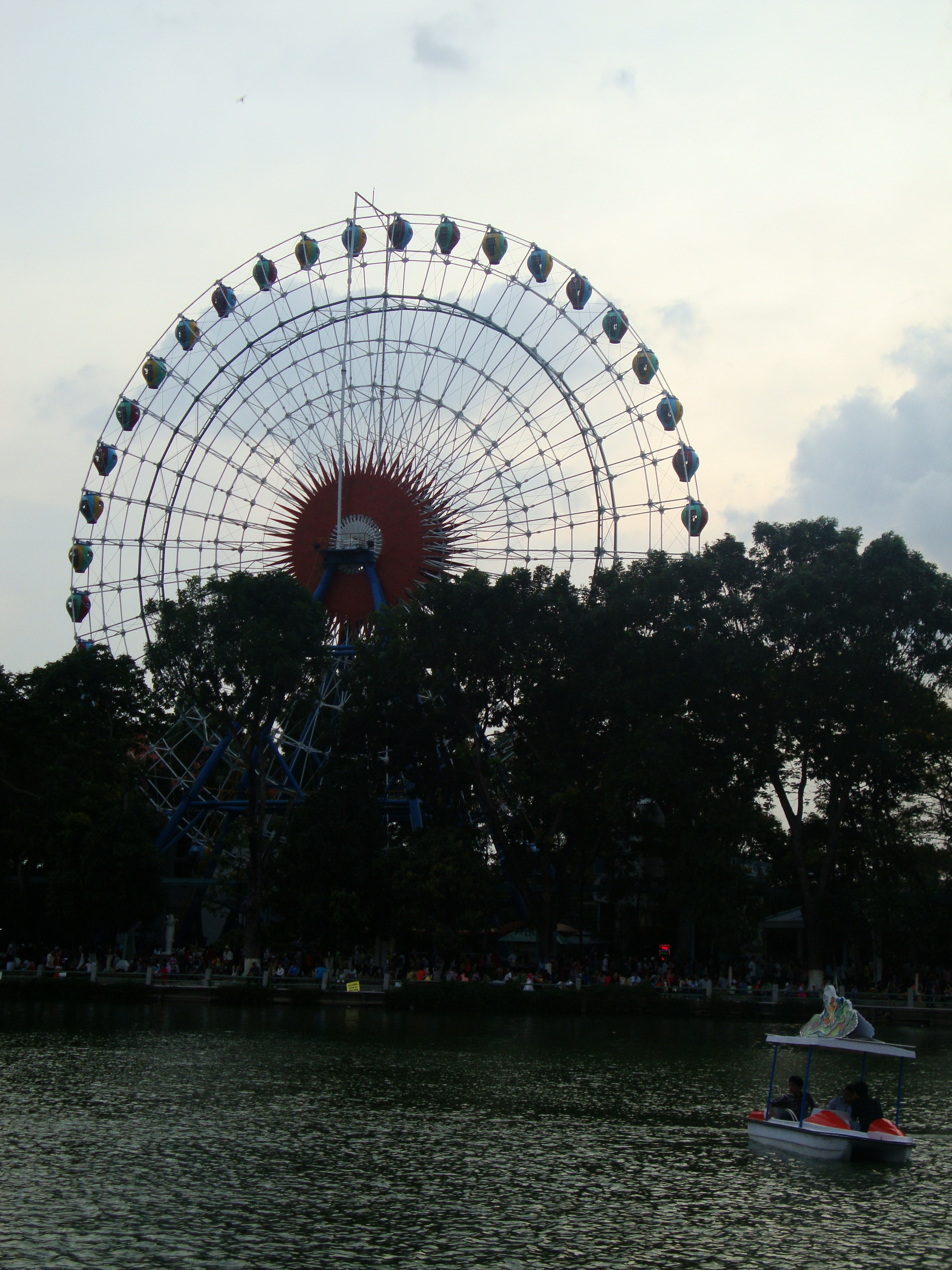
Ferris wheel

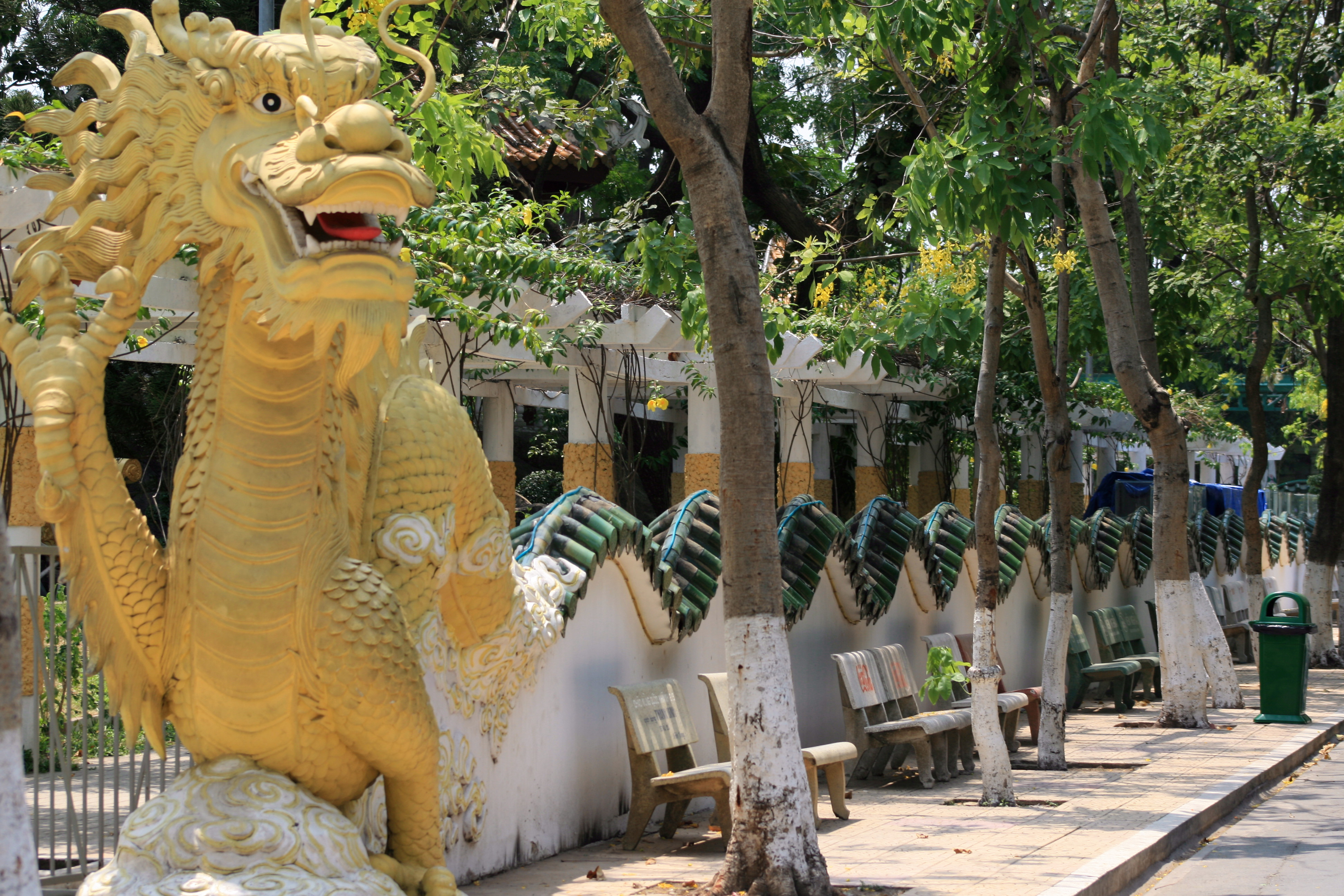
