= Perfume River =

River in Vietnam

Coordinates: 16°33′N 107°38′E

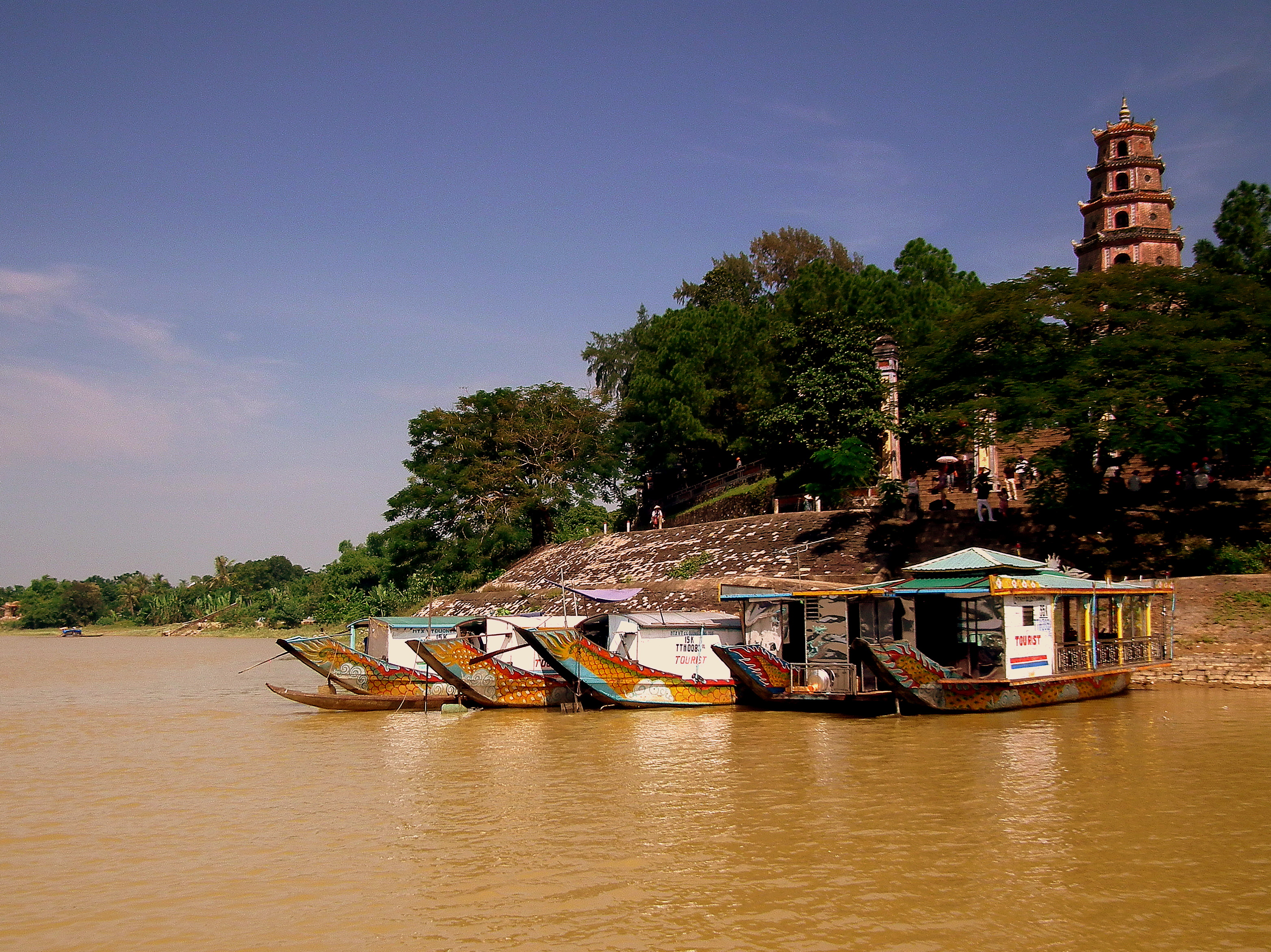
- The Perfume River at Thiên Mụ Temple in Huế
- Native name: Sông Hương (Vietnamese)

Location
- Country: Vietnam
- Province: Huế

Physical characteristics
- Source confluence: Bằng Lãng
- Length: 30 km (19 mi)

Basin features
- Tributaries
  - left: Tả Trạch
  - right: Hữu Trạch

The Perfume River (Vietnamese: Sông Hương or Hương Giang) is a river that crosses the city of Huế, in central Vietnam. In the autumn, flowers from orchards upriver from Huế fall into the water, giving the river a perfume-like aroma, hence the sobriquet.

== Source and flow ==
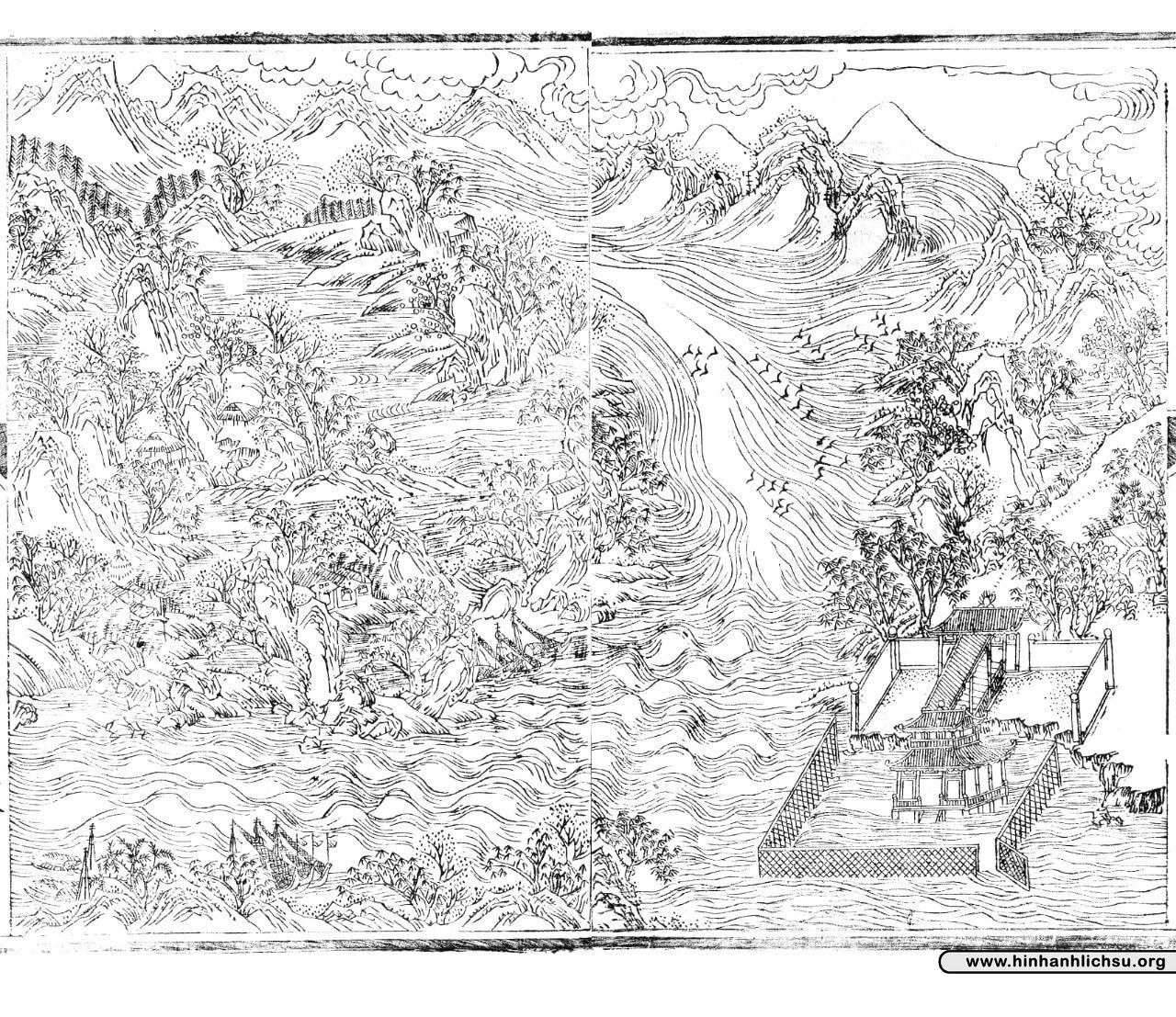
Upstream of the Perfume River in the Thần kinh thập nhị cảnh (神京二十景) set of landscape paintings painted in the 5th year of Thiệu Trị, 1845

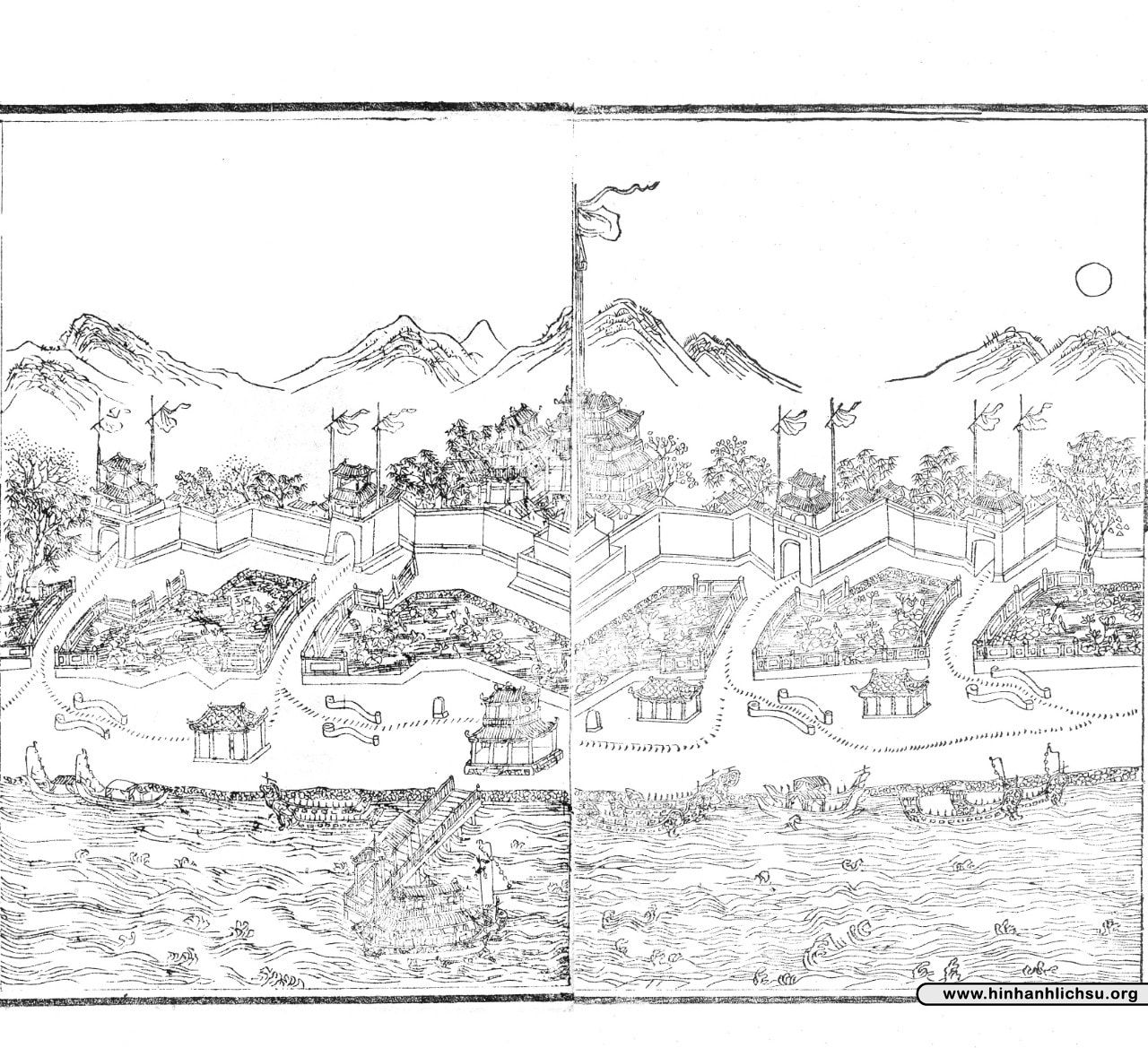
Perfume River in the Thần kinh thập nhị cảnh set of landscape paintings painted in the 5th year of Thiệu Trị, 1845

The Perfume River has two sources; both begin in the Dãy Trường Sơn mountain range and meet at Bằng Lãng Fork. The Tả Trạch (left tributary) originates in the Trường Đồng mountains and flows northwest towards the fork. The river then flows along south–north direction past the temples of Hòn Chén and Ngọc Trản, then flows north-west, meandering through the Nguyệt Biều and Luong Quan plains. Continuing on, the river flows northeast to Huế and passes the resting place of the Nguyễn emperors. The river continues, passing Hen islet and various villages, crossing the Sinh junction (capital of ancient Châu Hóa) before emptying into the Tam Giang lagoon.

From Bằng Lãng to the Thuan An estuary, the river is 30 km long and runs very slowly (as the river level is not much above sea level). The river darkens as it winds along the foot of Ngọc Trản mountain, where there is a deep abyss. The Perfume River basin has the highest rainfall in Vietnam.

== Surrounding area ==
The 105 m Mount Ngự Bình is strikingly symmetrical. On both sides of the Bang Son (Even Mount) are two small mounts, Ta Bat Son (left mount) and Huu Bat Son (right mount). After observing that Bang Son resembled a screen, the Nguyễn dynasty decided to build up Huế, which became known as their "Forbidden Purple City". Emperor Gia Long approved the design of geomancers, which chose this mount as a front altar of the imposing and solid defending wall system, and renamed it Ngự Bình.
