= Phú Vang =

- Commune
- Interactive map of Phú Vang
- Coordinates: 16.4403008979929°N 107.71521392318864°E
- Country: Vietnam
- Municipality: Huế
- Region: North Central Coast
- Established: 16 June 2025
- People's Committee headquarters: 26 Đỗ Tram, Hòa Tây Hamlet

Area
  - Total: 86.19 km^{2} (33.28 sq mi)

Population (2025)
  - Total: 39,250

Phú Vang is a commune of Huế, Vietnam.

== History ==
Phú Đa was formerly a commune of Phú Vang district. The administrative seat of Phú Vang District was moved from Phú Dương Commune to Phú Đa Commune in 2003.

On 30 May 2011, the Government issued Resolution No. 82/NQ-CP. Under the resolution, Phú Đa Township, the administrative seat of Phú Vang District, was established from the entire 2,966 ha of natural area and a population of 11,988 of Phú Đa Commune.

On 16 June 2025, the Standing Committee of the National Assembly of Vietnam issued Resolution No. 1675/NQ-UBTVQH15 on the reorganization of commune-level administrative units of Huế. Under the resolution, the entire natural area and population of Phú Đa Township, Phú Gia Commune, and Vinh Hà Commune, all formerly part of Phú Vang district, were reorganized to form a new commune named Phú Vang.
