= Phú Vang district =

Coordinates: 16.417°N 107.750°E

Phú Vang district Huyện Phú Vang
- District
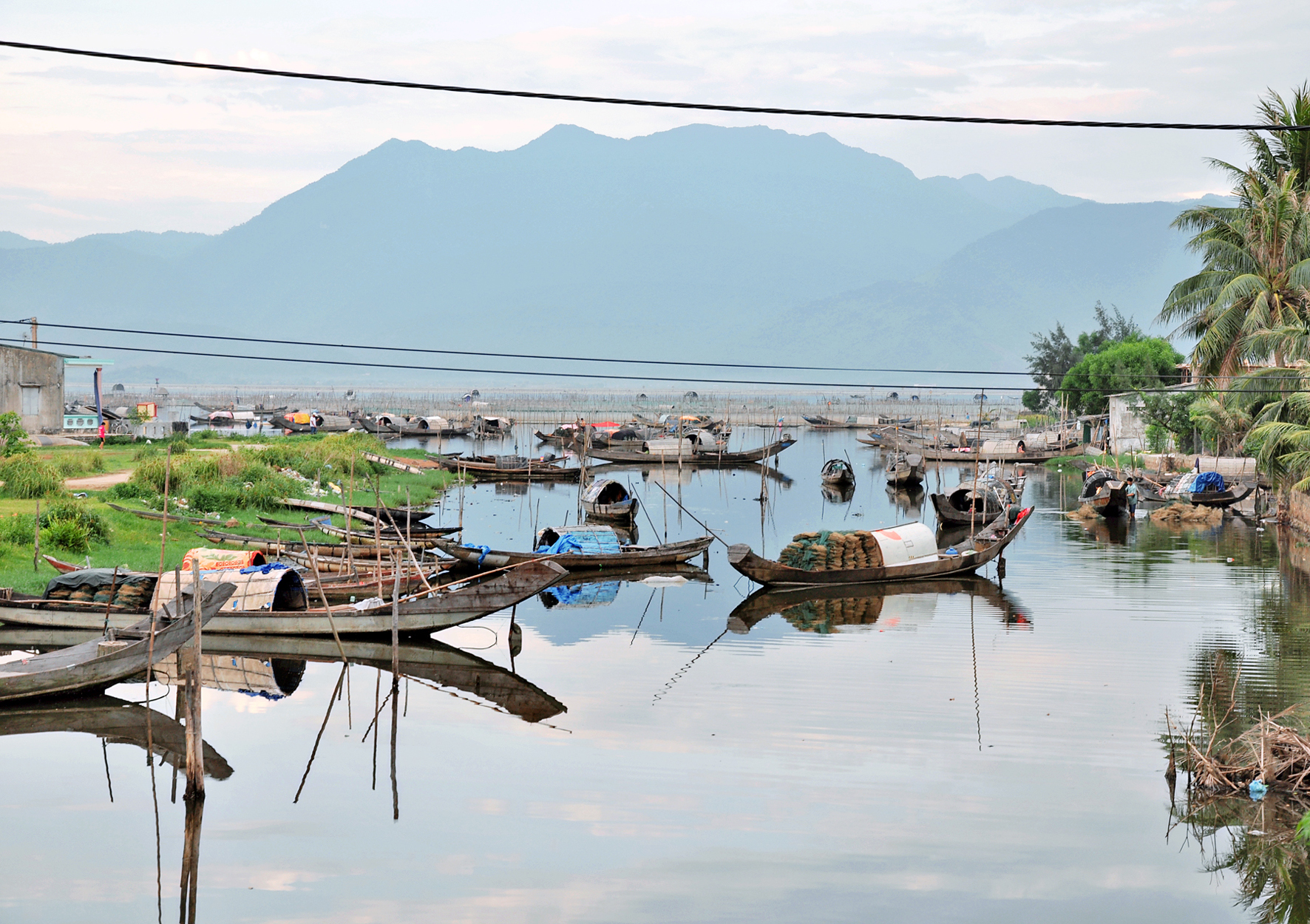
- View of Cau Hai lagoon
- Interactive map of Phú Vang district
- Country: Vietnam
- Region: North Central Coast
- Municipality: Huế
- Capital: Phú Đa

Area
  - Total: 90.85 sq mi (235.31 km^{2})

Population (2020)
  - Total: 137,962
- Time zone: UTC+7 (UTC + 7)

Phú Vang is a former rural district of Huế in the North Central Coast region of Vietnam. As of 2020 the district had a population of 137,962. The district covers an area of 235.31 km^{2} (90.85 sq mi). The district capital lies at Phú Đa.

== Geography ==
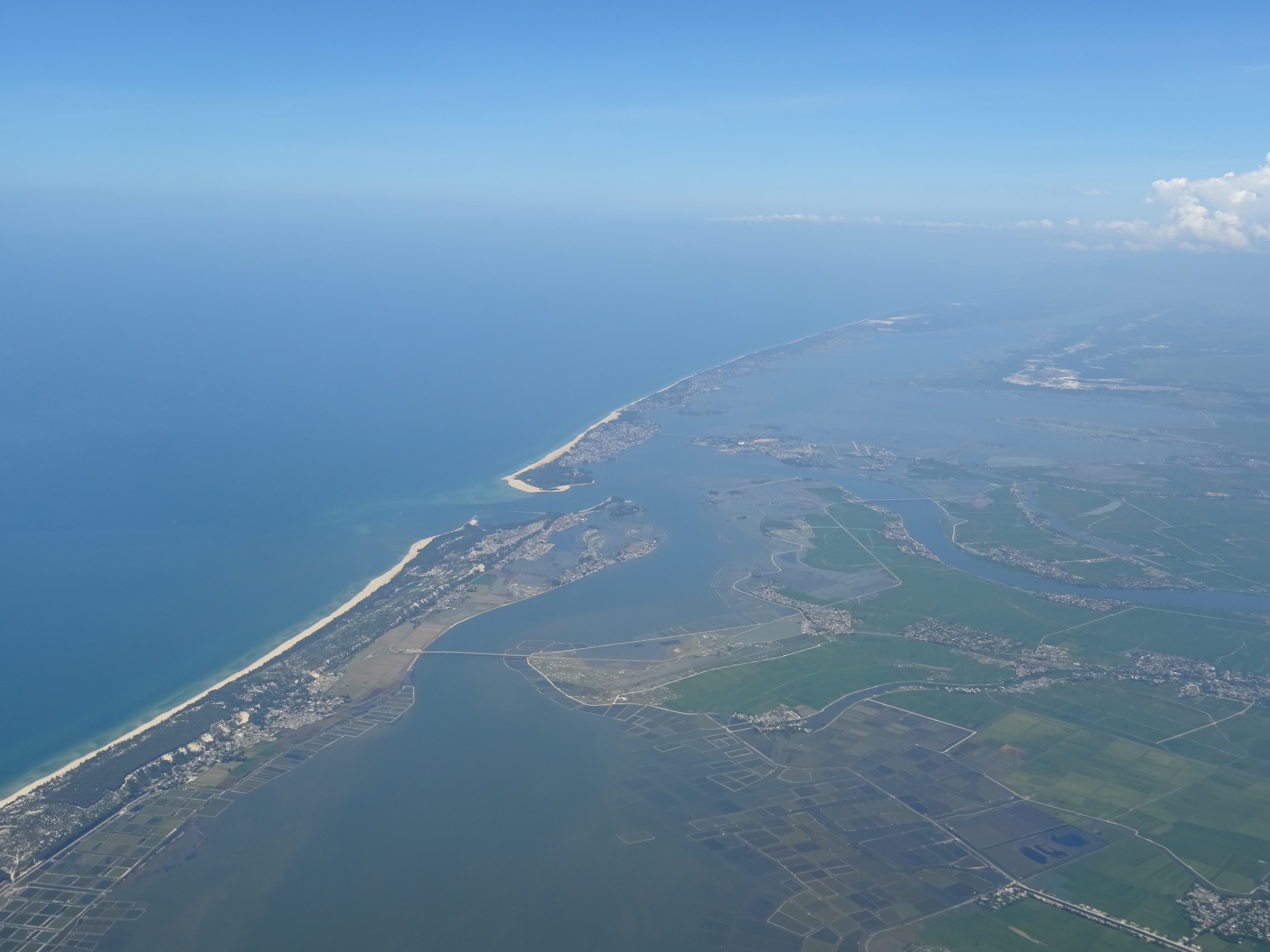
Tam Giang–Cau Hai lagoon

Phú Vang is located in Thừa Thiên Huế province, North Central Coast of Vietnam. It covers a total area of 235.31 square kilometres (90.85 sq mi). Phú Vang borders the district of Hương Thủy on the west, Phú Lộc district on the south, Huế to the north and the South China Sea on the east. Phú Vang has 35 kilometres (22 mi) long coastline and the area of the water surface is 6,000 hectares (15,000 acres). Phú Vang is home to many lagoons such as Tam Giang–Cau Hai lagoon.

Phú Vang belongs to the low-lying land with a large size of lagoons. Phú Vang is divided by two area which are rivers and sand dunes. Phú Vang is used for agricultural and aquaculture. Phú Vang has 42.3% of the total natural land area. Phú Vang is known to be home to titanium minerals. Thuận An is located in Phú Vang, it is one of the most important stragetics location.

== Administrative divisions ==
The district contains the township of Phú Đa and 13 communes:

- Phú Xuân
- Phú Mỹ
- Phú An
- Phú Hồ
- Phú Hải
- Phú Thuận
- Phú Diên
- Phú Lương
- Vinh Xuân
- Vinh Thanh
- Vinh An
- Phú Gia
- Vinh Hà
