= Thuận An estuary =

Port on the Hương River in Vietnam

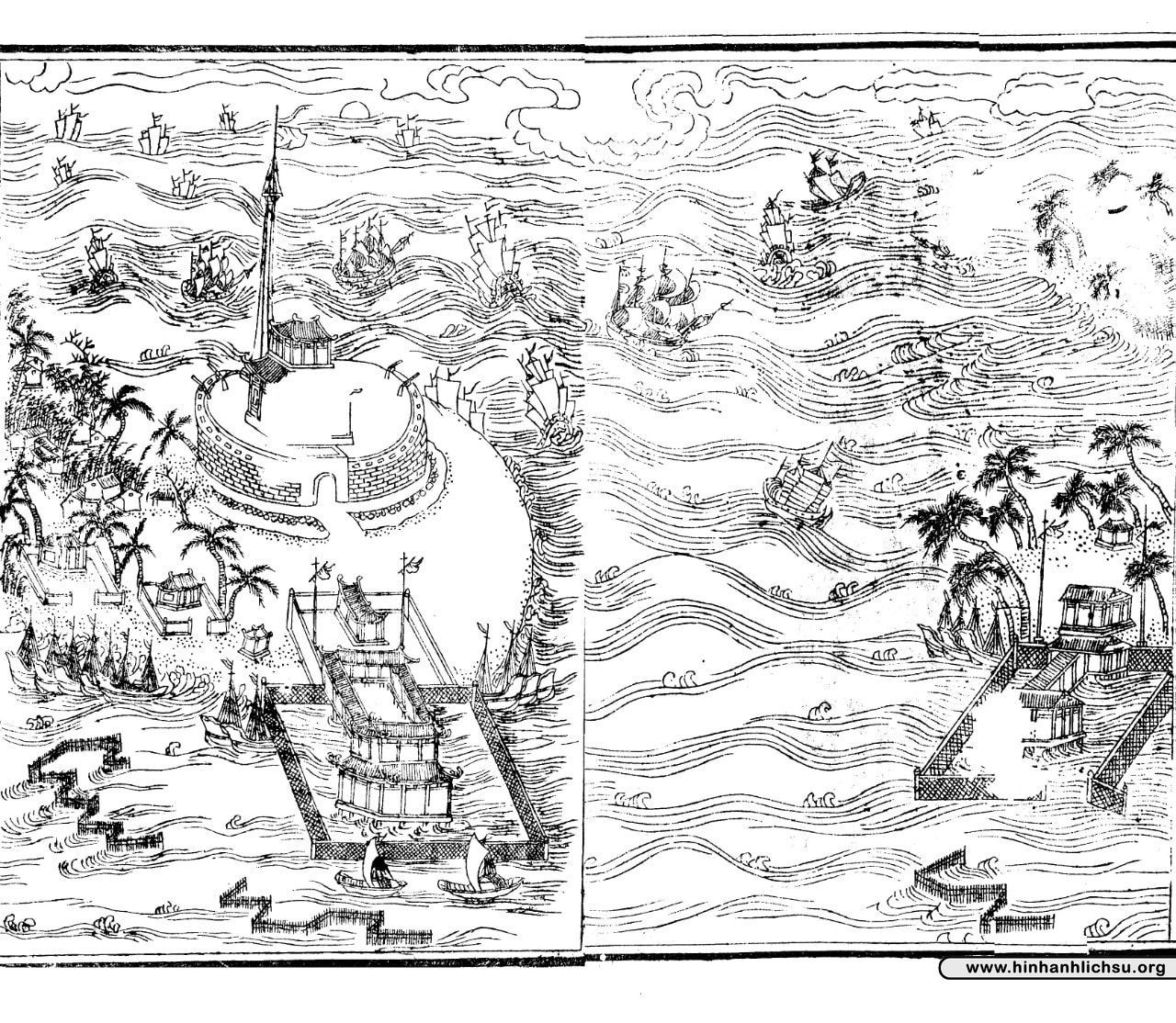
Thuận An estuary in the Thần kinh thập nhị cảnh (神京二十景) set of landscape paintings painted in the 5th year of Thiệu Trị, 1845

The Thuận An estuary (Vietnamese: cửa Thuận An, demotic names: cửa Eo, cửa Nộn), is an important estuarine port on the Hương River in central Vietnam's Huế.
