= Tam Giang–Cau Hai lagoon =

Coastal lagoon in Central Vietnam

- Hệ đầm phá Tam Giang – Cầu Hai (Vietnamese)
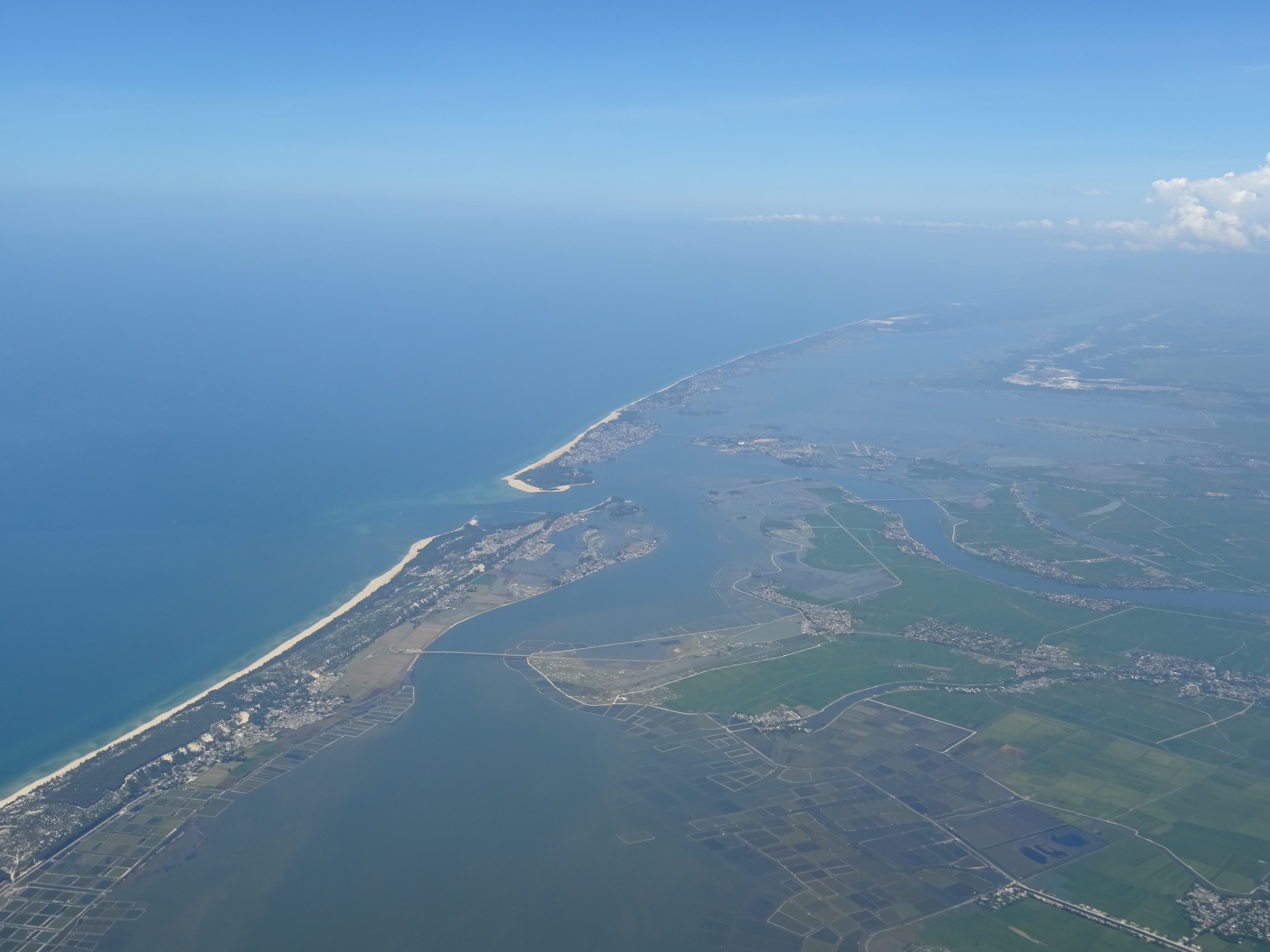
- Aerial photograph of the lagoon with Thuan An inlet
- Interactive map of Tam Giang–Cau Hai lagoon
- Location: Huế, Vietnam
- Coordinates: 16°33′36″N 107°37′54″E
- Max. length: 70 kilometres (43 mi)
- Surface area: 22,000 hectares (54,000 acres)
- Average depth: 1–3 metres (3 ft 3 in – 9 ft 10 in)
- Max. depth: 11 metres (36 ft)

The Tam Giang–Cau Hai lagoon (Vietnamese: Hệ đầm phá Tam Giang – Cầu Hai) is a coastal lagoon in Huế, Central Vietnam. It has an area of 22,000 hectares of water surface and stretches nearly 70 kilometres, making it the largest lagoon system in Southeast Asia.

The lagoon system comprises several smaller lagoons, namely: Tam Giang, Thanh Lam, Sam Chuon, Ha Trung, Thuy Tu and Cau Hai. It has two inlets connecting to the South Vietnam Sea: Thuan An (in the centre) and Tu Hien (in the south). The depth of the lagoon is generally 1–3 metres, with the deepest site close to Thuan An inlet up to 11 metres.
