= Bình Thới =

Bình Thới Phường Bình Thới
- Ward
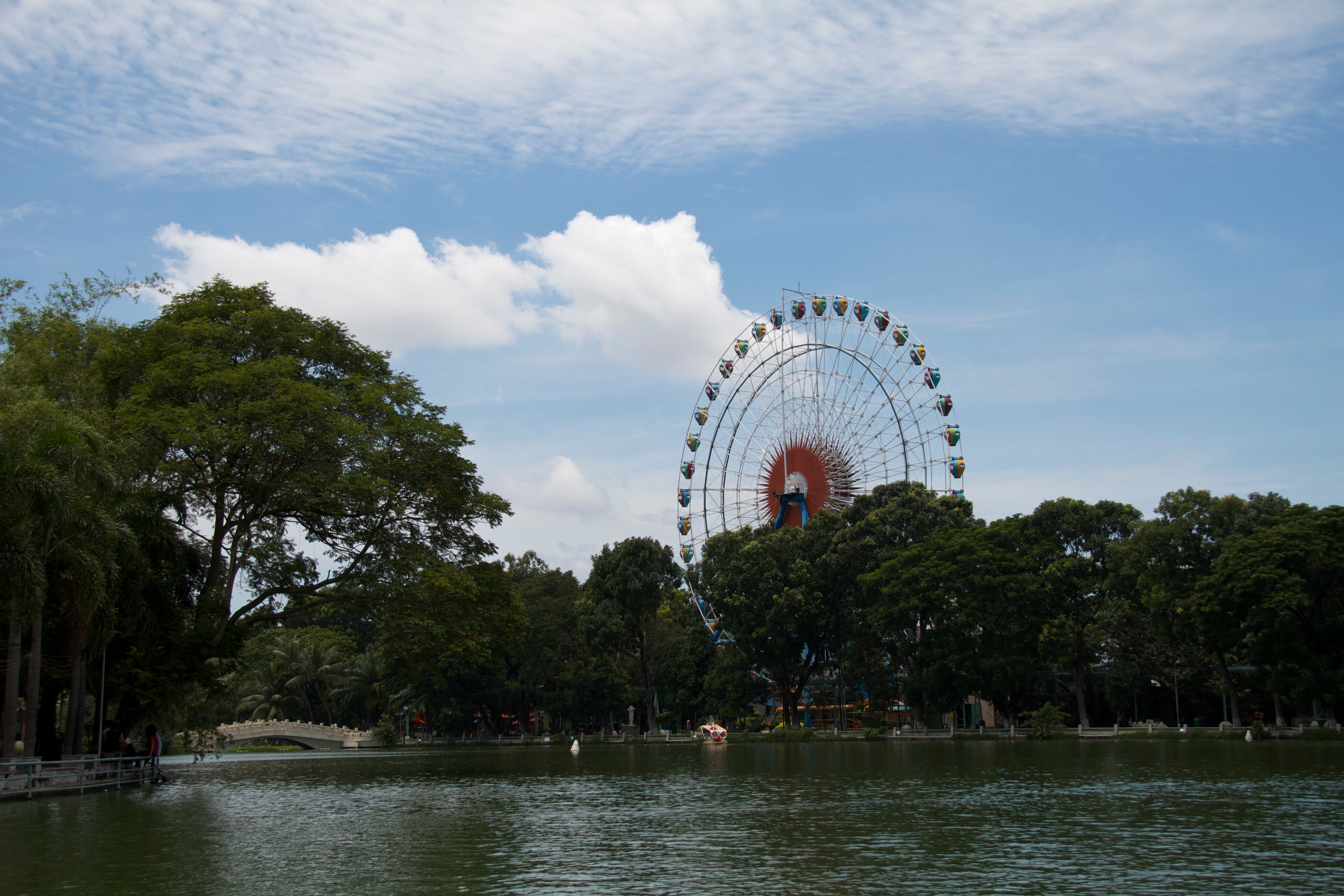
- Đầm Sen Park
- Interactive map of Bình Thới
- Coordinates: 10°45′44″N 106°38′34″E
- Country: Vietnam
- Municipality: Ho Chi Minh City
- Established: June 16, 2025

Area
  - Total: 0.59 sq mi (1.52 km^{2})

Population (2024)
  - Total: 76,478
  - Density: 130,000/sq mi (50,300/km^{2})
- Time zone: UTC+07:00 (Indochina Time)
- Administrative code: 27232

Bình Thới (Vietnamese: Phường Bình Thới) is a ward of Ho Chi Minh City, Vietnam. It is one of the 168 new wards, communes and special zones of the city following the reorganization in 2025.

== History ==
On June 16, 2025, the National Assembly Standing Committee issued Resolution No. 1685/NQ-UBTVQH15 on the arrangement of commune-level administrative units of Ho Chi Minh City in 2025 (effective from June 16, 2025). Accordingly, the entire land area and population of Ward 3, Ward 10 and part of Ward 8 of the former District 11 will be integrated into a new ward named Bình Thới (Clause 29, Article 1).
