= Trà Vinh, Vĩnh Long =

Trà Vinh
- Ward
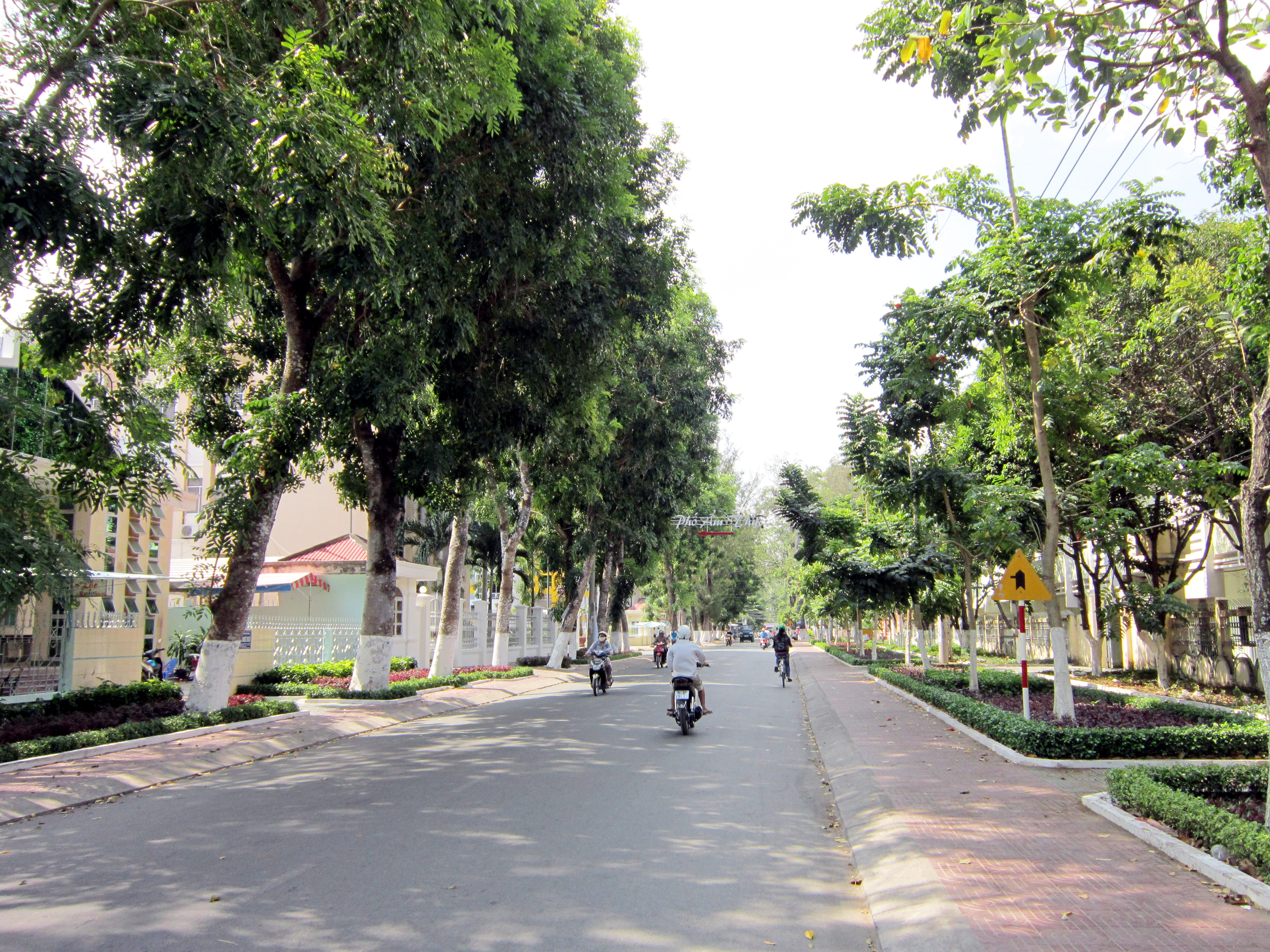
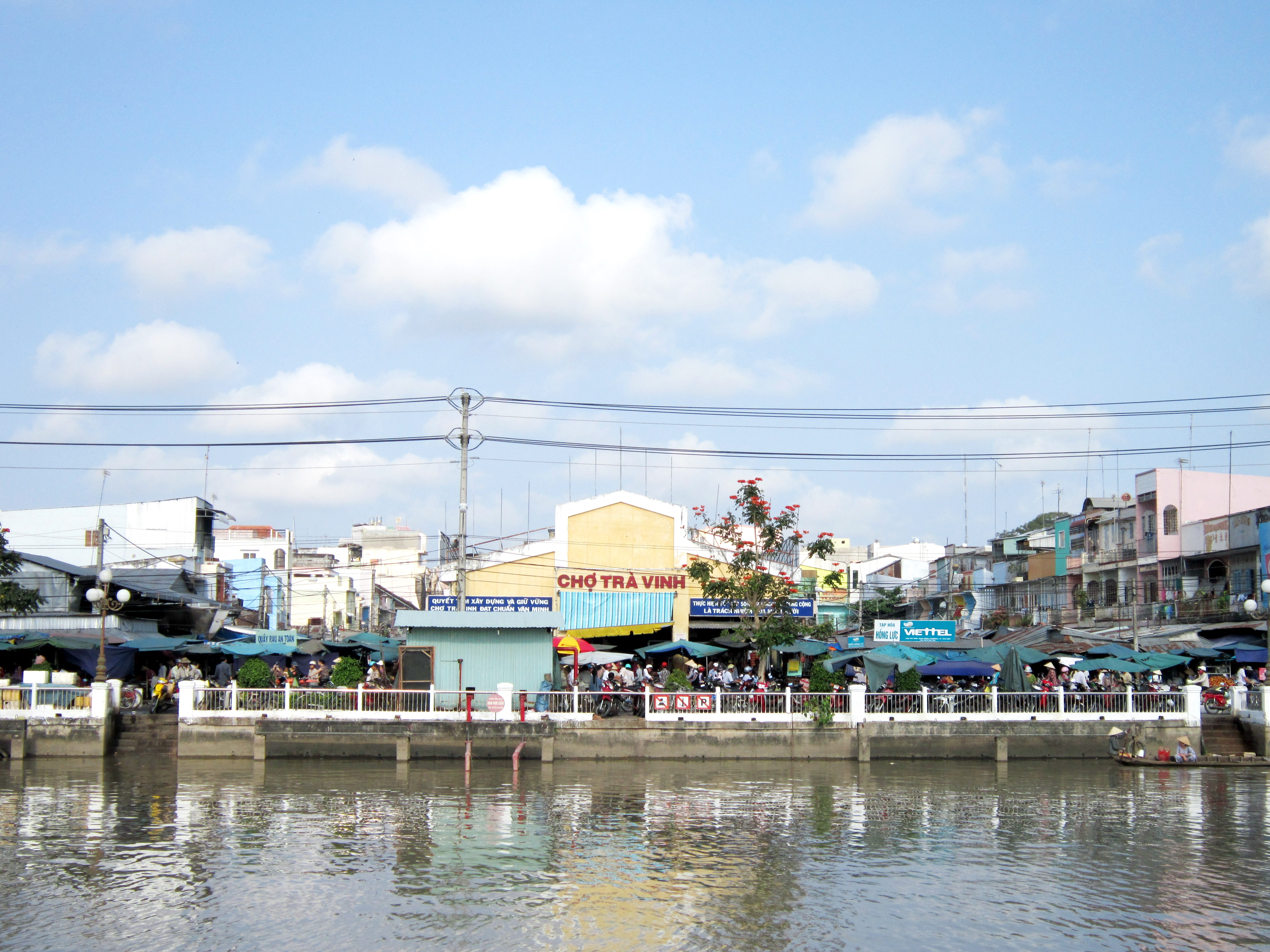
- From top to bottom: Phạm Ngũ Lão Street, Trà Vinh Market

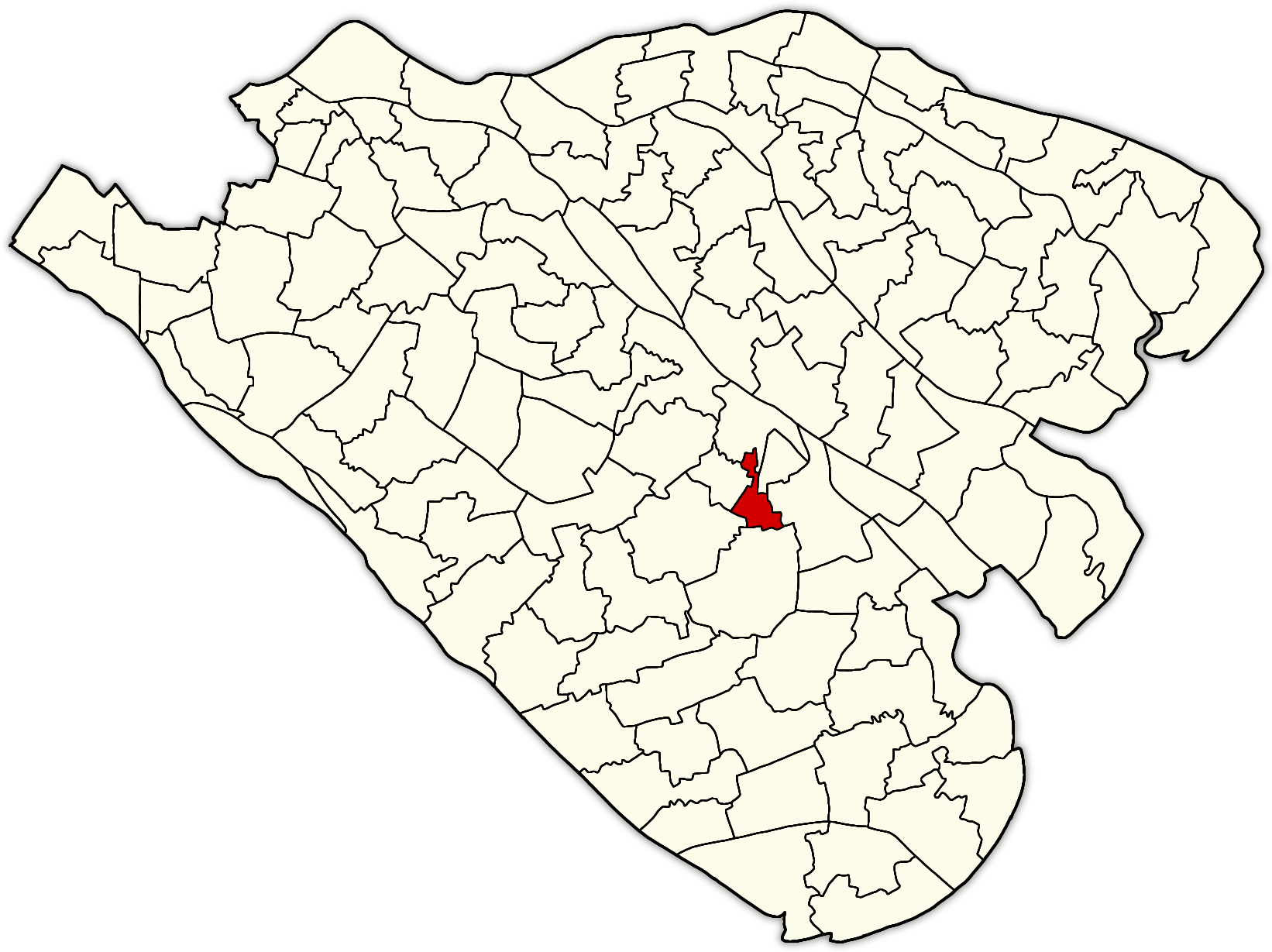
- Location of Trà Vinh ward
- Country: Vietnam
- Province: Vĩnh Long
- Establish: June 16, 2025
- People's Committee: 09, Lê Thánh Tôn street, Trà Vinh ward.

Area
  - Total: 15.73 km^{2} (6.07 sq mi)

Population 2025
  - Total: 43,397 people
  - Density: 2,759/km^{2} (7,145/sq mi)
- Time zone: UTC+07:00

Trà Vinh is a ward in Vĩnh Long province. It is one of 124 communes and wards in the province after the 2025 reorganization.

== Geography ==
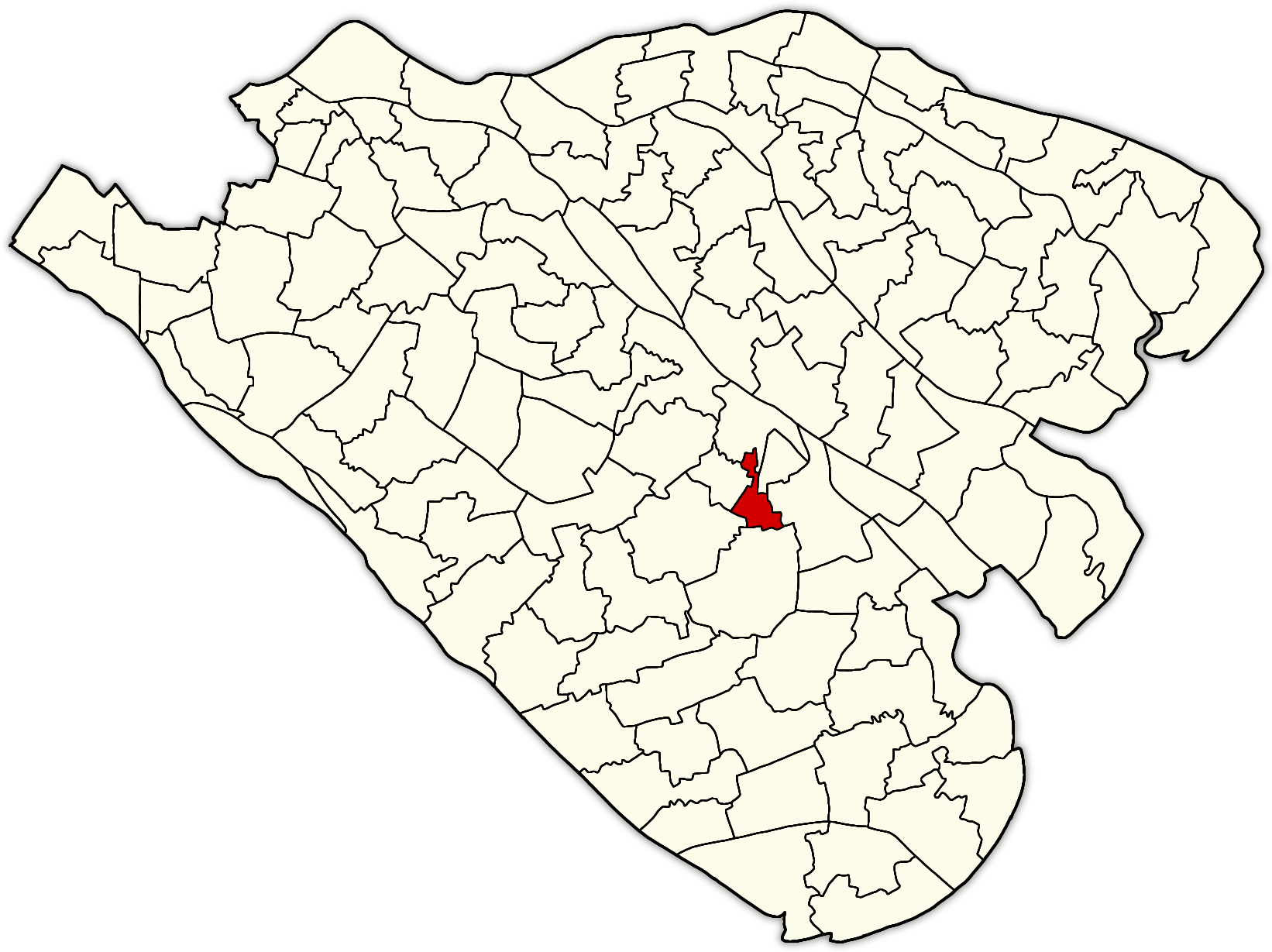
Location of Trà Vinh ward on Vĩnh Long province map (highlight in red).

Trà Vinh ward has a geographical location:

- To the north, it borders Long Đức ward.
- To the west, it borders Nguyệt Hóa ward.
- To the south, it borders Song Lộc commune and Châu Thành commune.
- To the east, it borders Hưng Mỹ commune and Hòa Thuận ward.

== History ==
Prior to 2025, Trà Vinh ward was formerly wards 1, 3, and 9 of Trà Vinh provincial city, Trà Vinh province.

On June 12, 2025, the National Assembly of Vietnam issued Resolution No. 202/2025/QH15 on the reorganization of provincial-level administrative units. Accordingly:

- Vĩnh Long province was established by merging the entire area and population of the provinces of Bến Tre province, Vĩnh Long province, and Trà Vinh province.

On June 16, 2025, the Standing Committee of the National Assembly of Vietnam issued Resolution No. 1687/NQ-UBTVQH15 on the reorganization of commune-level administrative units in Vĩnh Long province. Accordingly:

- Trà Vinh ward was established by merging the entire area and population of wards 1, 3, and 9 (formerly part of Trà Vinh provincial city).
