= Dong Cheng =

Dong Cheng may refer to:

- Dong Cheng (Han dynasty) (died 200), general of the Chinese Han dynasty
- Dong Cheng (boxer) (born 1986), Chinese female boxer

== See also ==
- Dongcheng (disambiguation)
