= Bình Minh =

Coordinates: 10.133°N 105.833°E

- District-level town (Class-4)
- Bình Minh district-level town Thị xã Bình Minh
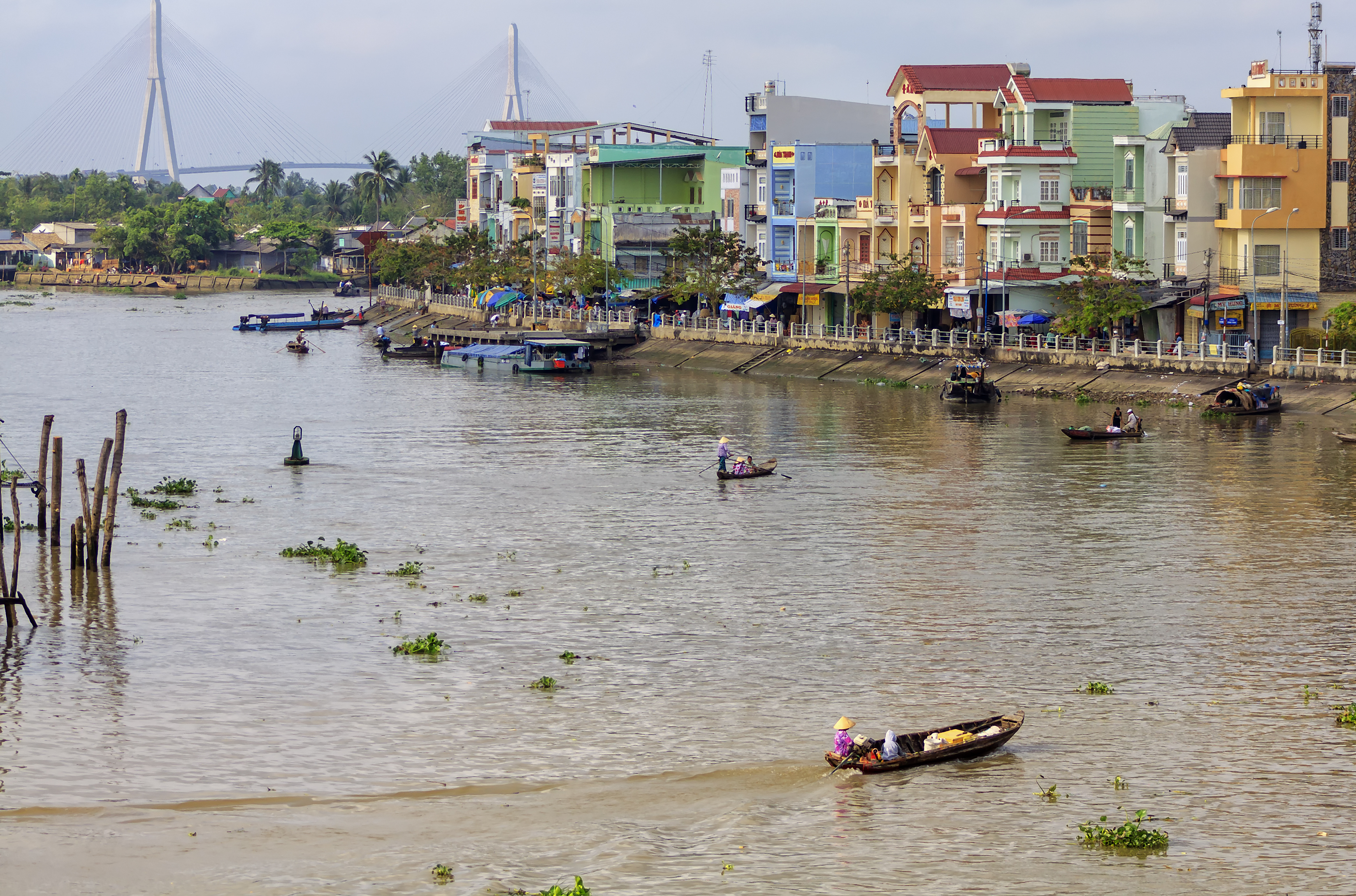
- Binh Minh Administrative Center
- Interactive map of Bình Minh
- Country: Vietnam
- Region: Mekong Delta
- Province: Vĩnh Long

Area
  - District-level town (Class-4): 36.15 sq mi (93.62 km^{2})
  - Urban: 3.5548 sq mi (9.2068 km^{2})

Population (2013)
  - District-level town (Class-4): 95,282
  - Density: 2,640/sq mi (1,018/km^{2})
  - Urban: 40,807
  - Urban density: 11,479/sq mi (4,432.2/km^{2})
- Time zone: UTC+7 (UTC + 7)

Bình Minh is a former district-level town of Vĩnh Long province, in the Mekong Delta region of Vietnam. Under the decree No 89/NQ-CP dated Dec 28, 2012, the cabinet of Vietnam SR decided to upgrade Bình Minh of Vĩnh Long to town from rural district. Today part of Bình Minh ward, Cái Vồn ward, Đông Thành ward belonging to Vĩnh Long province after 2025 reorganization in Vietnam.

The area of Bình Minh is 93.62 km^{2} with 95,282 inhabitants, 2013 census.

As of 2003 the district had a population of 177,275. The district covers an area of 244 km^{2}. The district capital lies at Cái Vồn.

== Geography ==
Bình Minh town lies to the south-west of Vĩnh Long province. It shares the border with: Bình Tân district to the north. Trà Ôn district and Cần Thơ City to the south. Bình Tân district and Cần Thơ City to the west. Tam Bình district to the east

== The land of pomelos - a plan in the future ==
Binh Minh is famous for pomelos. It is located in the south of Hậu Giang river and is bordered upon Cần Thơ city by this river. In this convenient position, the land of pomelos has developed its economy rapidly, especially in recent years. The completion the Cần Thơ Bridge triggered the development of the town. Bình Minh hospital is one of the five constructions built to answer to Millennial Anniversary of Hanoi, it was completed and was used since then. The Central Administration Building has built that is designed and is constructed by Hà Đô Group with architectural way of modern somewhat ancient. Ngô Quyền street, which has a length without one kilometer but it contains park, the State Treasury, the Tax Department, post office, primary school, under economics house, district unit head, three banks and a part of market. In 2012s, it is exact become type four city. Bình Minh, the land of pomelos will become the land of investment.

== Commune-level subdivisions ==
The town of Binh Minh consists of three wards and five communes.

The three new wards comprise former Cai Von town and some lands from Thuận An and Dong Binh communes.

Wards:

- Cái Vồn
- Thành Phước
- Đông Thuận

Communes:

- Thuận An
- Mỹ Hòa
- Đông Bình
- Đông Thạnh
- Đông Thành

== History ==
Bình Minh was formerly a district of Vĩnh Long under the control of Republic of Vietnam. Its headquarters was located in Mỹ Thuận commune. During the 1975 Spring Offensive, the ARVN 21st division soldiers defended strictly at the ferry crossing between Can Tho-Binh Minh, VL Province. After Saigon government collapsed, Bình Minh became one of 10 districts of the newly established province Cửu Long in February 1976.

According to the decree 59/CP on 3 March 1977, the government decided to merge Bình Minh and Tam Bình into a new district named Tam Bình. In fact, Bình Minh and Tam Bình was two independent ones without any changes.

On 29 September 1981, Ministerial Council re-established Bình Minh district from the former part. Bình Minh comprised Cái Vồn town and 6 communes such as: Tân Quới, Tân Lược, Thành Lợi, Mỹ Thuận, Mỹ Hòa, Đông Thành.

Under the decree no 86-HĐBT dated 27 March 1985, Mỹ Thuận commune was split into 3 new communes: Mỹ Thuận commune, Nguyễn Văn Thảnh commune and Thuận An commune under control of Bình Minh district, Cửu Long province.

Since 1991, Bình Minh district has been one of 6 districts of the newly reestablished province, Vĩnh Long.

On 9 August 1994, government issued the decree no 85/CP to split Đông Thành commune into Đông Thành, Đông Bình and Đông Thạnh commune; Thành Lợi commune into Thành Lợi, Thành Đông and Thành Trung commune; Tân Quới commune into Tân Quới, Tân Bình, Tân Thành commune; Tân Lược into Tân Quới, Tân An Thạnh, Tân Hưng commune.

On 31 July 2007, government split the district into 2 districts named respectively Bình Minh and Bình Tân (New Bình Minh).

Bình Minh comprised Cái Vồn town and 5 communes: Thuận An, Mỹ Hòa, Đông Bình, Đông Thành, Đông Thạnh. Bình Tân comprised 11 communes: Mỹ Thuận, Nguyễn Văn Thảnh, Thành Lợi, Thành Đông, Thành Trung, Tân Quới, Tân Thành, Tân Bình, Tân Lược, Tân An Thạnh and Tân Hưng.

On 17 September 2010, Ministry of Construction upgraded Cái Vồn town into the fourth-level town.

On 28 December 2012, Government upgraded Bình Minh district into Bình Minh town with 3 wards and 5 communes.

== Historical monuments ==
- Mỹ Thuận temple
- Long An pagoda
- Đông Phước old pagoda
- Bà pagoda (Chinese community)
- Bửu Hưng pagoda

== Gallery ==
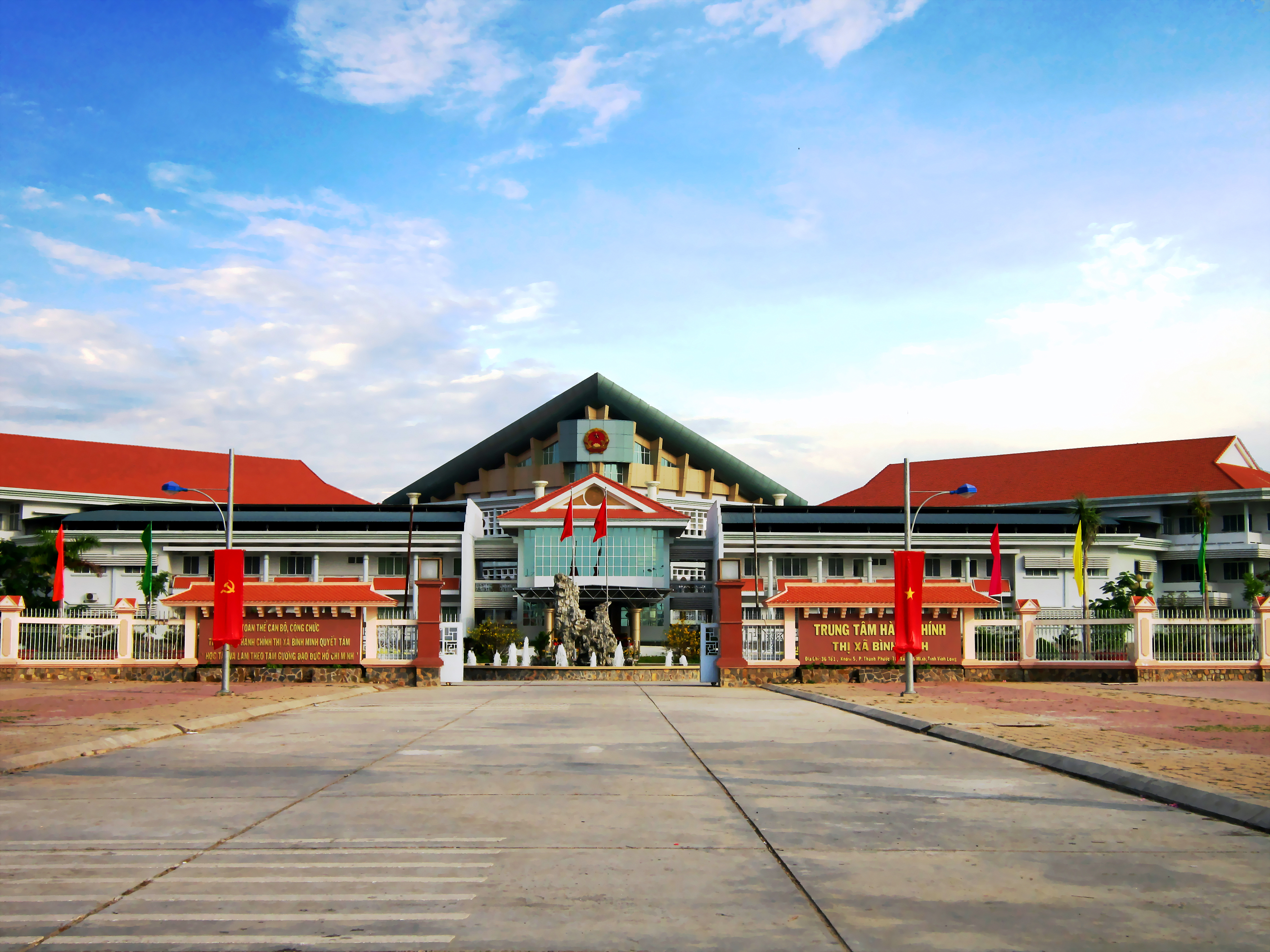
Riverfront house in the center of Bình Minh town

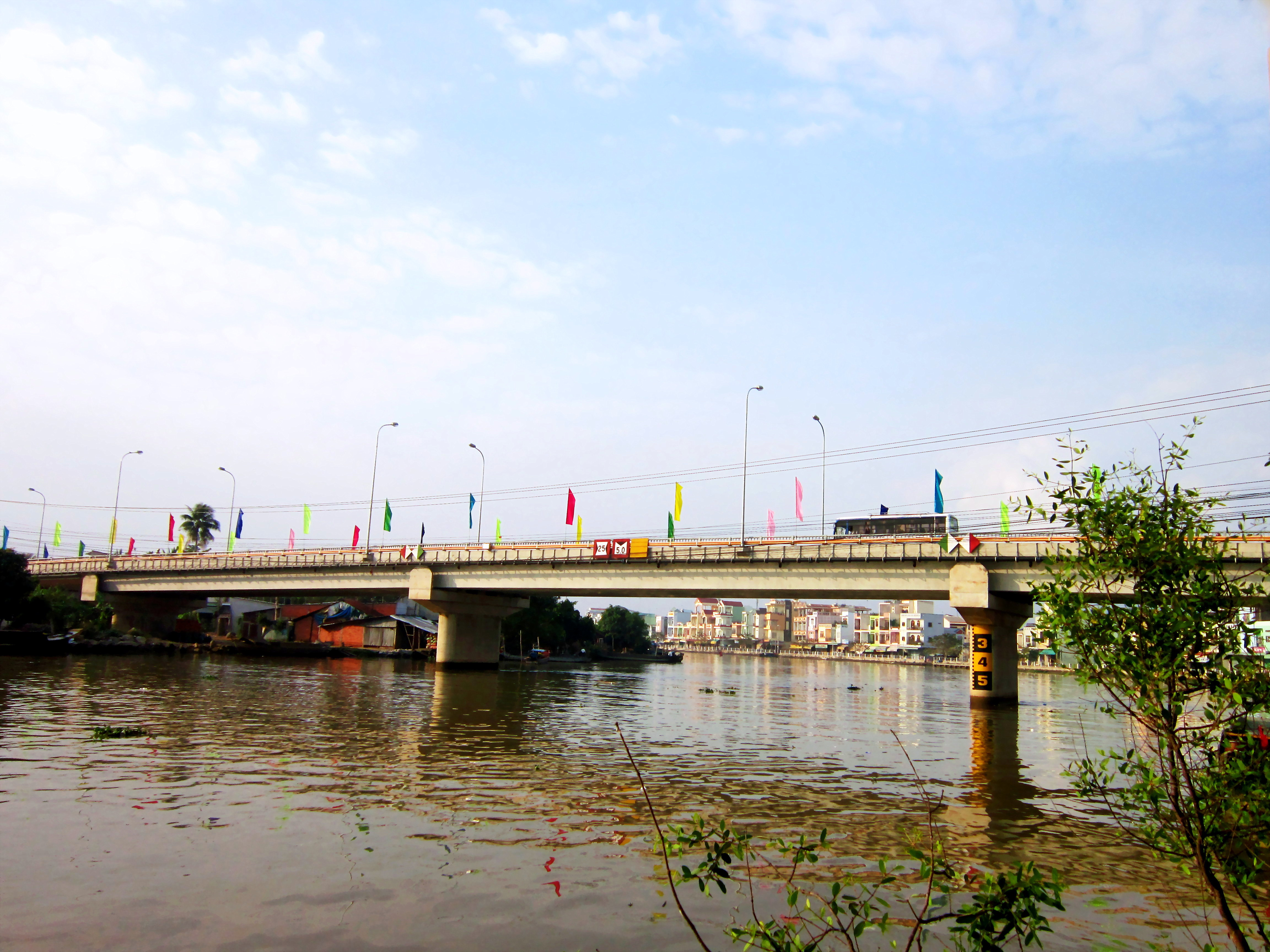
Cái Vồn Nhỏ Bridge connects Cái Vồn ward and Đông Thuận ward in Bình Minh town.
