= Dongcheng =

Dongcheng (generally simplified Chinese: 东城; traditional Chinese: 東城; pinyin: Dōngchéng; lit. 'East City') may refer to the following locations in China:

== Districts ==
- Dongcheng District, Beijing
- Dongcheng District, Dongguan, Guangdong

== Towns ==
- Dongcheng, Yangjiang, subdivision of Yangdong District, Yangjiang, Guangdong
- Dongcheng, Hebei, subdivision of Yangyuan County, Hebei
- Dongcheng, Wangcheng, a former town of Wangcheng District, Changsha, Hunan, now merged with the town of Chating on 19 November 2015; presently it is a community (社区) of Wangcheng.
- Dongcheng, Helong, subdivision of Helong, Jilin
- Dongcheng, Mori County, in Mori Kazakh Autonomous County, Xinjiang
- Dongcheng, Linhai (东塍镇), subdivision of Linhai, Zhejiang

== Townships ==
- Dongcheng Township, Ji County, Shanxi

== Subdistricts ==
=== Anhui ===
- Dongcheng Subdistrict, Jieshou, in Jieshou City

=== Chongqing ===
- Dongcheng Subdistrict, Nanchuan District, in Nanchuan District
- Dongcheng Subdistrict, Tongliang District, in Tongliang District

=== Guangdong ===
- Dongcheng Subdistrict, Qingyuan, in Qingcheng District, Qingyuan
- Dongcheng Subdistrict, Sihui, in Sihui City

=== Fujian ===
- Dongcheng Subdistrict, Longyan, in Xinluo District, Longyan

=== Henan ===
- Dongcheng Subdistrict, Jia County, Henan, in Jia County
- Dongcheng Subdistrict, Shangshui County, in Shangshui County
- Dongcheng Subdistrict, Shenqiu County, in Shenqiu County

=== Hubei ===
- Dongcheng Subdistrict, Jingzhou, in Jingzhou District, Jingzhou
- Dongcheng Subdistrict, Lichuan, Hubei, in Lichuan City
- Dongcheng Subdistrict, Suizhou, in Zengdu District, Suizhou

=== Inner Mongolia ===
- Dongcheng Subdistrict, Chifeng, in Hongshan District
- Dongcheng Subdistrict, Erenhot, in Erenhot City

=== Jilin ===
- Dongcheng Subdistrict, Jilin City, in Longtan District, Jilin City

=== Liaoning ===
- Dongcheng Subdistrict, Gaizhou, in Gaizhou City
- Dongcheng Subdistrict, Lingyuan, in Lingyuan City
- Dongcheng Subdistrict, Xinmin, in Xinmin City

=== Shaanxi ===
- Dongcheng Subdistrict, Xingping, in Xingping City

=== Shandong ===
- Dongcheng Subdistrict, Dongying, in Dongying District, Dongying
- Dongcheng Subdistrict, Heze, in Mudan District, Heze
- Dongcheng Subdistrict, Linqu County, in Linqu County
- Dongcheng Subdistrict, Liaocheng, in Dongchangfu District, Liaocheng
- Dongcheng Subdistrict, Shan County, in Shan County

=== Shanxi ===
- Dongcheng Subdistrict, Gaoping, in Gaoping City
- Dongcheng Subdistrict, Yangcheng County, in Yangcheng County
- Dongcheng Subdistrict, Yuncheng, in Yanhu District, Yuncheng

=== Sichuan ===
- Dongcheng Subdistrict, Bazhong, in Bazhou District, Bazhong
- Dongcheng Subdistrict, Dazhou, in Tongchuan District, Dazhou
- Dongcheng Subdistrict, Xichang, in Xichang City
- Dongcheng Subdistrict, Ya'an, in Yucheng District, Ya'an
- Dongcheng Subdistrict, Yibin, in Cuiping District, Yibin

=== Xinjiang ===
- Dongcheng Subdistrict, Kuqa County, in Kuqa County
- Dongcheng Subdistrict, Shihezi, in Shihezi City

=== Zhejiang ===
- Dongcheng Subdistrict, Taizhou, Zhejiang, in Huangyan District, Taizhou
- Dongcheng Subdistrict, Yongjia County, in Yongjia County
- Dongcheng Subdistrict, Yongkang, Zhejiang, in Yongkang City

== See more ==
- Đông Thành
