= Đông Thành =

Đông Thành could be one of the following locations in Vietnam:

- Đông Thành, Vĩnh Long: ward in Vĩnh Long province
- Đông Thành: commune in Tây Ninh province.
- Đông Thành: commune in Nghệ An province.
- Đông Thành: commune in Phú Thọ province.
- Đông Thành: commune in Thanh Hóa province.

== Old places name: ==
- Đông Thành: commune in Bình Minh district-level town, Vĩnh Long province (today part of Đông Thành ward, Vĩnh Long province).
- Đông Thành: commune-level town in Đức Huệ district, Long An province (today part of Đông Thành commune, Tây Ninh province).
- Đông Thành: commune in Yên Thành district, Nghệ An province (today part of Yên Thành commune, Nghệ An province.
- Đông Thành: commune in Thanh Ba district, Phú Thọ province (today part of Đông Thành commune, Phú Thọ province).
- Đông Thành: ward in Hoa Lư provincial city, Ninh Bình province (today part of Hoa Lư ward, Ninh Bình province).
- Đông Thành: commune in Bắc Quang district, Hà Giang province (today part of Vĩnh Tuy commune, Tuyên Quang province).
