= Yejiashan Cemetery =

Archaeological site in Hubei, China

Yejiashan Cemetery (Chinese: 叶家山墓地) is an ancient Western Zhou cemetery and archaeological site in Suizhou, Hubei, China. Extensive archaeological excavations at Yejiashan have uncovered 65 tombs and one horse pit, recovering over 700 artifacts including ceramic and proto-porcelain vessels, bronzes, and jades. Notably, some bronzes have inscriptions of “Zeng 曾”, “Hou 侯 (marquis)”, “Zeng Hou 曾侯 (Marquis of Zeng)”, “Zeng Hou Jian 曾侯谏 (Marquis of Zeng named Jian)”. This evidence, combined with the style of the other burial goods, suggests that Yejiashan Cemetery was the family cemetery of the Marquis of Zeng in the early Western Zhou dynasty. Archaeological research at Yejiashan Cemetery has significantly bettered our understanding of the relationships between the Zeng, E (噩), and Chu states to the east of the Han River in the early Western Zhou.

== Location ==
Yejiashan Cemetery is located at Jiangjiazhai Village, Xihe Town, Suizhou City. It is on a longitudinal elliptical hill of 400m long and 100m wide, 88m above sea level, and 1 km to the north of the Xihuayuan and Miaotaizi Sites. The Piao River passes through the northern and western sides of the hill and flows into the Yuan River (also known as Fu River).

== Discovery and excavation ==
In late December 2010, local farmers from Jiangjiazhai Village stumbled upon 15 bronze vessels while working on their field. They reported the discovery to the local police, as well as the Department of Cultural Relics, applying for government protection of this heritage site.

From January 1 to 17, 2011, the Hubei Provincial Institute of Cultural Relics and Archaeology carried out a rescue excavation of two tombs and surveyed the surrounding area, determining that it was a newly discovered family cemetery of the Western Zhou dynasty.

On February 18, 2011, after the Hubei Provincial Institute of Cultural Relics and Archaeology received approval from the National Cultural Heritage Administration, the Suizhou Yejiashan Cemetery Archaeology Team was established to fully excavate the Yejiashan Cemetery. Archaeologists used cutting-edge technology, such as 3D scanning, to record the process of excavation and reconstruct the ancient burials and landscape.

From February to June 2011 the entire cemetery, containing 63 tombs and a horse pit, was uncovered.

== Findings ==
=== Tombs ===
The tombs of Yejiashan Cemetery can be divided into three groups based on size and burial goods. Large tombs, approximately 6m by 4m (or 20 x 13 ft), are mostly located at the center of the eastern part of the cemetery, and contain lavish burial goods such as bronzes, ceramics, proto-porcelains, jades, and lacquer wares. Medium tombs, approximately 5m by 3m (or 16 x 10 ft), are always found nearby large tombs. These medium tombs contain similar types of grave goods as the large tombs, but always in lesser quantities. Small tombs, approximately 3m by 2m (or 10 x 6.5 ft), are scattered across the whole cemetery. Their grave goods are mostly ceramic vessels and lithic tools, without many of the more extravagant types of items discovered in larger tombs.

=== Horse Pit ===
The horse pit is located in the south of the cemetery. A rectangular shaft pit roughly 3m by 3m (or 10 x 10 ft), it contains two buried horse skeletons.

=== Artifacts ===
Bronze vessels form a major part of the burial collections, with 39 found in total. The bronzes comprised ding (鼎), gui (簋), li (鬲), yan (甗), gu (觚), jia (斝), you (卣), and jue (爵) styles, which are decorated with bird, dragon, spiral triangle, and animal faces. Almost all vessels are made by module casting technique, and many vessels have inscriptions.

Ceramic pottery consists of both fine and sandy ware, some of which had been burned prior to burial. They are all decorated with cord marks. Typologically, they include ding (鼎), gui (簋), li (鬲), yan (甗), dou (豆), zun (尊). All in all, the recovered artifacts reflect a typical set of ritual goods from the Western Zhou dynasty.

== Significance ==
Yejiashan Cemetery is a ground-breaking discovery, building upon archaeological research from the similar tomb of Zeng Hou Yi (Marquis Yi of Zeng). It furthers our understanding of the following questions:

- Although the enfeoffing system in Western Zhou is well recorded in the historic record, the actual process and locations of the enfeoffed states and lands are still unclear. The Yejiashan Cemetery, which dates to the early Western Zhou, shows that there was a Zeng State to the east of the Han River, and its ruler was entitled as marquis.
- Based on the discovery of Yejiashan Cemetery and a regional survey of surrounding areas, we can know that the political center of the Zeng State should be located at the nearby Miaotaizi Site. The juxtaposition of a cemetery and a walled city conforms to the pattern of local states in Western Zhou.
- The large quantity of inscriptions on the bronzes from Yejiashan Cemetery, which amounts to over 400 characters, mentions 16 clans or local states, providing us with clues for further study of the interrelationship between the Zeng, E, Chu, and Sui States.
- The collection of ceramic wares, bronze vessels, and proto-porcelain wares help build a chronological regional framework during the Western Zhou dynasty.
