= Suizhou =

Prefecture-level city in Hubei, China

Suizhou 随州市 Suichow
- Prefecture-level city
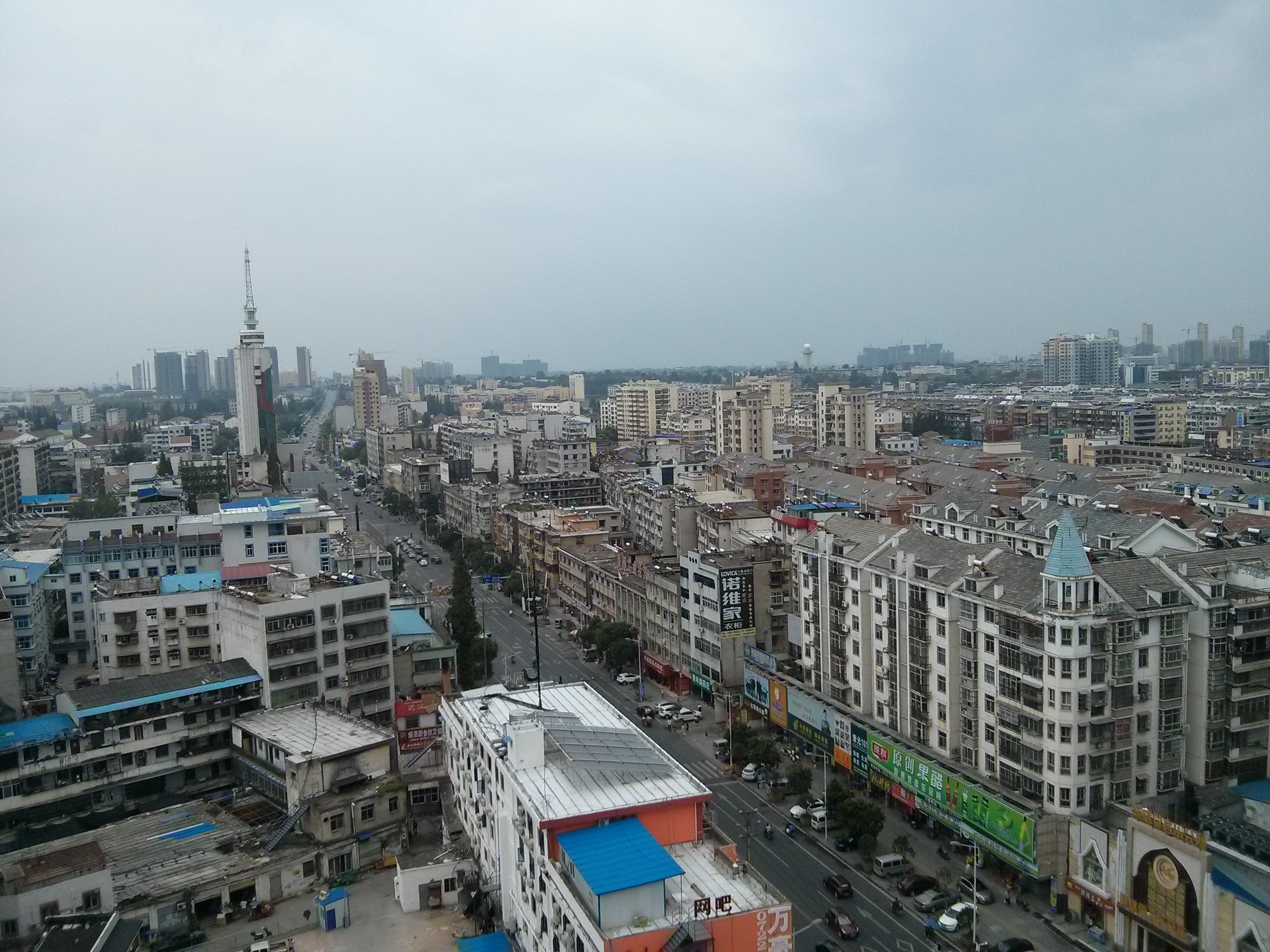
- Suizhou Qingnian Road Lieshan Avenue intersection, eastern view

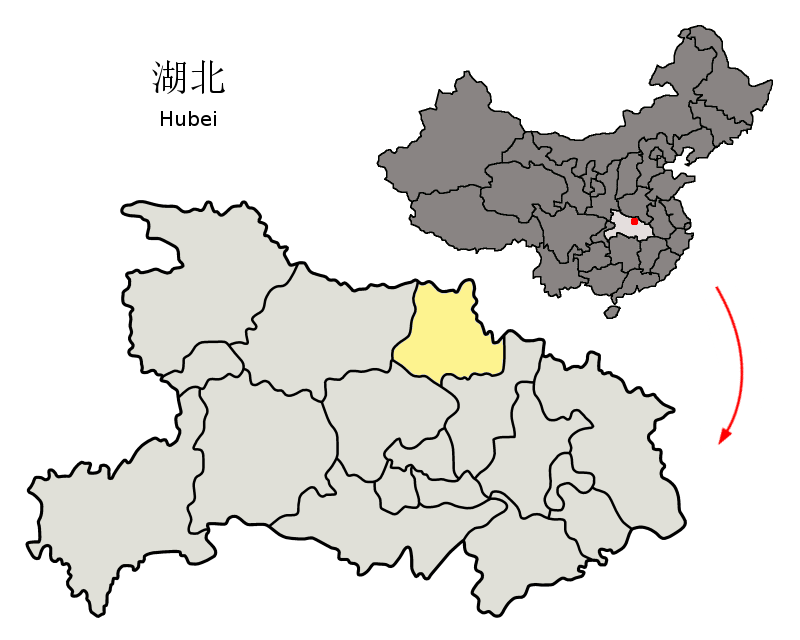
- Location of Suizhou City in Hubei

- Location of the city centre in Hubei
- Coordinates (Suizhou municipal government): 31°41′24″N 113°22′55″E
- Country: People's Republic of China
- Province: Hubei
- County-level divisions: 2
- Township-level divisions: 54
- Municipal seat: Zengdu District

Government
  - CPC Secretary: Ma Qingming (马清明)
  - Mayor: Liu Xiaoming

Area
  - Prefecture-level city: 9,636 km^{2} (3,720 sq mi)
  - Urban (2017): 266.00 km^{2} (102.70 sq mi)
  - Districts: 1,425.4 km^{2} (550.4 sq mi)
- Elevation: 71 m (233 ft)

Population (2004)
  - Prefecture-level city: 2,580,000
  - Density: 268/km^{2} (693/sq mi)
  - Urban (2017): 508,000
  - Districts: 1,873,000

GDP
  - Prefecture-level city: CN¥ 78.5 billion US$ 12.6 billion
  - Per capita: CN¥ 35,901; US$ 5,764
- Time zone: UTC+8 (China Standard)
- Postal code: 441300
- Area code: 722
- ISO 3166 code: CN-HB-13
- Website: suizhou.gov.cn

Suizhou (simplified Chinese: 随州; traditional Chinese: 隨州; pinyin: Suízhōu), formerly Sui County (simplified Chinese: 随县; traditional Chinese: 隨縣; pinyin: Suí Xian, Suixian), is a prefecture-level city in northern Hubei province, People's Republic of China, bordering Henan province to the north and east.

== Etymology ==
The Sui in Suizhou is derived from the ancient 'Suishizu' (随氏族).

== Administration ==
The prefecture-level city of Suizhou administers 5 county-level divisions, including 1 district, 1 county-level city, 1 county and 2 other areas.

- Zengdu District (曾都区)
- Guangshui City (广水市)
- Sui County (随县)
- Suizhou Economic Development Area (随州经济开发区)
- Dahongshan Scenic Area (随州大洪山风景名胜区)

These are further divided into 54 township-level divisions, including 36 towns, 11 townships and 7 subdistricts.

Map
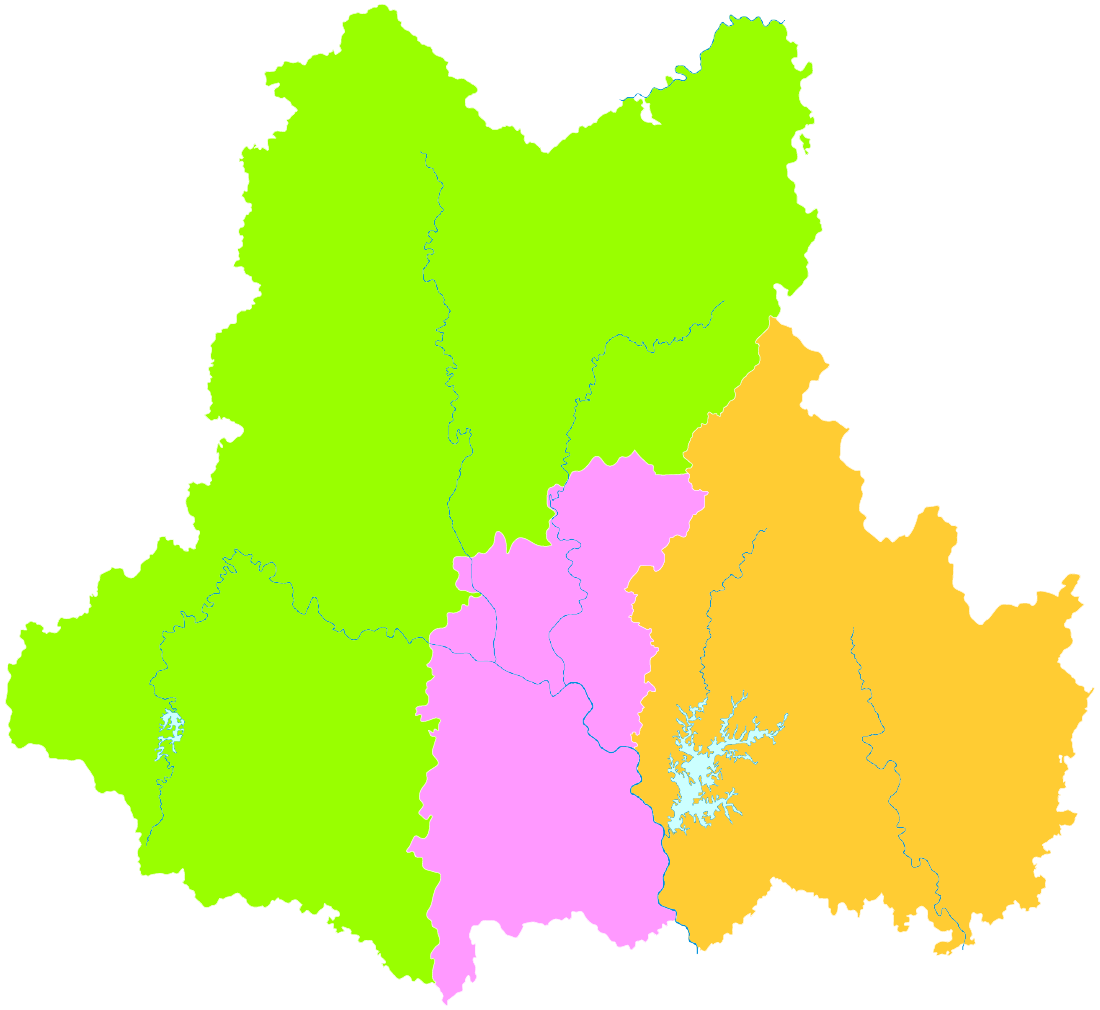

== History ==
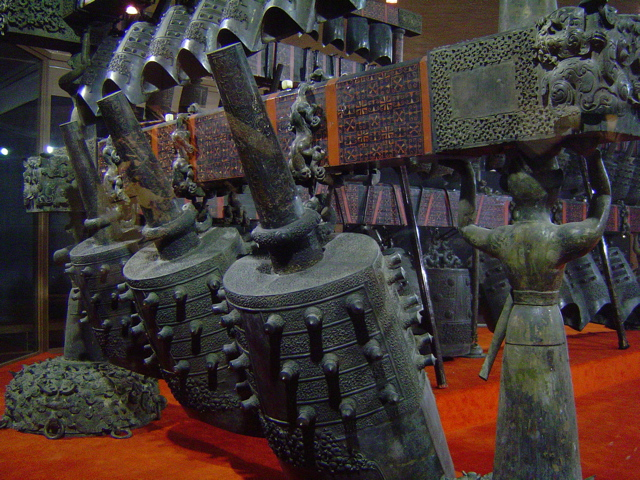
Ancient bronze concert bells found in Zengdu District, Suizhou City. The originals are now kept in the provincial museum in Wuhan.

Suizhou has a long history. During the Spring and Autumn period and Warring States period (771−221 BCE), it was the territory of the State of Sui/Zeng and within the cultural sphere of the State of Chu. Archaeological findings from the Yejiashan Cemetery excavation have yielded new information about the era.

As a prefecture-level city Suizhou has a short history with its current status only granted by the State Council in June 2000.

== Climate ==
Climate data for Suizhou (Zengdu District), elevation 107 m (351 ft), (1991–2020 normals, extremes 1981–present)
Month	Jan	Feb	Mar	Apr	May	Jun	Jul	Aug	Sep	Oct	Nov	Dec	Year
Record high °C (°F)	19.3 (66.7)	26.0 (78.8)	34.9 (94.8)	34.7 (94.5)	36.6 (97.9)	37.7 (99.9)	39.5 (103.1)	41.2 (106.2)	39.5 (103.1)	34.0 (93.2)	28.3 (82.9)	20.8 (69.4)	41.2 (106.2)
Mean daily maximum °C (°F)	7.8 (46.0)	11.1 (52.0)	16.2 (61.2)	22.7 (72.9)	27.2 (81.0)	30.3 (86.5)	32.3 (90.1)	32.0 (89.6)	28.1 (82.6)	22.9 (73.2)	16.4 (61.5)	10.1 (50.2)	21.4 (70.6)
Daily mean °C (°F)	2.8 (37.0)	5.7 (42.3)	10.5 (50.9)	16.6 (61.9)	21.6 (70.9)	25.3 (77.5)	27.8 (82.0)	27.0 (80.6)	22.7 (72.9)	17.0 (62.6)	10.6 (51.1)	4.7 (40.5)	16.0 (60.9)
Mean daily minimum °C (°F)	−1.0 (30.2)	1.5 (34.7)	6.0 (42.8)	11.7 (53.1)	16.9 (62.4)	21.4 (70.5)	24.2 (75.6)	23.5 (74.3)	18.8 (65.8)	12.8 (55.0)	6.3 (43.3)	0.7 (33.3)	11.9 (53.4)
Record low °C (°F)	−11.3 (11.7)	−9.5 (14.9)	−4.8 (23.4)	0.2 (32.4)	7.0 (44.6)	13.1 (55.6)	18.4 (65.1)	14.3 (57.7)	10.7 (51.3)	1.3 (34.3)	−4.4 (24.1)	−12.3 (9.9)	−12.3 (9.9)
Average precipitation mm (inches)	28.8 (1.13)	36.2 (1.43)	55.7 (2.19)	85.3 (3.36)	122.4 (4.82)	156.9 (6.18)	179.8 (7.08)	129.3 (5.09)	67.8 (2.67)	73.8 (2.91)	41.7 (1.64)	19.4 (0.76)	997.1 (39.26)
Average precipitation days (≥ 0.1 mm)	6.7	7.8	8.8	9.9	11.3	10.9	12.7	10.6	8.9	9.2	7.9	5.5	110.2
Average snowy days	4.2	3.2	1.3	0.1	0	0	0	0	0	0	0.6	1.7	11.1
Average relative humidity (%)	74	74	73	74	76	80	83	82	78	77	77	74	77
Mean monthly sunshine hours	111.4	113.1	149.4	168.3	174.6	167.5	191.7	194.4	154.1	150.3	133.8	122.5	1,831.1
Percentage possible sunshine	35	36	40	43	41	40	45	48	42	43	43	39	41
Source: China Meteorological Administrationall-time extreme temperature

== Religion ==
The Catholic minority is pastorally served by its own (dormant?) pre-diocesan Apostolic Prefecture of Suixian (隨縣) which is exempt, i.e. directly dependent on the Holy See (and its missionary Dicastery for Evangelization), not part of any ecclesiastical province.

It was established on 1937.06.17 as Apostolic Prefecture of Suixian (隨縣) / Suihsien / Suihsienen(sis) (Latin adjective), on territory split off from the Apostolic Vicariate of Hankou (漢口).

It is vacant since 1951, without apostolic administrator since 1981, having had only the following incumbents:

- Father Patrick Maurice Connaughton (龔成德), Friars Minor (O.F.M.) (born Ireland) (1937.06.17 – retired 1951.03), died 1967
- Apostolic Administrator Friar Dominic Chen Te-mien, O.F.M. (1951.04.05 – 1981), no ther Ordinariate.

== Transport ==
Suizhou is served by the Hankou–Danjiangkou Railway.

== See also ==
- List of Catholic dioceses in China

== Sources and external links ==
- Government website of Suizhou (in Chinese)
- GCatholic
