= Zengdu, Suizhou =

Zengdu 曾都区
- District
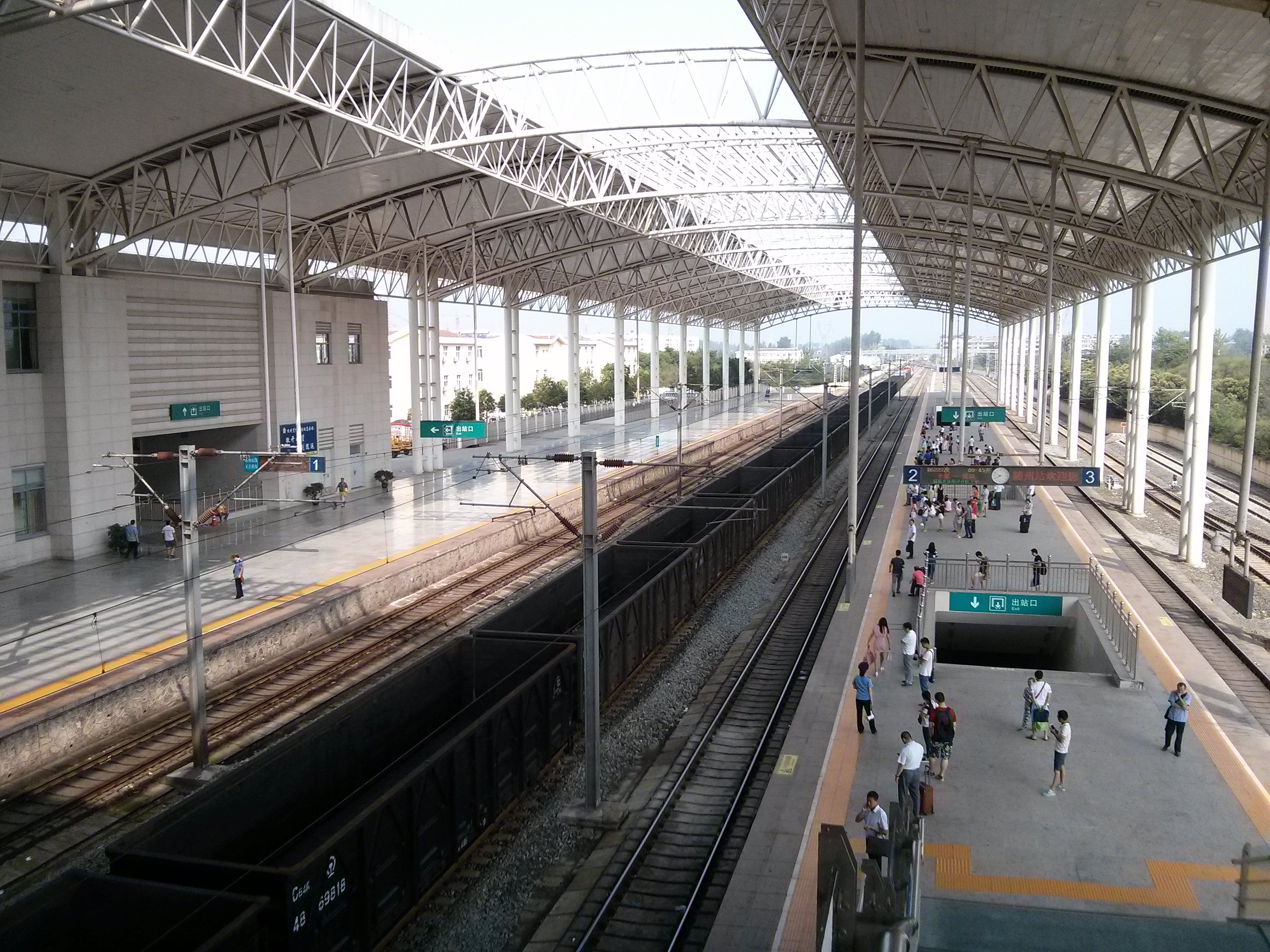
- Suizhou railway station (随州站) platforms

- Location in Hubei
- Coordinates (Zengdu government): 31°42′58″N 113°22′16″E
- Country: China
- Province: Hubei
- Prefecture-level city: Suizhou
- District seat: Xicheng Subdistrict

Area
  - Total: 1,425.4 km^{2} (550.4 sq mi)

Population (2020 census)
  - Total: 699,475
  - Density: 490.72/km^{2} (1,271.0/sq mi)
- Time zone: UTC+8 (China Standard)
- Website: www.zengdu.gov.cn

Zengdu (Chinese: 曾都; pinyin: Zēngdū) is a district of the city of Suizhou, Hubei province, China.

== Administrative divisions ==
Zengdu District administers 4 subdistricts, 5 towns and 2 other township-level divisions:

4 subdistricts are: Xicheng Subdistrict (西城街道), Dongcheng Subdistrict (东城街道), Nanjiao Subdistrict (南郊街道), Beijiao Subdistrict (北郊街道).

5 towns are: Wandian (万店镇), Hedian (何店镇), Luoyang (洛阳镇), Fuhe (府河镇), Xihe (淅河镇).

Other areas: Zengdu Economic Development Zone (湖北曾都经济开发区), Suizhou Economic Development Zone (随州市经济开发区).
