= Đông Thành, Vĩnh Long =

Đông Thành
- Ward
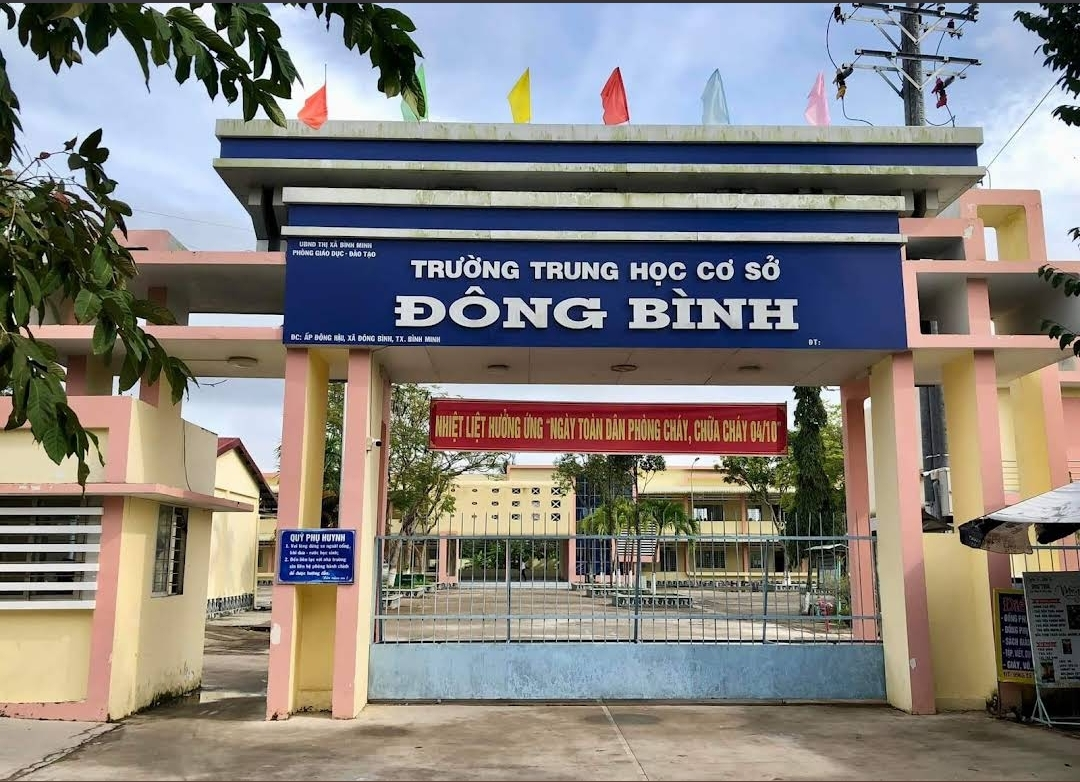
- Đông Bình Lower Secondary School in Đông Thành.
- Interactive map of Đông Thành
- Country: Vietnam
- Province: Vĩnh Long
- Establish: June 16, 2025

Area
  - Total: 44.35 km^{2} (17.12 sq mi)

Population 2025
  - Total: 41,793 people
  - Density: 942.3/km^{2} (2,441/sq mi)
- Time zone: UTC+07:00

Đông Thành is a ward in Vĩnh Long province, Vietnam. It is one of 124 communes and wards in the province following the 2025 reorganization.

== Geography ==
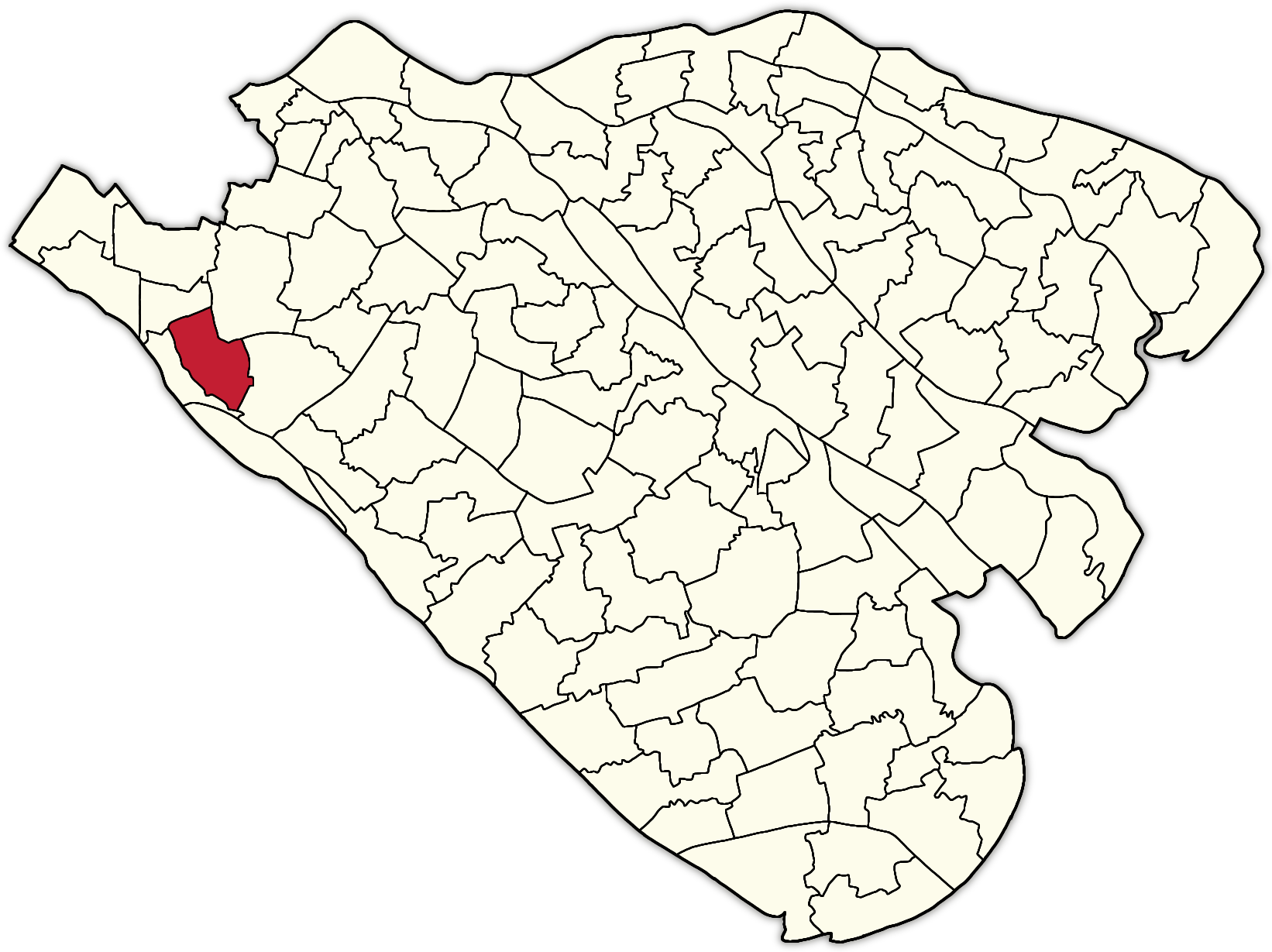
Location of Đông Thành ward on Vĩnh Long province map (highlight in red).

Đông Thành ward has a geographical location:

- To the east, it borders Ngãi Tứ commune.
- To the west and southwest, it borders Cái Vồn ward.
- To the north, it borders Bình Minh ward and Song Phú commune.

== History ==
Prior to 2025, Đông Thành ward was formerly Đông Thuận ward and Đông Bình, Đông Thành, and Đông Thạnh communes belonging to Bình Minh district-level town, Vĩnh Long province.

On June 12, 2025, the National Assembly of Vietnam issued Resolution No. 202/2025/QH15 on the reorganization of provincial-level administrative units. Accordingly:

- Vĩnh Long province was established by merging the entire area and population of Bến Tre province, Vĩnh Long province and Trà Vinh province.

On June 16, 2025, the Standing Committee of the National Assembly of Vietnam issued Resolution No. 1687/NQ-UBTVQH15 on the reorganization of commune-level administrative units in Vĩnh Long province. Accordingly:

- Đông Thành ward was established by merging the entire area and population of Đông Thuận ward, Đông Bình commune, Đông Thành commune and Đông Thạnh commune (formerly part of Bình Minh district-level town).
