= Cái Vồn =

Cái Vồn Phường Cái Vồn
- Ward
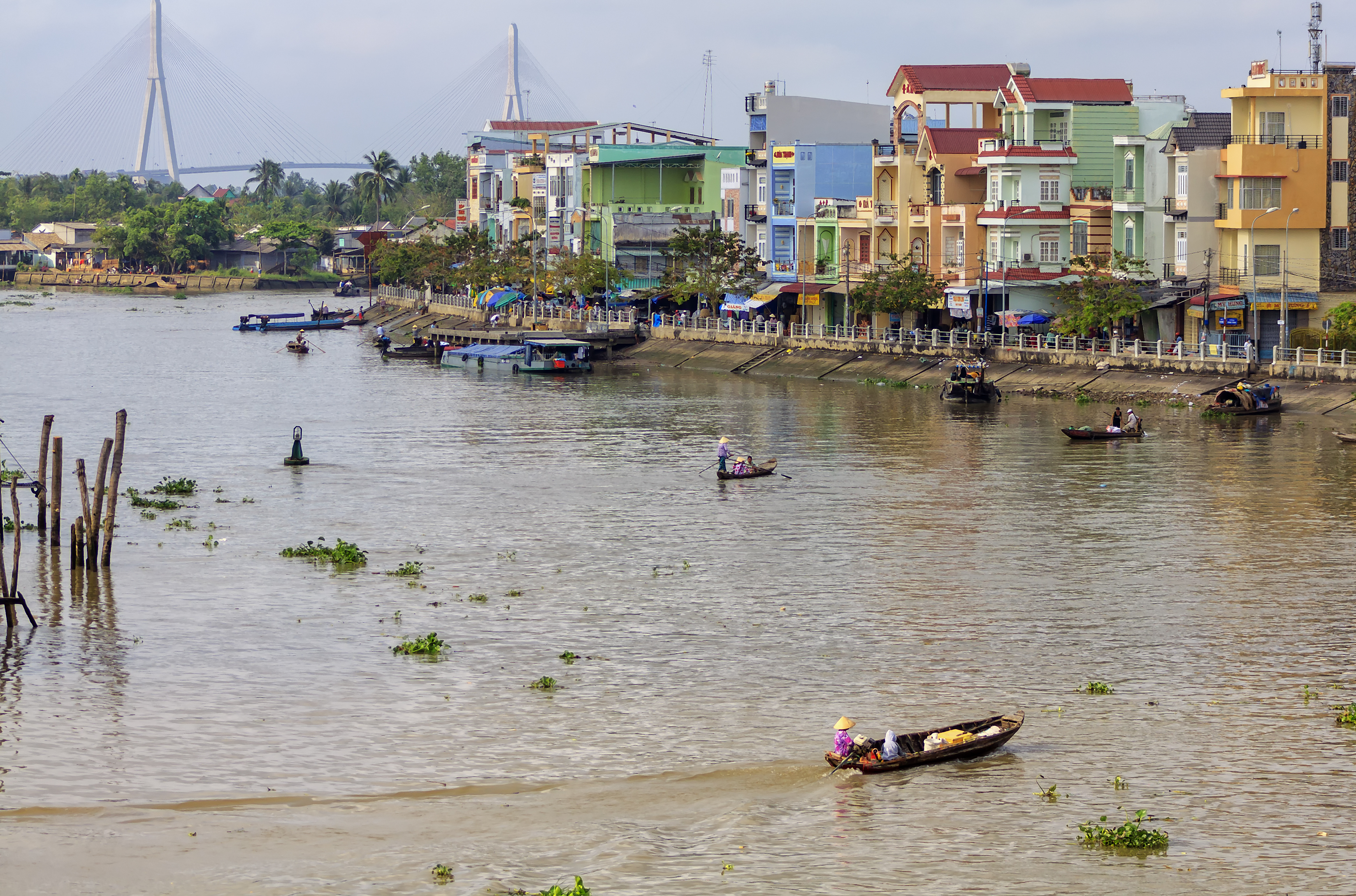
- Riverside House in Cai Von
- Interactive map of Cái Vồn
- Coordinates: 10°5′46″N 105°47′22″E
- Country: Vietnam
- Region: Mekong Delta
- Province: Vĩnh Long
- Established: 28 December 2012

Area
  - Total: 0.8461 sq mi (2.1915 km^{2})

Population (2012)
  - Total: 18,105
  - Density: 21,280/sq mi (8,216/km^{2})
- Time zone: UTC+7 (UTC + 7)

Cái Vồn is ward of Vĩnh Long province, Vietnam.

The ward covers area of 2.1915 km² and its population in 2012 was 18,105 with density of 8.216 citizens/km².

== Geography ==
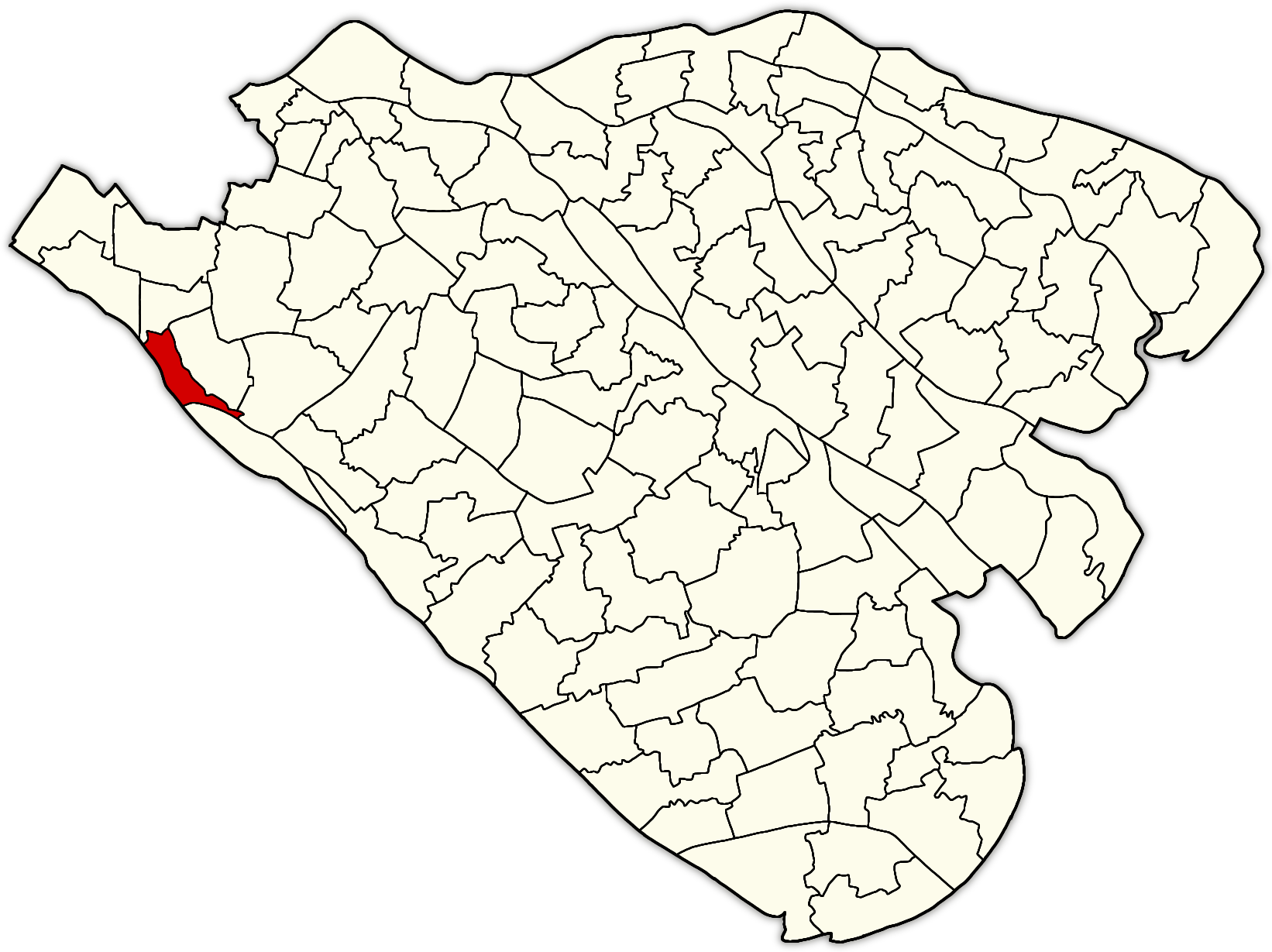
Location of Cái Vồn ward on Vĩnh Long province map (highlight in red).

Cái Vồn ward is situated in the following geographical location:

- To the east, it borders Đông Thành and Ngãi Tứ.
- To the west, it borders Cần Thơ, with the Hậu River serving as the boundary.
- To the south, it borders Lục Sĩ Thành, with the Hậu River serving as the boundary.
- To the north, it borders Bình Minh.

Cái Vồn Ward covers an area of 26.52 km²; as of 2024, it has a population of 36,031 people, resulting in a population density of approximately 1,359 people/km².

== Administration divisions ==
Cái Vồn Ward is divided into 15 residential groups: 1, 2, 3, 4, 5, Mỹ An, Mỹ Hưng 1, Mỹ Hưng 2, Mỹ Khánh 1, Mỹ Khánh 2, Mỹ Lợi, Mỹ Phước 1, Mỹ Phước 2, Mỹ Thới 1, and Mỹ Thới 2.

== History ==
Cái Vồn was originally the name of a market located in Mỹ Thuận Hamlet, An Trường Canton, Vĩnh An District, An Giang Province during the Nguyễn Dynasty. Cái Vồn was also referred to as *Cái Dồn*, in accordance with the local dialect of the Western Region.

In 1932, Cái Vồn became the name of a district within Cần Thơ Province during the French colonial era, having been renamed from the former Trà Ôn District.

In 1957, Bình Minh District—part of Vĩnh Long Province—was established pursuant to Decree No. 10-BNV-NC-NĐ issued by the government of the Republic of Vietnam; the district seat was situated at Cái Vồn, administratively falling under Mỹ Thuận Commune.

After 1975, Cái Vồn served as the district town (administrative center) of Bình Minh District. It was established by carving out territory from Thành Lợi Commune (specifically Thành Phước Hamlet—encompassing the area of the former Hậu Giang Ferry Terminal, now Thành Phước Ward—and Sub-hamlets 2, 3, 4, and 5 of the present-day Cái Vồn Ward) and a small portion of Mỹ Thuận Commune (specifically Mỹ Thới Hamlet—encompassing the site of the former district seat, now Sub-hamlet 1 of the present-day Cái Vồn Ward).

On September 17, 2010, the Ministry of Construction issued Decision No. 844/QĐ-BXD, recognizing Cai Von Town as a Class IV urban area.

On December 28, 2012, the Government issued Resolution No. 89/NQ-CP. Pursuant to this Resolution:

- Binh Minh District was upgraded to Binh Minh Town.
- Cai Von Ward was established based on the adjustment of 175.53 hectares of natural land area and 14,523 residents from Cai Von Town, along with 43.62 hectares of natural land area and 3,852 residents from Thuan Commune. An
- Thành Phước Ward was established based on the adjustment of 359.93 hectares of natural area and the remaining population of 13,703 people from Cái Vồn Town.

Following its establishment, Cái Vồn Ward comprises a natural area of 219.15 hectares and a population of 18,375 people.

The ward's predecessors were Sub-quarters 1, 2, 3, and 4 of the former Cái Vồn Town, along with portions of Thuận Thới and Thuận Tân A Hamlets in Thuận An.

Cái Vồn Ward, located in Bình Minh Town, Vĩnh Long Province, is subdivided into five sub-quarters: 1, 2, 3, 4, and 5. Sub-quarter 5 was formed from the territory previously belonging to the former Thuận An Commune. Accordingly, pursuant to Article 1 of Resolution 1687/NQ-UBTVQH15—and based on the Government's Plan No. 337/ĐA-CP dated May 9, 2025, regarding the reorganization of commune-level administrative units in Vĩnh Long Province (new designation) for 2025—the National Assembly Standing Committee has decided to reorganize and establish commune-level administrative units within Vĩnh Long Province as follows: The entire natural area and population of Mỹ Hòa Commune (Bình Minh Town), the remaining portion of Ngãi Tứ Commune following its reorganization (specifically the Cồn Sừng area of the former Ngãi Tứ Commune, which borders the former Mỹ Hòa Commune), and the remaining portion of Thành Phước Ward (specifically Khóm 3 of the former Thành Phước Ward, Bình Minh Town, Vĩnh Long Province—corresponding to Khóm 5 of Cái Vồn Town, Bình Minh District, Vĩnh Long Province prior to 2013) shall be consolidated to form a new ward to be named Cái Vồn Ward (operating under a two-tier administrative structure as of 2025). Cai Von Ward, Vinh Long Province, comprises 15 residential clusters: Clusters 1, 2, 3, and 4 of Cai Von Ward (Binh Minh Town, Vinh Long Province); Cluster 5 (formerly Cluster 3 of Thanh Phuoc Ward, Binh Minh Town, Vinh Long Province); and the clusters of My Loi, My An, My Phuoc 1, My Phuoc 2, My Thoi 1, My Thoi 2, My Khanh 1, My Khanh 2, My Hung 1, and My Hung 2—which were formerly hamlets of My Hoa Commune.
