= Bình Minh, Vĩnh Long =

Bình Minh Phường Bình Minh
- Ward
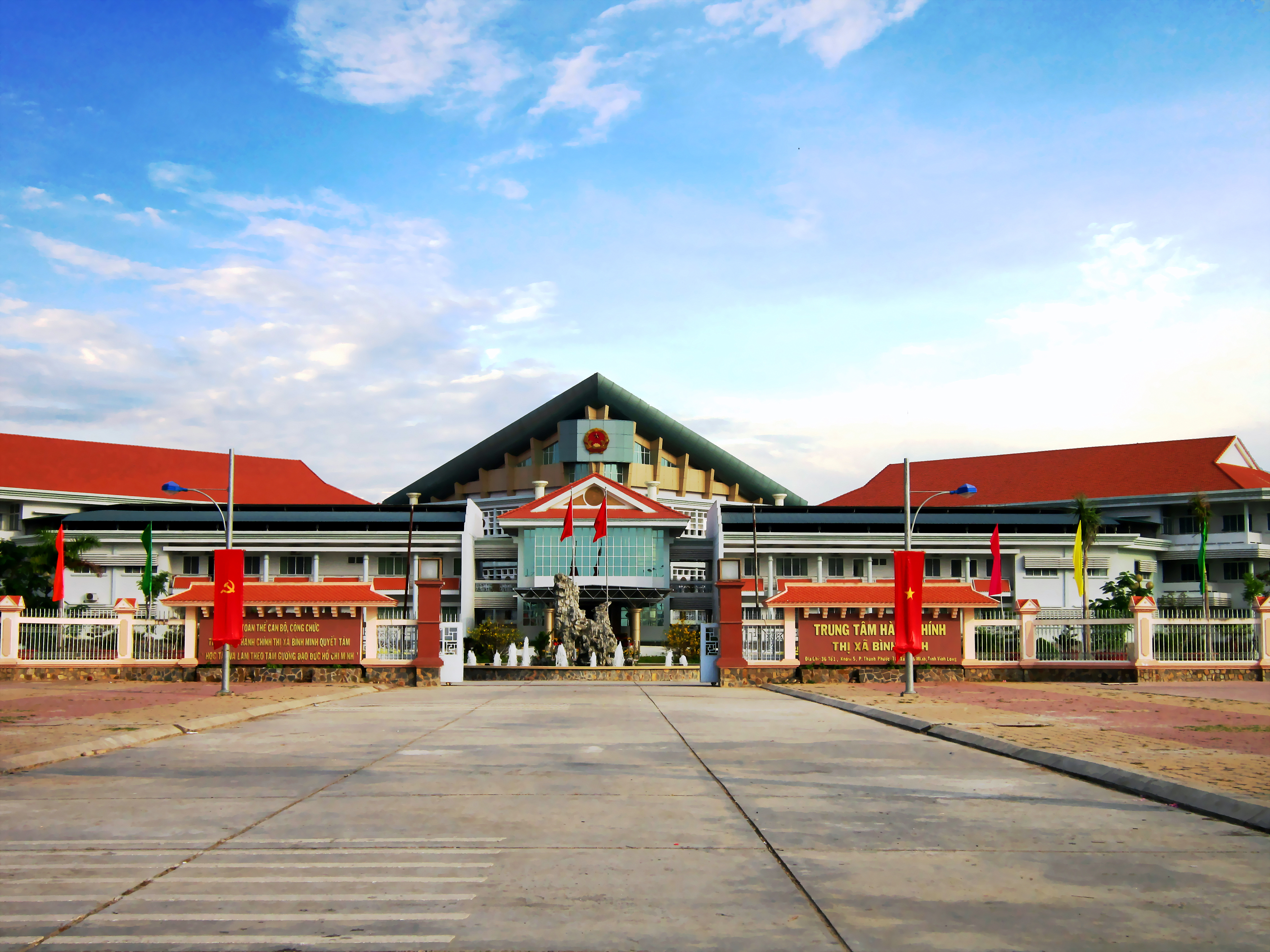
- Bình Minh Ward Administrative Center
- Interactive map of Bình Minh
- Coordinates: 10°5′22″N 105°49′41″E
- Country: Vietnam
- Region: Mekong Delta
- Province: Vĩnh Long

Area
  - Total: 774 sq mi (2,004 km^{2})

Population (2012)
  - Total: 29,806
  - Density: 2,110/sq mi (816/km^{2})
- Time zone: UTC+7 (UTC + 7)

Bình Minh is a ward in Vĩnh Long province, Vietnam.

The commune covers area of 20,04 km^{2} and in 2012 its population was 16.368, with population density of 816 citizens/km².

== Geography ==
Bình Minh Ward is geographically situated as follows:

- To the east, it borders Song Phú Commune.
- To the west, it borders Tân Quới.
- To the south, it borders Cái Vồn and Đông Thành, as well as Cần Thơ, with the Hậu River serving as the boundary.
- To the north, it borders Mỹ Thuận.

Bình Minh Ward covers an area of 23.86 km²; as of 2025, it has a population of 34,193 people, resulting in a population density of approximately 1,433 people/km².

== Administration divisions ==
Bình Minh Ward is divided into 15 residential clusters: 1, 2, 3, 4, 5, Thuận Nghĩa, Thuận Phú A, Thuận Phú B, Thuận Tân A, Thuận Tân B, Thuận Thành, Thuận Thới, Thuận Tiến A, Thuận Tiến B, and Thuận Tiến C.

== History ==
On June 16, 2025, the National Assembly Standing Committee issued Resolution No. 1687/NQ-UBTVQH15 regarding the reorganization of commune-level administrative units in Vĩnh Long Province in 2025. Accordingly, the entire natural area and population of Thuận An Commune—along with a portion of the natural area and population of Thành Phước and Cái Vồn Wards—were consolidated to form a new ward named Bình Minh Ward.

Following the merger, Bình Minh Ward encompasses a natural area of 23.86 km² and has a population of 34,193 people.
