= 1965 in the Vietnam War =

← 1964 1966 →
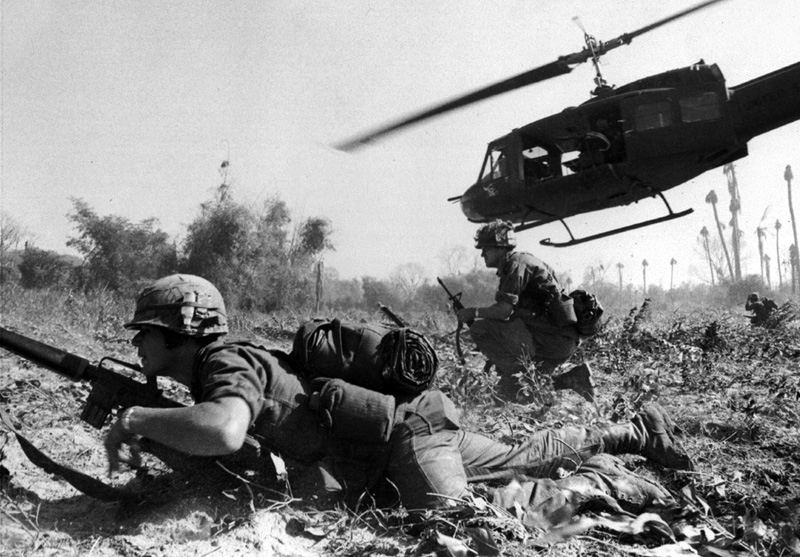
- US Army soldiers disembarking from helicopters in the Ia Drang Valley
Location	Indochina

Belligerents
Anti-Communist forces: South Vietnam; United States; South Korea; Australia; New Zealand; Kingdom of Laos; Republic of China	Communist forces: North Vietnam (Provisional Revolutionary Government of the Republic of South Vietnam) Viet Cong (Laos) Pathet Lao; People's Republic of China; Soviet Union; North Korea

Strength
US: 184,314; South Vietnam: 514,000 (including militia)	

Casualties and losses
US: 1,928 killed South Vietnam: 11,242 killed.	U.S estimate: 35,436 killed

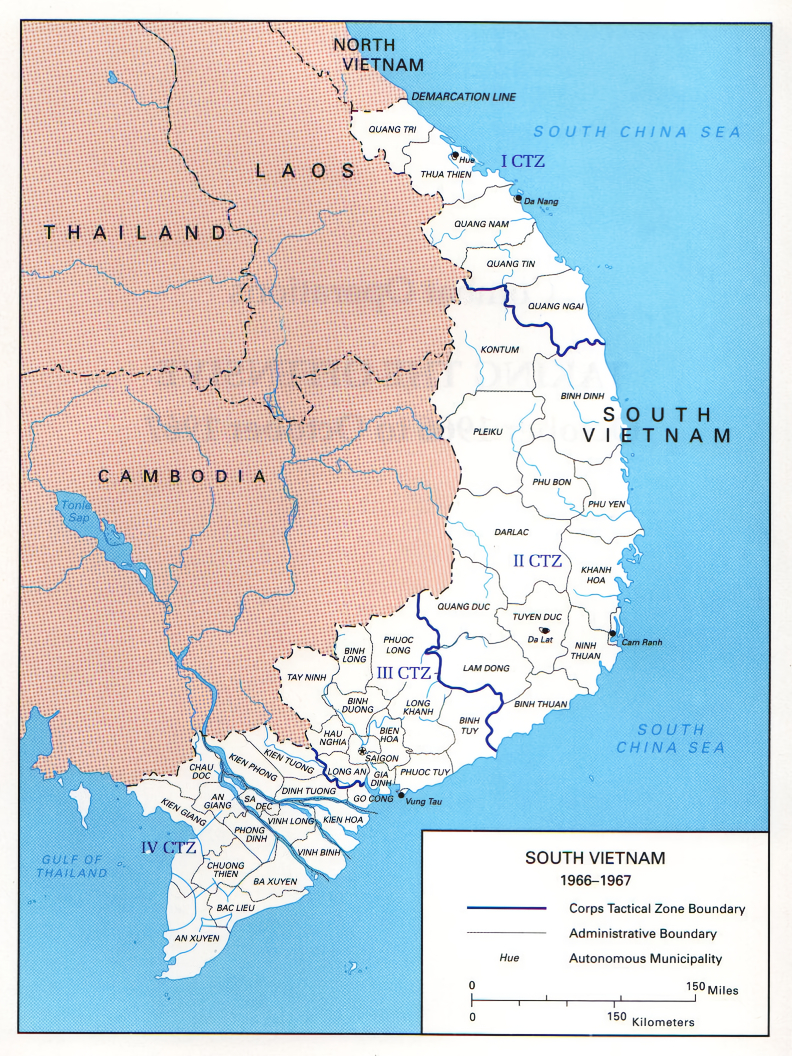
A map of South Vietnam showing provincial boundaries and names and military zones: I, II, III, and IV Corps.

In 1965, the United States rapidly increased its military forces in South Vietnam, prompted by the realization that the South Vietnamese government was losing the Vietnam War as the communist-dominated Viet Cong (VC) gained influence over much of the population in rural areas of the country. North Vietnam also rapidly increased its infiltration of men and supplies to combat South Vietnam and the U.S. The objective of the U.S. and South Vietnam was to prevent a communist take-over. North Vietnam and the VC sought to unite the two sections of the country.

Political instability and internal dissent continued to plague the government of South Vietnam, although in June General Nguyễn Văn Thiệu and Air Marshall Nguyễn Cao Kỳ took control of the country and remained in power for the remainder of the year. In the United States, a majority of Congress and the people supported U.S. participation in the war, although protests against the war became larger and more frequent, especially among college students.

The U.S. began bombing North Vietnam in March, in Operation Rolling Thunder. The U.S. Army and Marines began ground operations to ferret out and defeat the communist forces. U.S. Military Assistance Command Vietnam (MACV), commanded by General William Westmoreland, adopted a strategy of attrition, employing U.S. superiority in firepower, technology and mobility. The usual military tactic of the United States was search and destroy operations in which large U.S. and South Vietnamese units, supported by air and artillery, swept through an area to attempt to engage the communists in battle. The People's Army of Vietnam (PAVN) and the VC, by contrast, relied on hit-and-run operations and ambushes, avoiding set-piece battles except at their own initiative.

In November, the U.S. and PAVN met head-on for the first time in the Battle of Ia Drang. Both sides claimed victory. The U.S. inflicted heavy casualties on the PAVN, but the battle vindicated the conviction by North Vietnam that its military could slowly grind down the U.S.'s commitment to the war.

South Korea contributed an army division to South Vietnam, while Australia, New Zealand and other countries provided smaller numbers of soldiers. North Vietnam received military aid from the Soviet Union and China.

At year's end, President Lyndon Johnson declared a temporary halt to the bombing of North Vietnam and undertook a diplomatic initiative to seek negotiations with North Vietnam. North Vietnam, on its part, aimed to achieve a decisive military victory, but prepared also for an expanded war if the U.S. continued to escalate its involvement.

== January ==
1 January

The South Vietnamese security forces, including the Army of the Republic of Vietnam (ARVN), Regional and Popular Forces, Montagnard irregulars and National Police totaled 567,246 personnel. 23,310 U.S. military personnel were in South Vietnam.

The number of VC guerrillas and PAVN regulars in South Vietnam was a matter of much debate. One U.S. government estimate was that the VC consisted of 40,000 full-time fighters and 80,000 to 100,000 part-time guerrillas. The Department of Defense's fact book estimated that the VC numbered less than 200,000 plus 39,175 political cadre. These numbers presumably included thousands of PAVN soldiers and cadre infiltrated during the previous five years. The first PAVN units dispatched to South Vietnam, consisting of three regiments (about 5,000 men), had arrived in South Vietnam in late 1964. A junior-level Central Intelligence Agency (CIA) analyst, Samuel A. Adams, had just begun work estimating VC numbers; he would later conclude that MACV underestimated VC strength by about one-half.

Both North Vietnam and the United States would rapidly increase the number of their troops in South Vietnam during 1965.

The Battle of Binh Gia concluded as the PAVN/VC withdrew from the battlefield. In six days of fighting, the VC 9th Division had killed 201 South Vietnamese soldiers from the Airborne Division, Marine Division and Rangers and five American advisers.

3 January

Senator Mike Mansfield, considered the U.S. Congress's most knowledgeable person about Vietnam, appeared on television and said that neutralization of South Vietnam through an agreement reached by negotiations between the U.S. and the communist powers might be the best solution to the war. Mansfield was one of several senators who had doubts about the course of U.S. policy in South Vietnam.

6 January

The Armed Forces Council made a show of officially renouncing all their power to Prime Minister Tran Van Huong, who was asked to organize elections. They also agreed to appoint a civilian body and release those arrested in the December coup.

The U.S. Ambassador to South Vietnam General Maxwell Taylor summed up the situation in a telegram to the U.S. government in Washington. "We are faced here with a seriously deteriorating situation characterized by continued political turmoil, irresponsibility and division within the armed forces, lethargy in the pacification program, some anti-US feeling which could grow, signs of mounting terrorism by VC directly at US personnel and deepening discouragement and loss of morale throughout SVN. Unless these conditions are somehow changed and trends reversed, we are likely soon to face a number of unpleasant developments ranging from anti-American demonstrations, further civil disorders, and even political assassinations to the ultimate installation of a hostile govt which will ask us to leave while it seeks accommodation with the National Liberation Front and Hanoi."

Taylor opposed the introduction of U.S. ground units to help fight the VC (as proposed in frustration by President Johnson a few days earlier), endorsing instead a U.S. policy of graduated air attacks against the Ho Chi Minh trail, the supply line for the PAVN/VC itself.

South Vietnamese military strength: January 1, 1965
Regulars (Army, Air Force, Navy, Marine Corps)	246,284
Regional Force (RF)	96,049
Popular Force (PF)	168, 317
National Police	31,395
Civilian Irregular Defense Group	21,454
Coastal Force	3,747
Total	567,246

7 January

A VC company attacked a Popular Forces platoon camped 6 km southeast of Huế. A second Popular Forces platoon was ambushed going to their aid. A reaction force of a Regional Forces company, a rifle company, a troop of M113 armored personnel carriers, and part of the 1st Division's elite Black Panther Reconnaissance Company joined the battle. The fighting was at such close quarters as to prevent fixed-wing aircraft and U.S. Army helicopter gunships from lending support. A second M113 platoon arrived and assaulted the VC flank. When the South Vietnamese searched the battlefield the next morning, they found 50 VC dead, a 60 mm mortar, three light machine guns, and 11 rifles. The relief force lost four dead, four missing, and two carbines.

The VC attacked a post 23 km northwest of the city at Viet An, where an infantry company guarded a platoon of 155 mm howitzers and the headquarters of the 3rd Battalion, 6th Infantry. The defenders fought stubbornly before being forced to withdraw. Republic of Vietnam Air Force (RVNAF) aircraft then hit the post with 24 sorties. A relief force comprising a ranger and two infantry battalions and an armored cavalry troop was sent to the post. A VC ambush was detected and the ARVN successfully attacked forcing the VC to flee. ARVN losses were 37 dead, 45 wounded, and four missing and 33 individual and three crew-served weapons were lost. The VC left 230 dead, including a battalion commander, seven prisoners, and 35 individual and five crew-served weapons.

A VC battalion attacked an ARVN company in Thua Thien, inflicting 22 casualties and capturing 18 weapons, while in Quảng Nam province, the VC ambushed two companies, causing six casualties and the loss of five weapons.

8 January

In Quảng Trị province, the VC ambushed a territorial company, inflicting 14 casualties, while in Thua Thien, they attacked a Popular Forces post, inflicting 20 casualties. Meanwhile, in Quang Nam, the VC simultaneously hit three hamlets, killing 22 territorial soldiers, and capturing 30 more and 42 weapons. An additional 25 civilians and three Popular Forces platoons went missing.

9 January

Huong and the South Vietnamese military again reiterated their commitment to civilian rule through an elected legislature and a new constitution, and that "all genuine patriots" would be "earnestly assembled" to collaborate in making a plan to defeat the communists. Khánh and Taylor were both signatories to this announcement.

12 January

The ARVN 1st Infantry Regiment, 1st Division, encircled an 80-man Local Force VC company 8 km west of Quảng Trị. The ARVN killed 32 VC and captured four prisoners and 19 weapons.

14 January

Two U.S. jets were shot down over central Laos while bombing North Vietnamese supply lines.

15 January

The first two Women's Army Corps soldiers arrived in Saigon.

20 January

While Buddhist protests against the government and the United States intensified, including the burning of a United States Information Service library in Huế, Ambassador Taylor met with a Buddhist leader. He said the Buddhists wanted peace and told Taylor that the leaders of South Vietnam were only interested in the benefits they could derive personally from American aid and would otherwise capitulate to the VC. The Buddhists had been protesting against the government of South Vietnam for the previous two years.

The ARVN 2nd Division launched a block-and-sweep operation 18 km northwest of Tam Kỳ. VC losses were 28 killed and 36 captured. The ARVN suffered one dead and four wounded.

21 January

An ARVN air assault in Kien Hoa Province killed 46 VC and captured 61.

The ARVN 25th Division launched Operation An Dan 70 to hit the VC 506th Battalion in one of its sanctuaries along the Hậu Nghĩa–Long An province border. The 52nd Ranger Battalion engaged VC entrenched along a canal bank and became pinned down. The 2nd Battalion, 49th Infantry was landed by helicopter, but also came under heavy fire and further landings were impossible. The 1st Battalion, 50th Infantry was then transported by boat to link up with the 2/49th. Meanwhile, the rangers attempted to disengage and fell back to form a perimeter along the Vaico Oriental River, followed by the VC who clung so close as to make support by aircraft and artillery difficult. Vessels of the 22nd River Assault Group then arrived to cover the rangers as they scrambled aboard the boats. VC losses were 73 killed and it was estimated that air and artillery fire had killed 130 more. ARVN losses were 33 dead and 52 wounded.

The ARVN 7th Division attacked a VC force massing in Ba Tri district, Kien Hoa Province. An armored cavalry troop, an airborne battalion, and a ranger battalion advanced in line abreast northeast out of Ba Tri toward the village of Tan Xuan. A second armored cavalry troop and several infantry companies stood in reserve. After a bombardment by Vietnamese aircraft and artillery, US helicopters landed an infantry battalion to two landing zones northeast and northwest of Tan Xuan. As the troops swept toward the blocking forces at the landing zones, they had multiple contacts with the VC. When the VC fell back to prepared positions, air and artillery fire assisted M113s and soldiers in overrunning them. The attack continued until dark. The VC lost 50 killed, 61 captured and 58 suspects along with two 60 mm mortars and 33 individual weapons. The prisoners revealed that the allies had caused 350 casualties. ARVN losses were seven dead and 20 wounded. The VC shot down two helicopters, one of which was destroyed.

22 January

Responding to reports of VC activity 14 km southeast of Bạc Liêu, the ARVN 21st Division deployed a company from the 42nd Ranger Battalion by US helicopters to the area. Following airstrikes, the rangers encircled and then overran the VC. VC losses were 51 killed, 26 captured, 19 suspects detained and 27 weapons captured. ARVN casualties were three dead and seven wounded.

23 January

Four American enlisted soldiers from the 362nd Signal Company failed to return from a fishing trip near Qui Nhon. Search parties eventually found their corpses in shallow water. The VC had shot all four in the head, bound their legs and arms, and weighted their bodies to keep them submerged.

26 January

In a speech, former Vice President Richard Nixon argued the U.S. military effort should be escalated to destroy communist supply lines and staging areas in Laos and North Vietnam. He said the U.S. must "either get out, surrender on the installment plan through neutralization, or... find a way to win."

26–27 January

In response to reports of VC recruiting parties on the edge of the Plain of Reeds, the ARVN 7th Division launched an operation against the hamlet of Ap Bac. Two companies of the 512th Battalion and one of the 261st Battalion along with several hundred recruits were encircled by rangers, airborne, infantry and mechanized forces in the hamlet of Thanh Thoi northwest of Ap Bac. The fighting continued until dusk as the VC broke down into small groups to escape. The ARVN remained on the field overnight, but by dawn of the 27th, the VC were gone. VC losses were 152 dead, three captured and three recoilless rifles, a light machine gun, and 21 individual weapons captured. Prisoner interrogations led the allies to conclude that the VC had carried off another 167 dead and 70 wounded. ARVN losses were 18 dead and 67 wounded, with one M113 destroyed. US losses were two wounded and one destroyed helicopter.

27 January

Amidst continuing political chaos in South Vietnam, General Nguyễn Khánh and the Armed Forces Council overthrew the civilian government of Trần Văn Hương in a bloodless coup, replacing Houng with civilian Nguyễn Xuân Oánh. Khánh, who had been prime minister during most of 1964, had been hovering in the background for some time, so the coup d'état was not a great surprise. Ambassador Taylor cabled Washington that Khánh had an alliance with the Buddhist Institute headed by Thích Trí Quang. Taylor said, "The most sinister aspect of this affair is the obvious danger that the Buddhist victory may be an important step toward the formation of a government which will eventually lead the country into negotiations with Hanoi and the National Liberation Front [VC]."

In response to the coup, National Security Council director McGeorge Bundy and Secretary of Defense Robert McNamara wrote a memo to President Johnson. They gave the president two options: use American military power to defeat the insurgency, or negotiate thus attempting to "salvage what little can be preserved". Bundy and McNamara favored the first option; Secretary of State Dean Rusk disagreed. Johnson accepted the military option and sent a telegram to Ambassador Taylor in Saigon saying "the U.S. will spare no effort and no sacrifice in doing its full part to turn back the Communists in Vietnam." President Johnson had crossed the Rubicon.

27 January – 4 February

In Laos two coups took place. On 27 January General Phoumi Nosavan once again attempted to seize control of the government but was opposed by forces loyal to General Kouprasith Abhay. On 29 January Colonel Bounleut Saycocie independently mounted his own coup, but after a short term takeover of Vientiane's radio station and infrastructure his forces returned to Government control and were then used by Kouprasith to suppress Phoumi's coup.

28–29 January

The ARVN 23rd Division launched an operation to clear the VC held hamlet of Phu Lac, 14 km southeast of Tuy Hòa. Two battalions of the 44th Infantry, the division reconnaissance company, a troop of M113s and some territorials launched the attack but were stopped by VC fire. US and RVNAF airstrikes followed and then US helicopters dropped CS powder on the VC positions. The ARVN delayed their advance allowing the CS to disperse and the VC to regroup and they held back seven successive assaults before evacuating by boat at nightfall. The following day the ARVN found 85 VC dead and captured six VC, two light machine guns, six individual weapons, and ten suspects. Civilians reported seeing 60 VC bodies being evacuated by sampans. ARVN losses were seven dead and 14 wounded.

== February ==
6 February

The VC's Radio Liberation announced that the VC had shot two American prisoners of war as reprisals against the Vietnamese government, which had sentenced two VC to death.

After the ARVN 9th Division's intelligence staff located a VC company on the Rach Muong Khai canal in Đức Thành District, an infantry battalion and four territorial companies supported by the 23rd River Assault Group engaged them in an all-day operation. VC losses were 47 killed and 33 weapons captured. ARVN losses were two dead and three wounded.

7 February

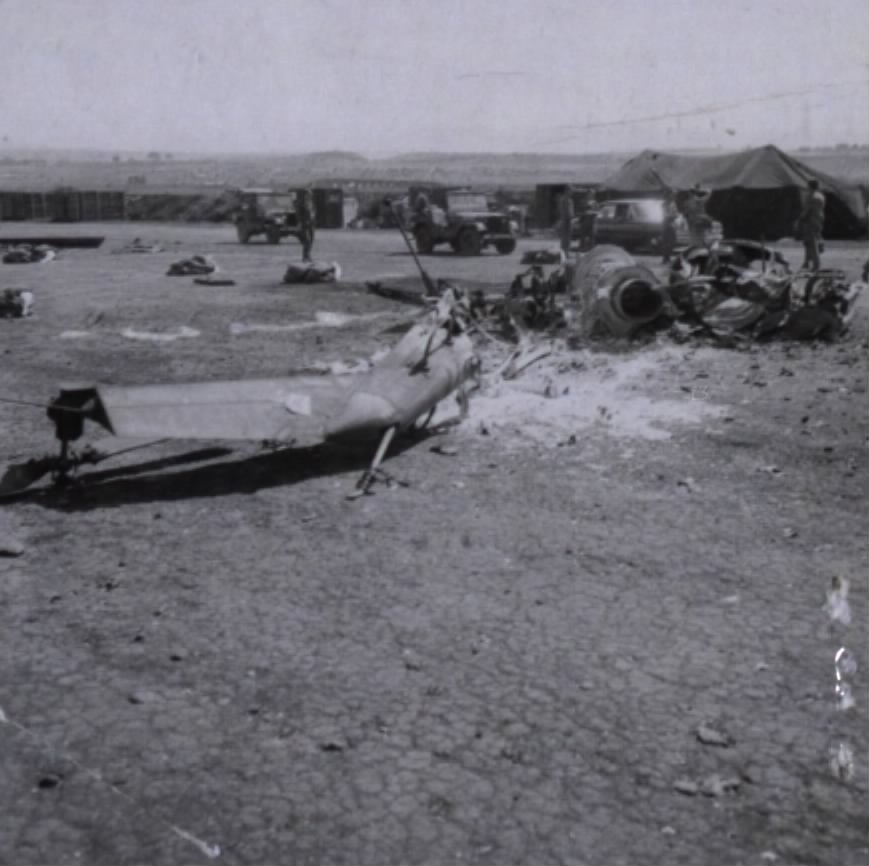
A destroyed helicopter at Camp Holloway

The VC attacked Camp Holloway near Pleiku killing eight Americans, wounding 128, destroying 10 U.S. aircraft and damaging a further 15. McGeorge Bundy (visiting South Vietnam) and General Westmoreland visited Pleiku that day. Bundy strongly recommended a reprisal attack against North Vietnam. Bundy reported to Johnson "The situation in Vietnam is deteriorating and without new U.S. action defeat appears inevitable--probably not in a matter of weeks or perhaps even months, but within the next year or so.... There is still time to turn it around, but not much."

In retaliation, Johnson ordered Operation Flaming Dart: 49 retaliatory sorties by American and RVNAF planes targeted PAVN bases near Đồng Hới; a second wave targeted VC logistics and communications near the Vietnamese Demilitarized Zone (DMZ). Among the pilots was Air Marshal Kỳ. Poor weather limited the damage caused by the strikes. One plane and its pilot were lost.

The Premier of the Soviet Union, Alexei Kosygin, was visiting Hanoi during the bombing. The Soviets were furious that an American attack was carried out while Kosygin was present and motivated to provide additional assistance to North Vietnam.

Bundy sent a memorandum to Johnson advocating "a new US action" without which "defeat seems inevitable". Bundy said that "any negotiated US withdrawal today would mean surrender on the installment plan."

Elsewhere in Pleiku province, the PAVN 320th Regiment captured territorial posts as guerrillas destroyed several New Life hamlets along Highway 14, forcing the inhabitants to move to VC-controlled areas. Further north in Kontum, the PAVN 101st Regiment overran Dak Giao Regional Forces post and shelled Dak Pek Camp. Other VC "liberated" hamlets north of Dak To as their garrisons fled. To the southeast in Binh Dinh province, a VC battalion overran an infantry company, five Popular Forces platoons, and a howitzer section at Gia Huu post. Another VC battalion crushed an infantry company and three Popular Forces platoons at Duong Lieu hamlet 13 km north of Phù Mỹ district town. ARVN losses totaled 333 casualties, a 105 mm howitzer, and four crew-served and 306 individual weapons. In neighboring Phu Yen province, the VC penetrated two hamlets, destroying 48 houses, and inflicting 44 casualties while suffering 37 casualties themselves.

8 February

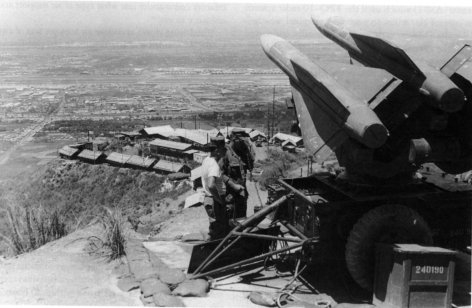
HAWK missiles overlooking Da Nang Air Base

The USMC 1st LAAM Battalion based on Okinawa arrived at Da Nang Air Base and by 9 April its HAWK SAMs were operational at the base.

The VC continued to attack small posts, hamlets, and district towns in II Corps. In Binh Dinh, elements of MR 5's 2nd and 10th Regiments ambushed two companies of the 40th Infantry and an M113 troop in Nhong Pass, 5 km north of Phu My, as they drove north along Highway 1 to relieve Gia Huu. After 57 mm recoilless rifles had destroyed two M113s, the armored troop pulled back, then withdrew entirely when it ran out of ammunition. Airstrikes could not prevent the VC from overrunning the infantry and mauling additional troops that came in support. Four US advisers managed to escape to Phu My. The ARVN lost 280 casualties and considerable equipment. VC losses from the battle and two subsequent days of aerial bombardment reportedly numbered several hundred. The debacle, along with other actions, left the 40th Infantry Regiment combat ineffective, with just 522 men present for duty.

9 February

As bombing of North Vietnam continued, the People's Republic of China issued a statement that "We warn U.S. imperialism: You are overreaching yourselves in trying to extend the war with your small forces in Indochina, Southeast Asia, and the Far East. To be frank, we are waiting for you in battle array." On the same day, U.S. National Security Adviser McGeorge Bundy told Senator Mike Mansfield that the Johnson administration "was willing to run the risk of a war with China" if an invasion of North Vietnam was deemed necessary.

The U.S. Embassy in Moscow was attacked by a mob of about 3,000 Asian and Russian students who were protesting against the American bombing of North Vietnam. Two reporters, Adam Clymer of the Baltimore Sun and Bernard Ullman of the Agence-France news agency, were injured, and more than 200 windows in the building were shattered before Moscow police intervened.

The first twenty of 1,819 wives and children of South Vietnam-based American civilian and military personnel departed that nation, by order of Johnson. The rest, including the dependents of Taylor and Westmoreland, departed over the next 15 days.

The VC used loudspeakers to call for the surrender of a Regional Forces company bivouac. The South Vietnamese agreed to surrender then opened fire on the VC as they approached. The VC then hit the camp with 60 mm mortars as their infantry charged across an open field, penetrating the perimeter. The company commander called in artillery and air support to help repulse the attack. US advisers reported that small-arms fire accounted for most of the 85 dead the VC left behind. ARVN losses were lost two dead and 14 wounded.

9–10 February

Two hundred VC approached the hilltop fort guarding the town of Đức Phong, 137 km north of Saigon. After briefly bombarding the district headquarters with mortars and recoilless rifles, the VC used a loudspeaker to proclaim, "We only want to kill the Americans. All the rest can go free if they leave their weapons." Nearly all of the 130 territorials garrisoning the post fled, including the district chief. Only the four-man subsector advisory team and five territorial soldiers remained defiant. A 30-minute battle ended with the VC killing everyone except for one American whom they took prisoner. After burning a neighboring Montagnard hamlet and mutilating the bodies of the three dead Americans, the insurgents departed with their prisoner. The man died in captivity. Seven gunships from the 145th Aviation Battalion escorted ten UH–1B transports bearing a special forces quick reaction force to the scene. The gunships struck the VC as they withdrew from the town, killing 14. The VC returned fire, hitting several helicopters, one of which crashed. In addition to losing the advisory team, the Americans lost one killed and four wounded aviators. Four Vietnamese soldiers died, and ten were wounded when the VC attacked Duc Phong. The rebels hauled off a .30-caliber machine gun, a 60 mm mortar, five automatic rifles, and 64 rifles. Three ranger companies flown in on the afternoon of the tenth lost five wounded, when they briefly clashed with the VC.

9–11 February

Two airborne battalions were deployed by US helicopters to two landing zones 24 km northeast of Binh Gia. The 6th Airborne Battalion met little resistance at Landing Zone Alpha, but the VC 272nd Regiment gave the first two companies of the 5th Airborne Battalion an unwelcome reception at Landing Zone Bravo northeast of the hamlet of Cu Bi, hitting 12 helicopters, downing three of them. As a fierce firefight developed, VC soldiers set the grass in the landing zone on fire. The forces at LZ Alpha moved overland towards Bravo arriving at 17:00 where they established a perimeter for the night. As darkness fell, the VC began a series of ground assaults interspersed with mortar bombardments. The fighting continued until dawn on the 10th when the VC withdrew. After evacuating its wounded and receiving resupply, the task force resumed its sweep, assisted on the 11th by the 7th Airborne Battalion. The VC avoided contact as the airborne uncovered a regimental hospital, a battalion training camp, and a supply dump. By the time Operation 21/Nguyen Van Nho ended, the VC had lost 91 killed and two soldiers and 36 weapons captured, including a 57 mm recoilless rifle and two machine guns. The airborne lost 22 dead and 95 wounded. Three of the downed U.S. Army helicopters were destroyed. One American aviator died, and 11 others along with two advisers were wounded.

10 February

VC sappers blew up a hotel used as an enlisted men's barracks in Qui Nhơn, killing 23 U.S. soldiers, two VC sappers and seven civilians.

A VC battalion crossed from Cambodia to attack the Tien Bien CIDG camp and a nearby Popular Forces post in Châu Đốc Province. To discourage reinforcement, 81 mm mortars bombarded Chau Doc, killing one soldier and wounding two soldiers and seven civilians. Three times the insurgents assaulted Tien Bien, supported by a heavy volume of 57 mm recoilless rifle fire but were repulsed. Finally, the VC withdrew back into Cambodia. One American and eight South Vietnamese special forces soldiers suffered injuries at Tien Bien. Five territorials and four of their dependents died and 11 suffered wounds at the Popular Forces post. The VC left behind ten dead, three prisoners, 11 weapons, and a large quantity of ammunition. Observers saw eight sampans carrying VC casualties back to Cambodia.

10 February-mid-March

In order to counter a VC campaign of assassination, terror, and sabotage in two coastal districts 10 km southeast of Hue, the 1st Division's 3rd Infantry Regiment sent a battalion, an additional rifle company, an M113 troop, a Popular Forces platoon, and two howitzer platoons to secure the area. By 1 March, these tactics had killed five VC and captured a Front district leader, twelve VC, and supply caches. Intelligence then indicated that a VC company had fortified itself in a village and the 3rd Infantry commander immediately launched an attack that killed 24 VC, captured six more along with 17 suspects, and seized several weapons, including a 60 mm mortar. The 3rd Infantry then returned to original operational area, killing another 50 VC, mostly by artillery fire, and captured a mortar and 26 individual weapons.

11 February

In response to the Qui Nhơn attack Johnson ordered Operation Flaming Dart II: 155 sorties and air strikes by U.S. and RVNAF aircraft.

In Hanoi, Soviet Premier Kosygin announced the Soviet Union had agreed to assist North Vietnam to defend itself from air attacks, by providing surface-to-air missiles (SAMs), jet fighter planes, technical support and advisers.

On his way back to Moscow from Hanoi, Kosygin stopped in Beijing for the second time in less than a month, and met with Mao Zedong, with a suggestion that the two nations help the United States to "find a way out of Vietnam" that would end the continuing war there; Mao's response was a warning that the Soviets should not use Vietnam as a bargaining issue in negotiations with the U.S., and refused to agree.

13 February

Johnson approved Operation Rolling Thunder, the Joint Chiefs of Staff plan for the sustained bombing of North Vietnam. Over an eight-week period, U.S. warplanes planned to bomb fixed targets and interdict military traffic along roads in southern North Vietnam. Johnson did not immediately launch Rolling Thunder.

14–15 February

VC troops destroyed An Luu village headquarters, 5 km northeast of Quang Tri. The next morning, a Popular Forces platoon set up a blocking position north of the village as an infantry battalion advanced from the south and six M113s moved in from the west. After failing to break out to the north, the VC assumed defensive positions along a stream, only for the advancing infantry and M113s to overrun them. ARVN losses were one dead, three wounded, and one M113 damaged. VC losses were 37 killed, four captured and 30 weapons lost.

15–18 February

ARVN forces partly captured Xuan Pho hamlet in Tư Nghĩa district on the 15th. Two Regional Forces companies repulsed a counterattack by the VC 38th Battalion on the 18th. The VC then withdrew to fortifications in the northwestern corner of the hamlet. Regional and Popular Forces attacked in Xuan Pho while M113s advanced on the neighboring hamlet of Nam Phuoc. The ARVN commanders refused to follow the advice of US advisers, failed to block an escape route and when the VC finally broke and ran, refused to pursue them, allowing 150–200 VC to escape. The VC lost 25 dead and 13 weapons in their initial attack, and another 79 dead and 23 weapons in the ARVN counterattack.

16 February

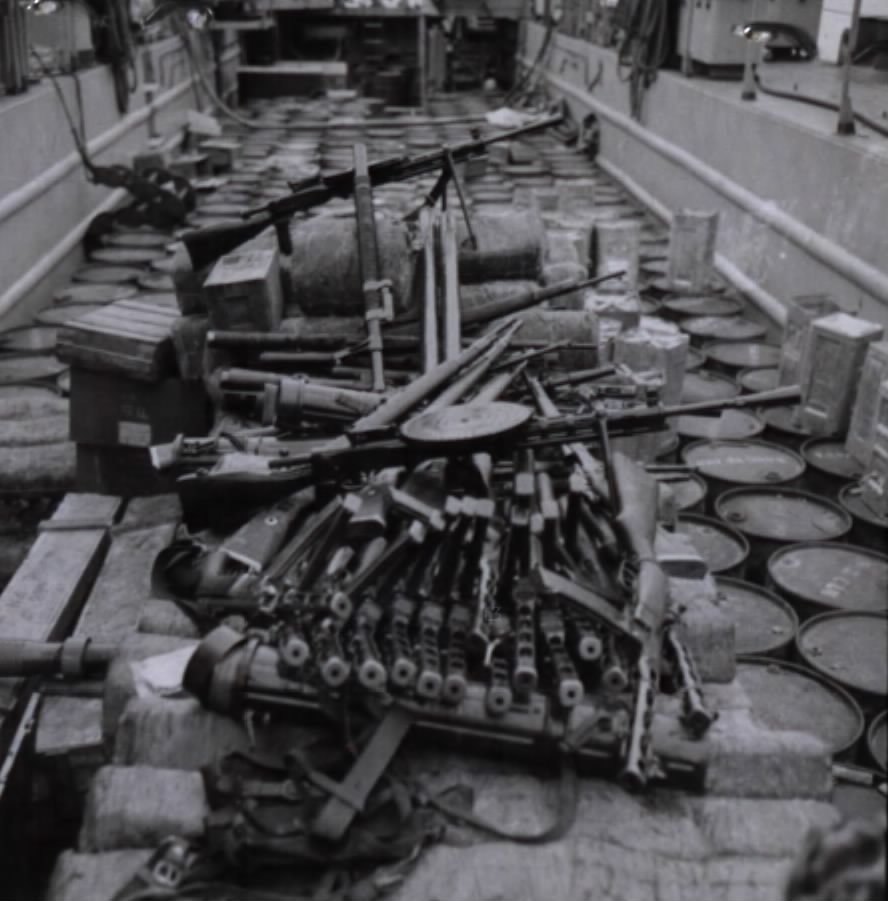
Weapons and munitions captured at Vung Ro Bay

In the Vung Ro Bay Incident, an American helicopter pilot spotted a 100-ton North Vietnamese naval trawler unloading munitions on a beach at a remote bay on the coast of central South Vietnam. RVNAF aircraft sank the ship and the defenders and crew were later killed or captured after a firefight with South Vietnamese naval commandos. The incident spurred further United States Navy involvement in the Vietnam War.

The Armed Forces Council of South Vietnam appointed medical doctor Phan Huy Quát as prime minister.

Radio Moscow, the official English-language broadcasting station of the Soviet Union, warned that American bombing raids on North Vietnam could lead to a world war. "The flames of war starting in one place could easily spread to neighboring countries and, in the final count, embrace the whole world", the broadcast noted, and admonished that "responsibility for the dire consequences of such a policy rests with America."

17 February

On the United States Senate floor, Senator Frank Church said "The Saigon government is losing its war, not for lack of equipment, but for lack of internal cohesion" and the best solution would be the negotiation of a neutral South Vietnam. Church's speech was supported by several other prominent Democratic Party Senators, including George McGovern. Church's call for a neutral South Vietnam echoed similar statements by French President Charles de Gaulle, the Pope and the Secretary General of the United Nations. Former President Eisenhower and several Republicans supported Johnson's policy. Eisenhower advised Johnson not to negotiate from weakness.

The ARVN 2nd Division attacked a VC battalion on a ridge 30 km northwest of Tam Ky. Two battalions and a ranger company advanced south from Qui Son, while a detached company assumed a blocking position behind the VC. As the infantry approached the Nui Lac San Ridge, one of the battalion commanders violated instructions to remain concentrated. He dispersed his troops causing the attack to fall apart. The VC charged down the ridge and a melee ensued until the ARVN were able to withdraw covered by airstrikes. ARVN losses were 41 dead, 18 wounded, and seven missing along with 39 weapons. VC losses were unknown, but multiple sources indicated that the airstrikes had killed several hundred.

18 February

Influential columnist Walter Lippman in The Washington Post said escalation of the war would be a disaster. "For this country to involve itself in such a war in Asia would be an act of supreme folly."

19 February

Colonel Phạm Ngọc Thảo and General Lam Van Phat mounted a coup d'état to overthrow General Khánh, head of the Armed Forces Council. The coup failed but the instability forced Khanh from power. North Vietnam later revealed that Thao was a communist agent. The coup collapsed when the U.S., in collaboration with Generals Nguyễn Chánh Thi and Cao Văn Viên, assembled units hostile to both Khanh and the current coup into a Capital Liberation Force. Saigon was recaptured "without a shot" the next day by loyal troops and Khanh was restored to power

As the 3rd Company, 11th Airborne Battalion searched Da Ngu 2 village near Vung Ro Bay, their US advisor was killed. The unit then stormed bunkers in the village and called in airstrikes that destroyed the village. VC losses were 54 killed and four captured. Allied losses were two killed and four wounded.

20–24 February

ARVN forces attempted to reopen Highway 19 which had been blocked by the VC since 30 January. ARVN losses were 43 dead, 72 wounded, and 58 missing, with 41 individual and five crew-served weapons lost as well. VC losses were unknown, but MACV thought they were heavy, mostly from airstrikes. Nonetheless, Highway 19 remained closed to allied traffic.

21 February

The 15 generals comprising South Vietnam's High National Council — Nguyễn Văn Thiệu, Nguyen Van Cao and Nguyễn Cao Kỳ — voted to remove General Khánh from leadership as prime minister, and replaced him with a caretaker civilian premier, Trần Văn Hương.

22 February

Westmoreland requested that two battalions of United States Marines be assigned to protect Da Nang Air Base from the increasing threat of attacks by the VC.

22–23 February

The ARVN 3rd Battalion, 42nd Infantry, ran into an enemy force armed with AK–47s and RPG–2s between Dak To and the Cambodian border. Outclassed, the unit recoiled in disorder. The next day, the regimental commander, Lieutenant colonel Lai Van Chu, personally led a second battalion in a counterattack that captured some of these new weapons. In the process, the South Vietnamese identified their foe as the PAVN 101st Regiment. MACV's strict rules required further confirmation before it would add the unit to its enemy order of battle in South Vietnam.

23 February

The ARVN 39th Ranger Battalion and 5th Infantry Regiment troops were landed by US helicopters to raid eight VC-held hamlets on a peninsula 32 km southeast of Danang. Assisted by armor and a Regional Forces company that came overland, the troops converged, killing 93 VC and capturing ten.

Two VC battalions ambushed a battalion-sized force near Phuoc Tuy's border with Binh Tuy. The ARVN lost ten dead, nine wounded, 58 missing, one mortar, one light machine gun, and 44 individual weapons, with one armored car destroyed. VC casualties were unknown, but believed to be heavy.

25 February

Khánh departed South Vietnam. He was persuaded to leave by his fellow generals and by Colonel Wilson of MACV. Air Marshall Kỳ became the de facto leader of South Vietnam.

26 February

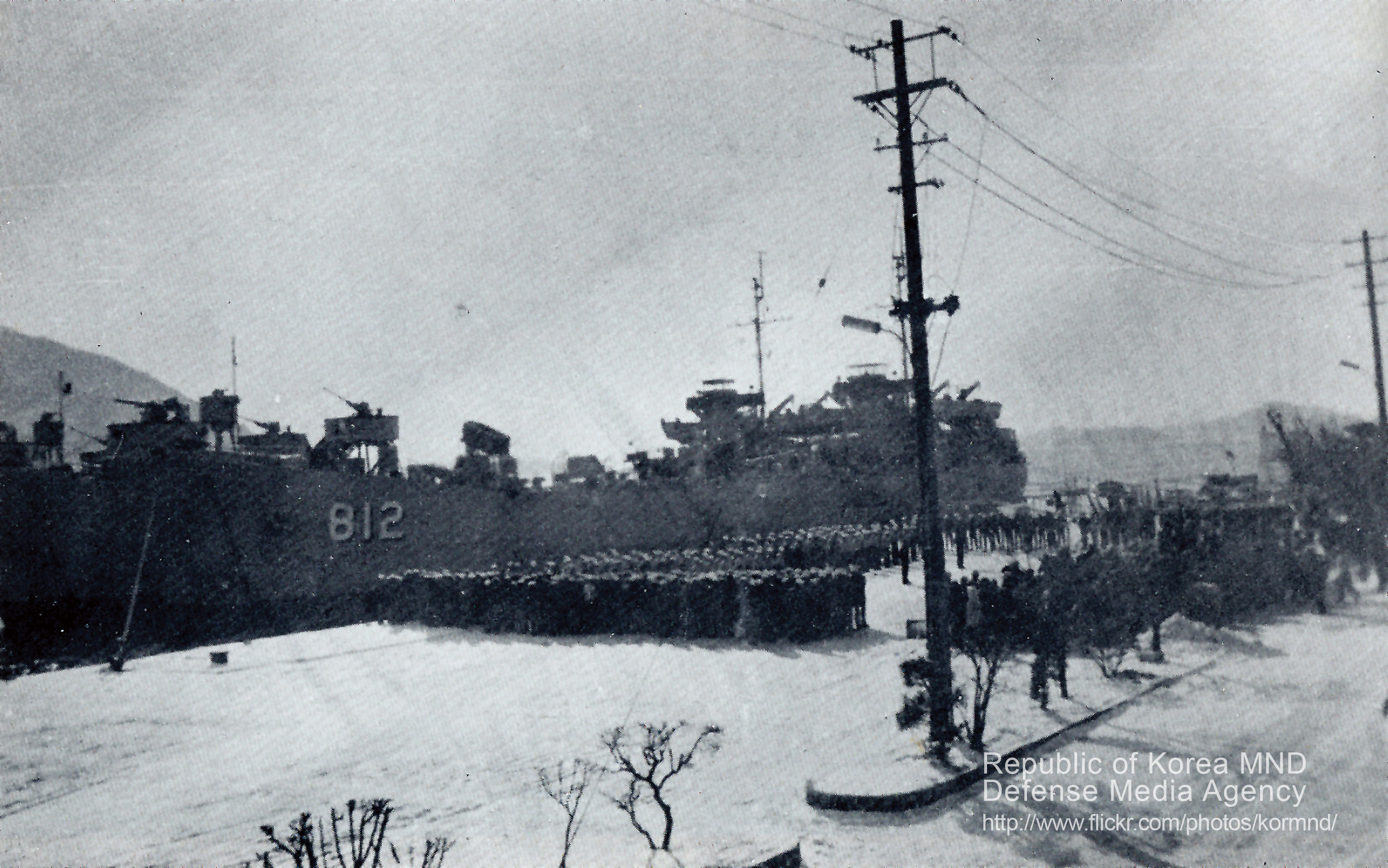
The initial South Korean forces arrive in South Vietnam

The first South Korean troops arrived in South Vietnam in a brigade group known as Dove Force. These included engineers, a medical unit, military police, a navy LST, liaison staff, and other support personnel. Dove Force was deployed to Biên Hòa and helped build schools, roads and bridges. Medical teams are reported to have treated over 30,000 South Vietnamese civilians. The civilian operations in the early southern part of the campaign are reported to have had some success.

27 February

The U.S. Department of State issued a white paper to the press, Aggression From the North: The Record of North Viet-Nam's Campaign to Conquer South Viet-Nam, as a part of the U.S. government's effort to justify the escalation of the role of the U.S. in the war. As a CIA employee and National Security Council staffmember would note later, the paper "proved to be a dismal disappointment... the only hard information we had about North Vietnamese participation and supplies and so forth came from information that was much too highly classified to include, and the only information that was of sufficiently low classification was pretty thin gruel."

28 February

The U.S. and South Vietnam announced that sustained bombing of North Vietnam would begin during the coming week. As a result of the announcement, North Vietnam's leaders ordered the evacuation of children and elderly residents from Hanoi and other major cities.

== March ==
1 March

Taylor met with generals Thiệu and Trần Văn Minh in Saigon to request permission for the assignment of the Marines to Da Nang Air Base. The generals raised no objections, but asked that the Marines arrive "in the most inconspicuous way feasible".

In a memo to the Secretary of the Army, Stephen Ailes McNamara advised "I want it clearly understood that there are unlimited appropriations available for the financing of aid to Vietnam... under no circumstances is a lack of money to stand in the way of aid to that nation."

2 March

Operation Rolling Thunder was launched. One hundred and four U.S. fighter-bombers and 19 RVNAF aircraft hit targets in the largest U.S. bombing raid to date against North Vietnam. Five U.S. planes and one RVNAF plane were shot down. The operation was meant to last eight weeks, but instead lasted more than three years.

Previously, North Vietnam and its allies China and the Soviet Union had indicated a willingness for negotiations leading to the neutralization of South Vietnam and the withdrawal of the U.S. The bombing resulted in a hardened and less flexible communist position. North Vietnam shut down channels it had with Canada and France for exploring negotiations.

3–7 March

The ARVN 2nd Division mounted an operation to evacuate the Viet An outpost in Quảng Tín province which had been under siege by the VC since 7 February. The allies killed 120 VC, with villagers reporting that the VC had carried off another 150 casualties. ARVN losses were 25 dead, 35 wounded and five missing.

4 March

An angry mob assembled outside the U.S. Embassy in Moscow to protest the bombing of North Vietnam, before finally being driven away by police on horseback and soldiers. The next day, the Soviet Union formally apologized to the U.S. government and began replacement of 310 broken windows in the embassy building and the removal of stains from more than 200 inkpots that had been shattered against the walls.

5–12 March

During a visit to Saigon Chief of Staff of the United States Army General Harold Keith Johnson met with senior officers and advised them that he had a "blank checque" from President Johnson to prosecute the war and asked then what they need to win.

6 March

McGeorge Bundy wrote a memo to Johnson saying: "Last night, Bob McNamara said for the first time what many others have thought for a long time - that the Pentagon and the military have been going at this thing the wrong way round from the very beginning: they have been concentrating on military results against guerrillas in the field, when they should have been concentrating on intense police control from the individual villager on up."

VC mortars bombarded Quang Tri. When the commander of the 1st Infantry led four M113s to find the mortars, the VC ambushed the column 1 km west of the city. An antitank weapon destroyed the command vehicle, killing the regimental commander, his deputy, and three other soldiers.

8 March

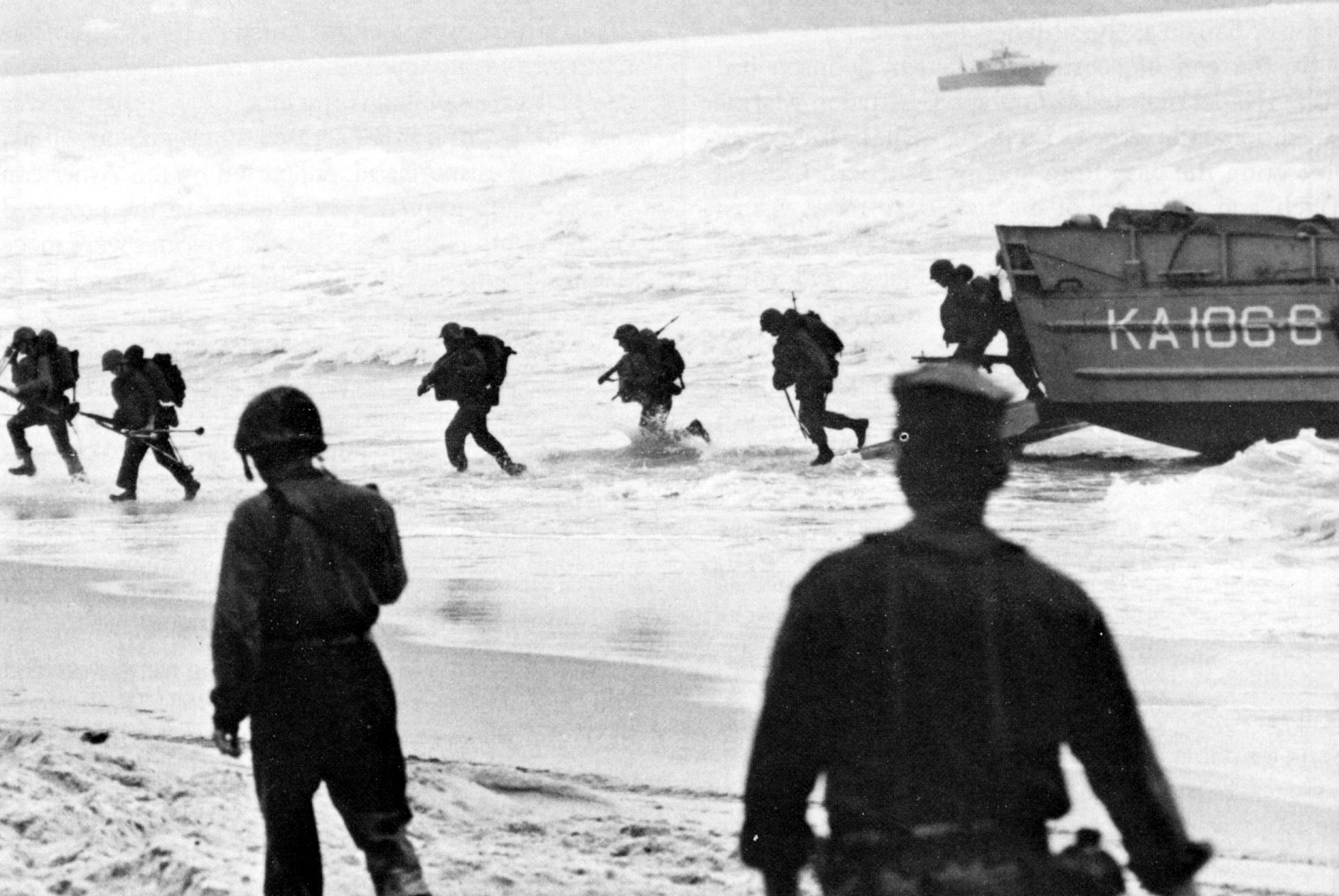
9th Marine Expeditionary Brigade comes ashore at Da Nang

1,400 Marines of the U.S. 9th Marine Expeditionary Brigade began to land on beaches near Da Nang. The arrival of the Marines heralded the direct involvement of American combat units in the war. The Marines had the responsibility of guarding the Da Nang Air Base but were ordered to "not, repeat not, engage in day-to-day actions against the Viet Cong." By the end of March the Marines at Da Nang numbered almost 5,000 Although there were 23,000 American military personnel in South Vietnam already, the deployment represented "the first body of Americans to go to the embattled southeast Asian nation as a fighting military unit."

The VC attacked the Kannack CIDG camp, part of the defenses of Highway 19, 24 km northwest of An Khe. At 01:40, the VC initiated an hour-long bombardment, during which sappers crept forward to clear lanes through the camp's barbed wire. After overrunning two outposts, infantry stormed the main camp, but the 550 Strikers held with the help of flares dropped by aircraft. Dawn brought US Army gunships and USAF A-1s, which harried the VC as they withdrew. The VC left 131 dead and 65 weapons including AK-47s, RPG-2s, a recoilless rifle, and a heavy machine gun. The CIDG troops lost 33 dead and 27 wounded. Three US Army Special Forces soldiers were killed.

9 March

A VC heavy weapons battalion and four infantry battalions struck Hoài Ân district northwest of Qui Nhon. The attackers easily overran four paramilitary outposts in the Kim Son Valley but had trouble at a fifth, Ha Tay, where the 883rd Regional Forces Company put up stiff resistance. When the VC approached Ha Tay, the company commander withdrew his troops to a ridge that the VC could only approach on a narrow front. Over the next few hours, his 71 men suffered nearly 50 percent casualties as they rebuffed multiple attacks by a VC battalion. The defenders reportedly killed more than 200 VC before they ran out of ammunition and retreated. In recognition of the company's valor, the United States awarded the unit the Presidential Unit Citation. Airstrikes killed approximately 160 VC in Hoài Ân and other VC losses were 59 killed, 38 wounded and one captured. ARVN losses were 31 killed, 26 wounded and 44 missing and 40 weapons lost. One USMC advisor was killed and another wounded.

10 March

In Washington, Assistant Secretary of Defense John McNaughton sent a memo to National Security Adviser McGeorge Bundy outlining the U.S. objectives in South Vietnam in percentage terms: "70% – to avoid a humiliating US defeat...; 20% – to keep SVN [South Vietnam]...territory from Chinese hands; 10% – to permit the people of SVN to enjoy a better, freer way of life.

The first drawings were held under Australia's new birthday lottery system of conscription. At the Department of Labor and National Service in Melbourne, Representative Dan Mackinnon drew marbles from a barrel as part of the "birthday ballot" until there were sufficient eligible men to meet the quota of 4,200 draftees. The results were kept secret, with a policy that "Although pressmen will be able to watch and photograph the drawing of the first marble they will not be allowed to see or photograph the number on it." Young men whose birthdays were selected were "balloted out" and would be notified within four weeks.

11 March – March 1973

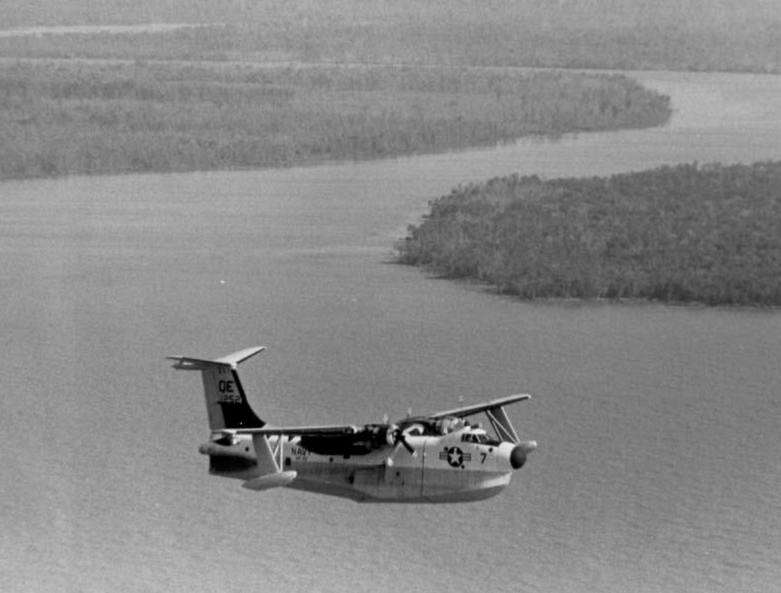
An SP-5B Marlin conducts a Market Time patrol

Operation Market Time, a U.S. Navy operation began off of the coast of North and South Vietnam with patrols along the coast and out to 150 miles (240 km) offshore, in order to disrupt North Vietnam's supply lines to the PAVN/VC in the south.

12 March

Vice President of the United States Hubert Humphrey had dinner with the Ambassador of the Soviet Union Anatoly Dobrynin in Washington. Dobrynin asked why the U.S. bombed North Vietnam while the USSR Premier Kosygin was visiting Hanoi. Dobrynin advised that the USSR was now committed to the support of North Vietnam, saying "We can't be a leader and stand by and ignore the bombing of the North Vietnamese."

13 March

A VC company attacked two Regional Forces companies that were protecting repair crews between Phu Cat and Phu My. An M113 troop from Phu Cat arrived promptly, putting an end to the raid and killing 30 VC.

14 March

Two airborne companies were landed by US helicopters to raid a VC prisoner-of-war camp 56 km northwest of Qui Nhon. The troops killed seven VC and captured 11 more while liberating 35 ARVN prisoners. The VC had removed the two Americans living in the camp 12 hours before the raid.

16 March

82-year old Alice Herz stood at the corner of Grand River Avenue and Oakman Boulevard in Detroit, doused herself with two cans of flammable cleaning fluid, then set herself ablaze in protest against the war. She left a note that said, "I choose the illuminating death of a Buddhist to protest against a great country trying to wipe out a small country for no reason." Two bystanders smothered the flames, but she died of her burns 10 days later.

17 March

The CIA and Defense Intelligence Agency issued an estimate of military strength in South Vietnam. The armed forces of South Vietnam numbered 567,000, of which 245,000 belonged to the ARVN and the remainder to the Regional and Popular Force militia. The VC was estimated to number between 50,000 and 60,000 regulars and 100,000 militia.

20 March

After hearing from General Johnson that it would take five years of fighting and 500,000 American troops to win the war, the Joint Chiefs of Staff recommended to McNamara to change the American mission from being "not simply to withstand the Viet Cong... but to gain effective operational superiority and assume the offensive", and that two additional divisions of combat troops be transferred to South Vietnam for that purpose. "To turn the tide of war," the memo said, "requires an objective of destroying the Viet Cong, not merely to keep pace with them, or slow their rate of advance."

21 March

The ARVN 7th Division launched Operation Tien Giang 10/65 in Kien Hoa Province, 40 km southeast of My Tho. ARVN forces encircled a VC company in Tan Xuan village. The VC attempted to escape in small detachments rather than fight. One squad surrendered after the ARVN killed its leader. VC losses were 30 killed, including the company commander, 25 captured, 13 suspects detained and 17 weapons captured. ARVN losses were four wounded.

22 March

Quoting Associated Press (AP) photographer Horst Faas and unidentified sources, AP reporter Peter Arnett broke the story that U.S. and South Vietnamese forces were using gas warfare in combat. Though he emphasized that these were "non-lethal" gases dispensed by helicopters and bombers, Arnett wrote that "one gas reportedly causes extreme nausea and vomiting, another loosens the bowels". Hours after the story was revealed, a spokesman for the U.S. Department of Defense confirmed for afternoon papers that the story of the use of gas, but said that it was only being used by "South Vietnam's armed forces". Two days later, U.S. Secretary of State Rusk would hold a press conference to respond to the controversy, saying "We are not embarking upon gas warfare in Vietnam. There has been no policy decision to engage in gas warfare in Vietnam. We are not talking about agents or weapons that are associated with gas warfare... We are not talking about gas that is prohibited by the Geneva Convention of 1925."

24–25 March

The first Teach-in to protest the war was held at the University of Michigan, 3,500 people attended.

25 March

China announced that it was ready to "send its personnel to fight together with the Vietnamese people to annihilate the American aggressors."

Republican senators John Sherman Cooper and Jacob Javits called on Johnson to support negotiations between North and South Vietnam without any preconditions.

25–26 March

The ARVN 21st Division conducted an air assault operation 20 km southwest of Vị Thanh. Two helicopters were damaged by VC fire in the initial landing. The troops failed to make significant contact but the next day they killed 70 VC, captured 20 and captured more than 1,360 kilograms of materiel.

26 March

Westmoreland, said in a report to Washington that the South Vietnamese armed forces had "begun to show evidence of fragmentation and there is no longer an effective chain of command".

26–28 March

The 21st Ranger Battalion ran into a heavily fortified force on a hill west of Highway 14, 10 km south of Dak Sut. The PAVN 101st Regiment surrounded the rangers who were unable to be relieved or extracted due to difficult terrain and heavy fire. After two days the rangers were able to escape at night through PAVN lines. ARVN losses were 24 dead, 47 wounded, seven missing, and 18 weapons and one mortar lost. The PAVN lost 82 dead and three weapons. The battle gave MACV confirmation that a major PAVN unit was operating in South Vietnam.

27 March

A lightning strike detonated electrically controlled mines around the Plei Do Lim special forces camp in Pleiku Province. The explosions killed 14 and wounded 74.

Three ARVN battalions were landed by US helicopters in War Zone C, 30 km northeast of Tay Ninh. The raiders killed 64 VC and captured 113 suspects, 31 weapons, six tons of mines, and 400 tons of rice.

29 March

In the face of disagreement among U.S. military leaders about where and how many U.S. combat troops should be stationed in Vietnam, McNamara, Westmoreland, Ambassador Taylor and the Joint Chiefs met in Washington. The Chiefs and Westmoreland wanted two U.S. combat divisions sent to Vietnam along with one combat division from the Republic of Korea. Taylor disagreed. McNamara did not take a position. In meetings the next day, President Johnson agreed only to the assignment of two additional U.S. combat battalions to South Vietnam, but he approved an expansion and extension of the bombing of North Vietnam under Operation Rolling Thunder.

After a three-year testing period that had started with the beginning of Operation Ranch Hand on 29 December 1961, the United States moved into the second phase of the operation with the heavy use of defoliants and herbicides in combat zones. Initially, four tactical herbicides, codenamed Purple, Pink, Green and Blue, were used, with Purple, a combination of 2,4-Dichlorophenoxyacetic acid (2,4-D) and 2,4,5-Trichlorophenoxyacetic acid (2,4,5-T) being the used the most.

30 March

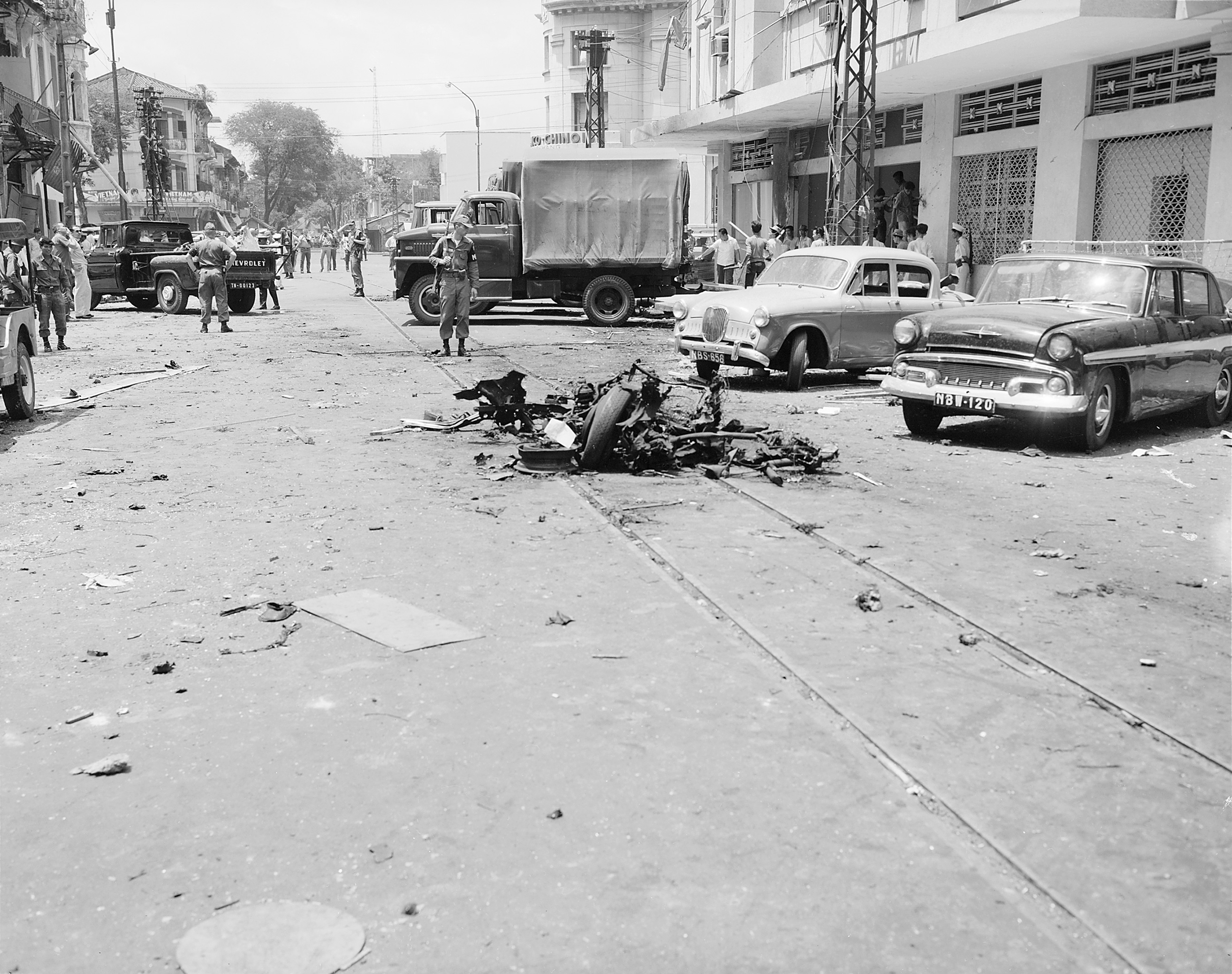
Aftermath of VC car-bombing outside U.S. Embassy

The VC exploded a car bomb in front of the U.S. Embassy in Saigon killing 22 people, including 2 Americans.

The Soviet Union and the People's Republic of China signed an agreement allowing Soviet trains to travel through China to deliver economic and military aid to North Vietnam. However Mao Zedong rejected a request by Soviet leader Leonid Brezhnev to allow Soviets overflights through an air corridor for shipments.

The RAND Corporation publishes its first report on the war: Viet Cong Motivation and Morale in 1964 A Preliminary Report based on interviews with 145 VC POWs defectors and suspects between July and December 1964.

31 March-1 April

In Operation Quyet Thang 512 the ARVN 2nd Division planned to sweep a 200 square km area near Viet An. After US helicopter gunships hit the wrong target, the VC were able to shoot down a US Army troop carrying helicopter as it approached the landing zone. Anticipating the assault, the VC engaged the troops of the 5th Airborne Battalion as they landed and hit many of the helicopters. At 14:00, the 2nd and 3rd Battalions, 5th Infantry, and M113s began moving toward the besieged airborne. The 3rd Battalion and the M113s got within 2 km of the airborne when the commander ordered the infantry to secure a small hill instead, leaving the M113s to continue to the landing zone. Meanwhile, the VC forced the 2nd Battalion to fall back. A half hour later, five RVNAF A-1s arrived to assist the 2nd Battalion and the airborne. The VC, however, staged a fierce attack on the 3rd Battalion, assisted by ARVN artillery that mistakenly hit the infantry. The 3rd Battalion broke, with the VC chasing the soldiers into an open field where they were dangerously exposed. Earlier reports had led Westmoreland to invoke his emergency powers and at the critical moment, F–100s and B–57s zoomed in at low level and hit the VC, saving the 3rd Battalion from possible annihilation. Throughout the night, the VC probed the 5th Airborne's perimeter. At 05:00 on 1 April, they launched an assault that failed. They then faded back into the jungle. ARVN losses were 21 dead, 66 wounded, and 20 missing and 32 individual and two crew-served weapons. The US lost two dead and 19 wounded. The VC shot down two one Army and one Marine Corps helicopters and damaged all the others used in the operation. The allies found 70 VC dead and estimated that they lost an additional 270 men. Nineteen individual weapons and one 57 mm recoilless rifle were recovered.

== April ==
In North Vietnam President Ho Chi Minh decreed a new military service law. Enlistments were extended indefinitely for soldiers, previously discharged soldiers were recalled, and an increased number of young people were inducted into military service. During 1965, North Vietnam expanded the size of its army by 290,000 personnel and its self-defense militia from 1.4 million to 2.0 million.

1 April

Johnson authorized a change in the U.S. Marines' mission in South Vietnam, a month after the first units had been sent to protect installations at Da Nang from attack. For the first time, American ground troops were scheduled to move into the surrounding area and to engage PAVN/VC forces in combat.

1st Logistical Command was activated in Saigon to assume logistics support for the U.S. Army in II, III and IV Corps.

In Operation An Dan 137, a search and destroy mission against the VC 313th Local Force Company in Long An province, two infantry battalions, five Regional Forces Companies, and a Popular Forces company sought to trap the VC against the Oriental River. The Regional Forces company found 200 entrenched VC equipped with machine guns, 81 mm mortars, and a recoilless rifle at Binh Thanh hamlet. Deep mud and heavy fire stalled the attack, and despite airstrikes the ARVN were unable to progress and withdrew at 17:00. The next day 36 VC dead were found and 46 suspects were detained. Villagers reported that the VC had evacuated up to 40 dead and 30 wounded. ARVN losses were six dead and 12 wounded.

Two VC battalions attacked the 52nd Ranger Battalion at Đức Hòa district. The VC quickly overran one of the battalion's flanks. After a half hour, the VC assaulted the position's other flank, forcing the rangers to withdraw 500 meters. There, they made a stand with the help of airstrikes. The 35th Ranger Battalion was landed by US Army helicopters, with one UH-1 shot down and 19 damaged. US Army casualties were two dead and seven wounded. Helicopter gunship crews claimed they killed 29 VC and destroyed 17 structures.

3 April

The first jet-to-jet combat of the war took place when four U.S. Navy F-8E Crusaders from the USS Hancock were engaged by eight Vietnam People's Air Force (VPAF) MiG-17 fighters from the 921st Sao Do Regiment. One of the F-8Es was set on fire by cannons fired from a MiG-17 but was able to land safely at Da Nang. The VPAF claim to have shot down two F-8Es. In future years, 3 April would be a Vietnamese public holiday commemorated as "Air Force Day."

The VC attacked Phuoc Tan hamlet, 72 km northwest of Saigon. Following an all-day battle, the VC withdrew into Cambodia, losing 43 killed and MACV believed they had carried off another 60 casualties. ARVN losses were 14 dead, 20 wounded, and 18 missing. Allied aircraft had destroyed 150 of Phuoc Tan's 250 homes, most of the inhabitants had fled when the battle started, and MACV reported only one civilian death.

3 April – 11 November 1968

Operation Steel Tiger was a covert United States Air Force (USAF) 2nd Air Division, later Seventh Air Force and U.S. Navy Task Force 77 aerial interdiction effort targeted against the Ho Chi Minh Trail in southeastern Laos.

4 April

The USAF conducted its first airstrike on the Thanh Hóa Bridge, the raid failed to down the bridge and it would resist further attacks until finally being downed on 13 May 1972. Two USAF F-105 Thunderchief strike aircraft were shot down and both their pilots killed, the first aircraft lost in air-to-air combat by either side during the war. A USAF F-100 fighter escorting the strike aircraft scored the first probable USAF kill of the war shooting down a VPAF MiG-17.

A VC attack on a district town in An Xuyên province resulted in 25 VC killed and six weapons captured when a Regional Forces unit and a naval patrol counterattacked.

The 51st Ranger Battalion fought an all-day battle against two VC companies holding An Thanh and Lam Bac hamlets on Highway 19, 20 km northeast of Qui Nhon. VC losses were 42 killed, two captured and 17 weapons. The allies believed they may have killed an additional 64 VC that were evacuated. ARVN losses were ten killed and 13 wounded.

4–6 April

Operation Dan Chi 129 in the Mekong Delta killed 278 VC and six U.S. advisers and helicopter crewmen.

5 April

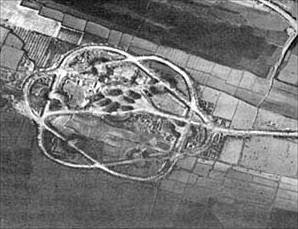
A North Vietnamese SA-2 site

A U.S. Navy RF-8 Crusader reconnaissance aircraft photographed an SA-2 Guideline surface-to-air missile (SAM) site under construction in North Vietnam for the first time. The discovery, 15 miles (24 km) southeast of Hanoi, "sent shivers down the spines of task force commanders and line aviators alike", a historian would note later, but official permission to attack a site so close to the capital would not be given "until the Navy and Air Force lost a few jets to the SA-2s".

6 April

The VC overran Lap Vo post in Vĩnh Long province, killing 14 Popular Forces soldiers and five civilians. The VC left behind four of their dead when they withdrew.

7 April

Johnson made a major televised speech at Johns Hopkins University. Johnson described the war as an attack by North Vietnam on South Vietnam. He proposed "unconditional discussions" to exchange views with interested parties in search of a peaceful solution, but offered no concessions. Johnson also proposed a massive program to develop the Mekong River basin which could include North Vietnam among the recipients of the Tennessee Valley Authority-type project. Ho Chi Minh responded that the United States must withdraw from South Vietnam as a condition for a peace agreement. The Johns Hopkins speech marked a change in American policy. Formerly, over a period of several years of escalating warfare in South Vietnam, the U.S. had refused to consider talking to the VC and North Vietnamese until the U.S. and South Vietnam had gained a military advantage.

Elements of the VC 2nd Regiment attacked the positions of the 2nd Vietnamese Marine Battalion at midnight. The Marines repulsed 10 attacks and the VC withdrew at dawn leaving 59 dead, 10 wounded and 71 weapons. Intelligence revealed that a further 70 VC dead and over 200 wounded were removed from the battlefield; VNMC losses were four killed.

7–9 April

A VC company attacked an outpost and New Life hamlet 12 km west of Tam Kỳ, killing four defenders and capturing 16 along with ten weapons. The VC returned to the outpost on the 9th and destroyed it.

In a five-hour battle, the VC prevented an engineer company that was advancing north from Hoài Nhơn from linking up with a marine company garrisoning An Thai on Highway 1. As the battle unfolded, the marines reinforced An Thai with two additional companies and a battalion headquarters. The fighting only ended when howitzers and US Army UH–1B gunships suppressed the VC at 16:00. At midnight on 7/8 April, the VC attacked An Thai and were repulsed by the Marines in repeated attacks lasting until 05:00 when they succeeded in penetrating the western perimeter, and slowly pushed the marines back from one house or foxhole to another. At dawn the marine commander launched a counterattack using troops from the relatively quiet southeastern perimeter. The rest of the battalion joined in, and, by 07:00, the VC were in retreat. The VC attacked once more at 04:00 on 9 April. This time, they came from the south, using two companies backed by mortars probably to cover the withdrawal of the rest of their force. Marine losses were five dead, 36 wounded, and 20 missing. The VC lost 231 dead, 12 captured and six machine guns, a mortar, and 105 individual weapons. Half the prisoners were recently infiltrated Northerners. The other half were Southerners, who claimed that they had received just 15 days of training.

8 April

North Vietnamese Prime Minister Phạm Văn Đồng responded to Johnson's proposal for peace negotiations by announcing North Vietnam's Four Points peace formula: withdrawal of all U.S. forces from South Vietnam, neutralization of both Vietnams pending reunification, adoption of the program of the National Liberation Front [VC] for internal affairs, and reunification without foreign interference.

A mutiny by 20 young officers ousted Admiral Chung Tấn Cang as commander of the Republic of Vietnam Navy in an action "that evidently had the government's blessing". The military junta governing South Vietnam did not order a response, and one U.S. official commented that Cang, an associate of recently ousted President Nguyen Khanh, "has been a thorn in our side", because of his lack of cooperation in moving military supplies.

Two U.S. Navy F-4B Phantom fighters flew into Chinese airspace and were tracked by radar flying over the Yulin Naval Base on Hainan Island, but departed before the Chinese military could respond to an alert.

9 April

At a CINCPAC meeting in Hawaii, the planners recommended the deployment of two brigades to South Vietnam. One would be stationed at Biên Hòa near Saigon to protect Bien Hoa Air Base; the other would go to Nha Trang to prepare for the introduction of a full division of U.S. troops. Ambassador Taylor had not been present at the meeting and he protested that "Recent actions relating to the introduction of U.S. ground forces have tended to create an eagerness in some quarters to deploy forces into SVN which I find difficult to understand." Taylor opposed the introduction of American ground troops for offensive operations, believing they should be restricted to coastal "enclaves". General Westmoreland disagreed, believing that enclaves were "an inglorious, static use of U.S. forces....that would leave the decision of when and where to strike to the enemy."

Two groups of four U.S. Navy F-4Bs, flew over Hainan Island. This time, a squadron of four Jian-5 jet fighters from the People's Liberation Army Air Force (PLAAF) intercepted them, with instructions not to fire unless fired upon. The American pilots stated that they had believed that they were outside China's airspace and in an area 36 miles (58 km) southwest of Hainan, while China accused the U.S. of trying to provoke a war.

The VC overran an outpost in Kiến Tường. When relief forces arrived, they found four survivors, while the other 51 Popular Forces soldiers in the garrison were missing along with their rifles and a 60 mm mortar.

10–12 April

The allies launched a regiment-sized air assault into War Zone D. ARVN losses were three dead and 16 wounded. VC losses were 15 killed. The ARVN captured 230 tons of rice, 880 gallons of gasoline, and 700,000 rounds of small arms ammunition.

10–14 April

On 10 April Task Force Alpha of 2nd Battalion, 3rd Marines was landed by helicopter from Danang Air Base to secure Phu Bai airfield and the surrounding area. On 13 April a detachment of ten UH-34D helicopters from HMM-162 was established at Phu Bai. On 14 April Battalion Landing Team 3rd Battalion, 4th Marines replaced Task Force Alpha at Phu Bai.

11 April

Westmoreland gave the Marines a phased blueprint for future operations. In the first and current phase, the Marines would defend their perimeter at Danang. In the second phase, they would patrol the approaches to the base in greater depth. In the third, they could come to the aid of South Vietnamese troops via helicopter up to 80 km from Danang. In the fourth phase, the Marines could operate offensively anywhere in I Corps.

13 April

Johnson met with the Joint Chiefs. After telling them that the US needed "to win the game in South Vietnam," he directed them once again to "start killing more Viet Cong." However, he refused to consider deploying three US divisions as requested to avoid provoking an overt North Vietnamese or Chinese invasion, and because he doubted he could get Congress to agree to it.

A VC battalion attempted to ambush three ARVN 1st Division battalions along Highway 1 at the border of Quang Tri and Thua Thien Provinces. Forewarned, the ARVN avoided the trap but lost the initiative by waiting for air and artillery strikes to have an impact on the VC. The strength of the VC positions, communication difficulties, and several incidents in which a US Army gunship, an American jet, and a Vietnamese M113 fired on friendly troops complicated the situation. In the daylong action, VC forces killed eight ARVN and wounded 37 and destroyed two M113s. Allied air and artillery fire reportedly killed 30 civilians and destroyed 74 houses. Five VC bodies were found and residents reported that the VC had carried off another 40 dead.

14 April

The U.S. and South Vietnam began "Operation Fact Sheet", a psychological warfare aerial mission, dropping over two million notices on those cities in North Vietnam with military facilities. The paper leaflets carried different types of messages written in the Vietnamese language. Some of them warned civilians to stay away from the areas that were to be bombed, and others suggested that civilians "could end the bombings by turning against their government", or advocated the benefits of moving to South Vietnam. During April, May and June, nearly 25 million papers were dropped. "The leaflets had no effect on North Vietnamese strategy", an author would note later, "but they did result in a few civilians moving away from military facilities".

15 April

VC Le Dua aka Le Van Dau was executed by firing squad at Da Nang stadium for the attempted bombing of the Grand Hotel.

Two infantry battalions from the 41st Infantry, an armored cavalry troop, and two scout companies attacked the VC 801st Battalion near Dai Khoang village, 10 km northwest of Phù Cát district. VC losses were 106 killed and three captured. ARVN losses were seven dead and 20 wounded.

After intelligence pinpointed the location of COSVN headquarters a massive aerial bombardment was launched against the location, involving 230 RVNAF and US aircraft, dropping 860 tons of bombs. The following day, three battalions were landed by helicopters at the site. They found an extensive tunnel complex, a communications center, more than 100 structures and two tons of rice, but no VC.

16 April

Life magazine published as its cover story the photo-essay "One ride with Yankee Papa 13" by Larry Burrows documenting a helicopter mission on 31 March.

17 April

In Washington, D.C. about 20,000 people gathered to protest the war organized by the Students for a Democratic Society (SDS). This was the first large protest against the war in the United States. At the same time, a counter-protest of about 100 people took place across the street, and a group of students representing the University of Wisconsin presented National Security Adviser McGeorge Bundy with a petition of support for the war, signed by 6,000 faculty and students.

China rescinded the order to the PLAAF to not attack American war planes violating Chinese air space. Over the next three years, 12 American war planes and several reconnaissance planes were shot down over China.

18–19 April

The ARVN 2nd Division massed six battalions and six platoons of artillery backed by aircraft to target the headquarters of the VC 1st Regiment, four infantry battalions, and an artillery company in the Viet An area of Quang Tin province. Two columns moved southwest from Thang Binh district town into the hilly piedmont. The southern axis met stiff and mounting resistance by an estimated two battalions deployed on three hills. After a series of airstrikes, a company from the 3rd Marine Battalion made a lodgment on one of the hills while the rest of the battalion and two troops of M113s swept around the VC southern flank and hit the main position on a second knoll. Considerable amounts of bloody clothing found near the combat hamlet of Thanh Yen supported villager reports that the airstrikes had killed about 150 VC. The ARVN spent the night on the battlefield. On the following afternoon an observation aircraft reported seeing VC moving further west toward the hamlet of Chien Son. After a brief artillery bombardment, the 3rd Marine Battalion and the two cavalry troops advanced in line across a field toward the hamlet. At 17:25, the VC unleashed a bombardment including heavy 4.2 inch mortars. Surprised by the large explosions the M113s turned about and drove off the battlefield, causing the marines to panic and flee. Friendly artillery stopped firing, and the USAF forward air controller on the scene was unable to persuade two RVNAF A-1s on station to attack. The Marine officers and their advisers could not stop the rout, but they did manage to steer the mob toward an abandoned VC trench where the marines stopped to take shelter. Here, allied officers organized a defense. The respite was brief as VC troops adjusted their bombardment to hit the new position, and a large column maneuvered to attack. Four advisers fell wounded, and, despite the best efforts of the remaining officers and advisers, the marines broke again. The division headquarters again rejected calls for artillery support on the supposition that the VC was too close to the marines, but the commander of the 2nd Division, General Hoàng Xuân Lãm, ordered a ranger battalion and an infantry battalion to come to their aid. That plan backfired when the panic that infected the marines spread to the new battalions, which quickly joined the rout. The debacle cost the allies 26 dead, 86 wounded, 28 missing, and eight crew-served and 25 individual weapons lost. The allies counted 53 VC dead and estimated they had killed 297 more, but MACV considered the latter number highly speculative.

19 April

A VC suicide bomber blew himself up on the dance floor of the Dalat Flower Night Club in Ban Me Thuot. The blast killed 14 Vietnamese and wounded 34 Vietnamese and four US soldiers.

19–20 April

The 41st Infantry attacked two VC companies 16 km north of Qui Nhon. VC losses were 73 killed and captured 23 captured along with 16 weapons. ARVN losses were five killed and 19 wounded. Ten Americans were killed, including eight killed when VC .50-caliber machine guns shot down two US Army helicopters.

20 April

At a meeting of American military and political leaders in Honolulu, Taylor successfully proposed that the U.S. adopt what he called the "enclave strategy" in its conduct of the war. McNamara and Assistant Secretary John McNaughton, CIA analyst William Bundy, Westmoreland, U.S. Navy Admiral U. S. Grant Sharp Jr. and the Joint Chiefs of Staff Chairman, General Earle Wheeler concurred in the proposal, which was adopted by Johnson. Taylor's idea was to limit U.S. ground operations to within a 50 miles (80 km) radius of important areas in important coastal areas, and with the ARVN to conduct counter-insurgency operations in the surrounding territory. The strategy would prove unsuccessful, leading to Taylor's resignation and a switch to a "search and destroy" operation in June. In a memo to the president the next day, McNamara described the military consensus that "it would take more than six months, perhaps a year or two to...break the will of the DRV/VC [PAVN/VC] by denying them victory." On this date the U.S. had 33,000 U.S. military personnel in Vietnam and another 20,000 scheduled to be there.

22 April

McNamara told reporters that he would not rule out the use of nuclear weapons in the war, as part of a press conference given under the condition that the reporters not attribute his remarks to him, nor quote him verbatim. Tom Wicker of The New York Times took notes and paraphrased the statement, in which McNamara said "We are not following a strategy that recognizes any sanctuary or any weapons restriction. But we would use nuclear weapons only after fully applying non-nuclear arsenal. In other words, if 100 planes couldn't take out a target... we would try 200 planes, and so on. But 'inhibitions' on using nuclear weapons are not overwhelming." Wicker's report noted that "High officials" in the Johnson administration "emphasize that it is 'inconceivable' that nuclear weapons would be used in the present circumstances of the war. They do not rule out the possibility that circumstances might arise in which nuclear weapons have to be used." Nikolai T. Fedorenko, the Soviet Ambassador to the United Nations, sharply criticized McNamara and the U.S. in a speech the day after the report, commenting that "See the statement made today by Mr. McNamara... The United States is not averse to utilizing — this time perhaps as tactical weapons - nuclear warheads against the people of an Asian country as they have done once before, covering themselves with indelible shame for centuries to come. Mr. McNamara clearly reserved the right to unleash nuclear war in Vietnam."

A Marine reconnaissance company was fired on by a VC unit, the Marines returned fire and killed one VC.

23 April

Taylor reported to Washington that Prime Minister Quat was reluctant to accept the assignment of more U.S. soldiers to South Vietnam.

USAF Lieutenant Colonel James Robinson Risner commander of the 67th Tactical Fighter Squadron is featured on the cover of Time magazine. On 15 September Risner's F-105 was shot down over North Vietnam and he was captured and held as a prisoner of war until 12 February 1973.

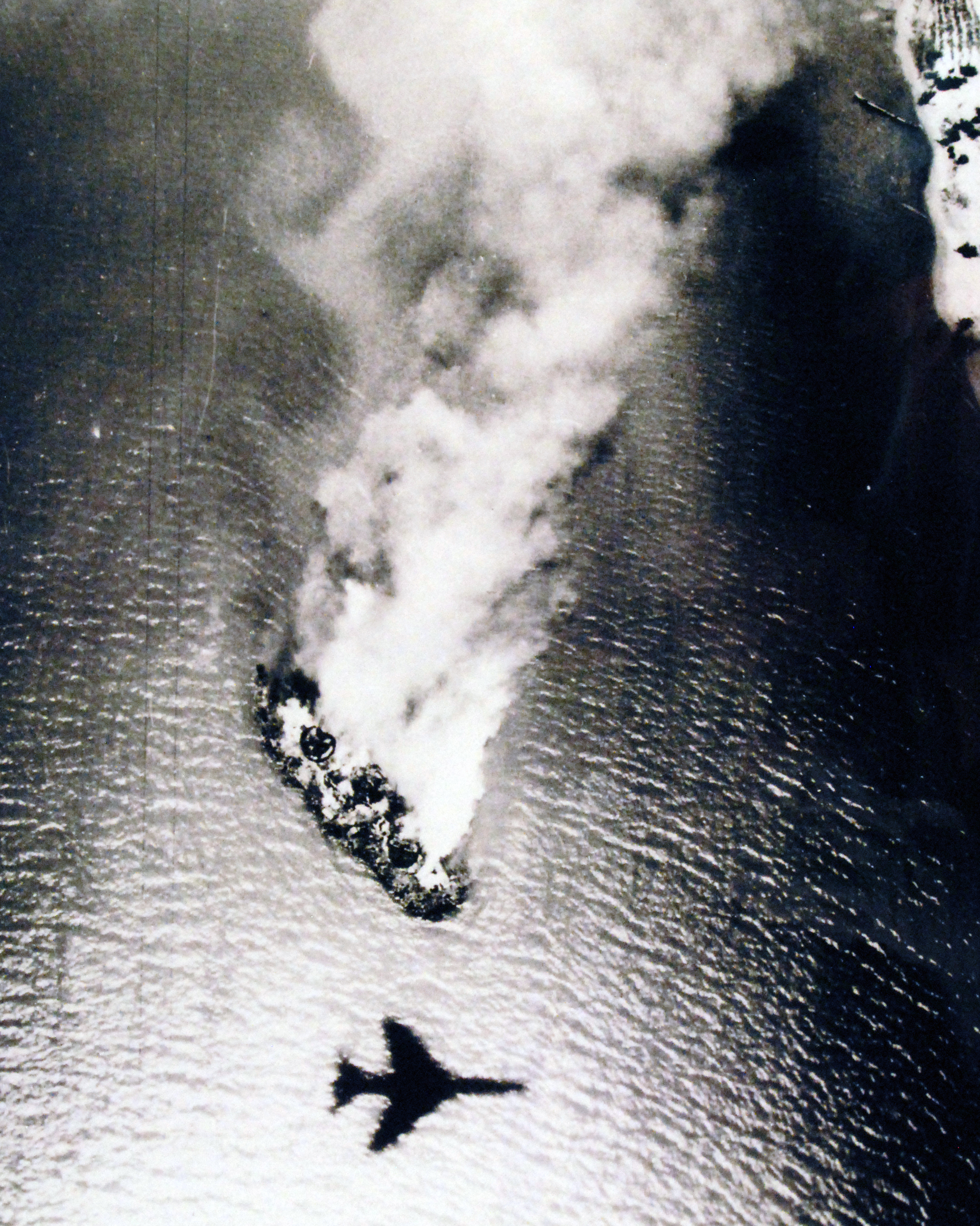
Post-strike reconnaissance of a burning Vietnam People's Navy torpedo boat, one of five destroyed by U.S. Navy jets on 28 April

23–24 April

The VC overran a 33-man Popular Forces post at Thanh Ha, Long An province. The VC killed 16 of the defenders, wounded seven, and captured a 60 mm mortar, four Browning automatic rifles, and 19 individual weapons.

26 April

During the relocation of US Special Forces Detachment A–233 and its associated Strikers from Buon Mi Ga to Buon Ea Yang in Darlac province, a 1,400-person convoy departed Buon Mi Ga on 25 April. As the column approached the deserted hamlet of Phuoc Trach, 22 km west of Buon Mi Ga. Scouts detected two VC companies lying in ambush on a hill overlooking the road. The Strikers killed 32 VC while losing four dead and 13 wounded.

26–27 April

Two CIDG companies from Camp Phuoc Vinh destroyed a VC depot in War Zone D. When they camped later that night, they set up an ambush that caught two VC companies by surprise. After they recovered from the initial setback, the VC launched two assaults on the camp. The second of these devolved into hand-to-hand fighting before the insurgents withdrew at 06:00 on the 27th. VC losses were 34 killed, four rifles, and a light machine gun captured. American advisors estimated the VC had carried off another 75 casualties. The Strikers lost two killed and five wounded.

28 April

Johnson met with FBI Director J. Edgar Hoover and noted that, according to U.S. intelligence reports, American protests against the war were part of a strategy of China, North Vietnam and the American members of the "New Left"; with the goal that "intensified antiwar agitation in the United States would eventually create a traumatic domestic crisis leading to a complete breakdown in law and order" and that "U.S. troops would have to be withdrawn from Vietnam in order to restore domestic tranquility."

Companies E and F, 2/3rd Marines participated in the first coordinated ground operation with ARVN forces.

The VC 506th Battalion, backed by local forces, overran So Do, a post manned by a ranger company and a small Popular Forces detachment, 3 km northwest of Bao Tri. ARVN losses were 35 dead, 16 wounded, one missing, and 51 weapons lost. In coordination with the assault, mortars hit Bao Tri's Chieu Hoi center, inflicting 37 casualties, and a 57 mm recoilless rifle sunk a landing craft 9 km west of So Do, killing one and wounding four.

28 April-5 May

ARVN forces launched Operation Tien Giang 19/65, an amphibious and airborne operation against a VC logistics area in Thạnh Phú district. On 30 April a supply cache was found that included 338 rifles and submachine guns, 21 antiaircraft machine guns, four mortars, six flamethrowers, and 579 rounds of 70 mm. howitzer ammunition. The operation resulted in 220 VC killed, 48 captured, 76 suspects detained and 410 weapons, 17 tons of ammunition, and one ton of explosives. ARVN losses were seven dead and 25 wounded. Hostile fire wounded a US Army pilot and damaged six helicopters.

29 April

Australian Prime Minister Robert Menzies informed the Parliament in Canberra that he was sending the 1st Battalion, Royal Australian Regiment (1 RAR) to fight in the war, at the request of the Premier of South Vietnam. The day before, after the news of the government's plans had been published to the press, Menzies cabled the Australian Embassy in Saigon to stress the urgent need for South Vietnam to actually send a request, and during Thursday, Ambassador H. D. Anderson and his staff had to speak to the Vietnamese Premier, Phan Huy Quát, to ask him to invite Australia to enter the war. The cable from Premier Quát was not received by Menzies until 5:36 p.m. two and a half hours before Menzies was scheduled to speak to Parliament.

Captain Charles Shelton was shot down and captured by the Pathet Lao. He would be listed as a prisoner of war by the United States Department of Defense until 20 September 1994 making him the last American classified as a prisoner from the war.

30 April

The CIA warned in a memorandum that the introduction of U.S. ground forces into Vietnam might result in "constant danger that the war weary people of South Vietnam will let the U.S. assume an even greater share of the fighting.

The VC launched a series of attacks along the Cambodian border. In Kien Tuong, the VC attacked 35 Popular Forces soldiers guarding a village headquarters, killing four, wounding nine, and capturing 16 weapons. The VC attacked three posts simultaneously in Chau Doc Province. Two of the positions rebuffed the VC without lost. However, at camp An Phu the VC massed 400 soldiers, an 81 mm mortar, four 60 mm mortars, and three 57 mm recoilless rifles against 70 Hòa Hảo Strikers. The battle began at 01:00, the VC breached the outer perimeter but could not break the defenders, who, for six hours, repulsed repeated assaults. The VC withdrew to Cambodia when a company-sized relief force arrived at 07:15. The VC left behind one body, but residents reported seeing the VC carry away about 60 bodies. The garrison's losses were 16 dead, 14 wounded and three missing.

CIDG Strikers at the Phu Hiep special forces post 160 km west of Saigon successfully repulsed an early morning attack backed by mortars and recoilless rifles. The Strikers lost 16 killed, 14 wounded, and three missing. Villagers reported seeing 70 VC dead.

Late April

U.S. Army Chief of Staff General Johnson lunched with Vietnam expert and author Bernard Fall in Washington. Johnson said that, "As a result of my discussions with Dr. Fall, I conclude that I am the victim of appreciable misinformation concerning cliques, claques, and the variety of outlooks and objectives of the diverse elements that comprise the population of Vietnam."

In his search for more reliable information about Vietnam, in June, Johnson appointed a team of military officers to develop "new sources of action to be taken in South Vietnam by the United States and its allies, which, will, in conjunction with current actions, lead in due time to successful accomplishment of US aims and objectives." What came to be called "A Program for the Pacification and Long-Term Development of South Vietnam" (PROVN) would be completed on 1 March 1966.

== May ==
3 May

An article in Newsweek magazine prompted the breaking of diplomatic relations by Cambodia with the United States. Prince Norodom Sihanouk cited a report about his mother, Queen Kossamak, that had accused her of involvement in "various money-making schemes".

4 May

Johnson requested an additional appropriation of $700 million for the war during the remainder of the fiscal year. The request was approved by Congress two days later. Johnson indicated that he might have to request additional funds.

The VC seized the coastal hamlet of Thein Nghiep in Binh Thuan province. A Regional Forces company sent to investigate halted at 09:30 when it came upon a roadblock manned by two VC companies on the Phan Thiết-Hai Long Highway, about 7 km east of Phan Thiết. Binh Thuan's province chief dispatched the understrength 1st Battalion, 47th Infantry, two Regional Forces companies and two M8 armored cars. After an airstrike hit the roadblock at 10:30, a USAF forward air controller reported that up to 500 VC were digging in on a hill overlooking the highway. After several hours of airstrikes, at 17:30, as the South Vietnamese commander launched his two M8s toward the roadblock. Meant as a distraction, they smashed through the obstacle. Then, with the assistance of a Regional Forces company, the M8s pursued the VC, killing about 30. The rout spread alarm through the rest of the VC, just as the 1st Battalion launched their assault and, by nightfall, the VC were in full flight. The allies counted 64 bodies, including a company commander, and captured seven weapons and ten prisoners, including another company commander and a political officer. They estimated that the VC had carried off another 50 dead. ARVN losses were six dead and 16 wounded.

5 May

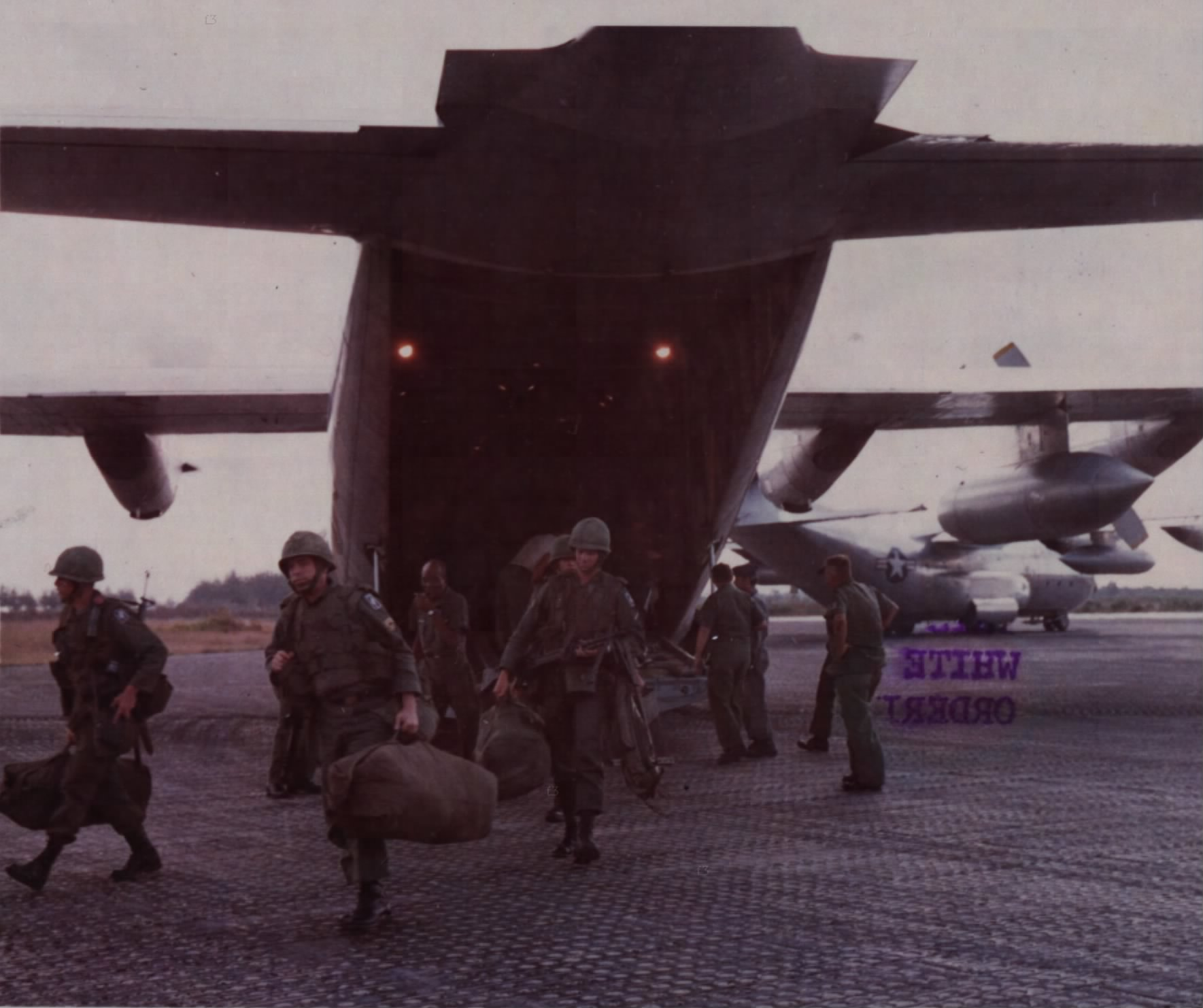
173rd Airborne Brigade soldiers arrive at Bien Hoa Air Base

Soldiers from the 173rd Airborne Brigade arrived in South Vietnam. The brigade would be responsible for providing security to Bien Hoa Air Base and the port of Vung Tau, both near Saigon. This was the first combat unit from the U.S. Army to arrive in South Vietnam.

Forty male students at the University of California, Berkeley stood in front of the city's draft board office and burned their draft cards, introducing what would become a common form of antiwar protest and a refusal to join the war effort. The 40 UC students were among hundreds who marched to the draft board after a noon rally on the Berkeley campus. "While Berkeley police photographers snapped their photos," an Associated Press report noted, "the students squatted in a huddle like a football team and placed their burning cards in a small pile". Although future draft-card burnings would be made in opposition to the war, the initial protest was against the U.S. intervention in the Dominican Civil War.

The VC ambushed a supply convoy on Highway 1, 35 km south of Danang. Three soldiers suffered wounds and three went missing, and six VC were killed.

As 81 mm mortars bombarded Cần Giờ district town, VC overran two Popular Forces posts nearby, one manned by 15 soldiers and the other garrisoned by eight. The VC killed or wounded all the defenders.

In Long Khanh, the VC attacked a Regional Forces company that was guarding a power line along Highway 20, burnt a truck, and fired into a New Life hamlet. They then ambushed a relief force consisting of two Regional Forces platoons and three armored cars. The VC killed 14 ARVN, wounded seven, and captured eight. They destroyed two of the armored cars and damaged two trucks. They also captured three machine guns, 13 individual weapons, and 100,000 piastres.

5–7 May

A ranger battalion swept part of the Tuy Phước district. VC losses were 47 killed, 43 captured, 16 suspects detained and ten weapons captured. It was estimated that the VC had evacuated as many as 100 more casualties.

6 May

The Armed Forces Council of South Vietnam under General Thiệu dissolved itself leaving in nominal control of the country the civilian Prime Minister Quat.

III Marine Expeditionary Force established its headquarters at Da Nang Air Base.

A Regional Forces company guarding a bridge on Highway 1, 40 km south of Danang repulsed an attack, killing 15 VC and capturing seven weapons. ARVN losses were five dead and three wounded.

6–9 May

More than 1,000 VC overran an outpost and bombarded the Hòa Hảo headquarters at Binh Hung in the Hai Yen Special Zone, An Xuyen province. The VC then ambushed several small relief columns as mortars hit the Cau Mau airfield to prevent the dispatch of additional reinforcements. After dark, the VC stormed Binh Hung, but the defenders held. South Vietnamese military and civilian casualties exceeded 100. On 9 May a smaller VC force, backed by mortars, recoilless rifles, and 75 mm howitzers, unsuccessfully attacked Binh Hung again. MACV reported that allied forces had killed more than 100 VC in the two engagements.

7 May

Marine forces land at Chu Lai to secure the area for construction of an air base.

After receiving congressional approval for more funding for South Vietnam, Johnson said: "It is not the money but the message that matters. And that message is simple—that message is clear: We will do whatever must be done to ensure the safety of South Vietnam from aggression. We will use our power with restraint and with all the wisdom we can command. But we will use it... Once this message is clearly understood by all, there will be greater hope for peace."

8–10 May

After intelligence indicated that a VC battalion and an arms depot was located about 10 km northwest of Thủ Dầu Một, the ARVN launched an air assault by two battalions of the 9th Infantry against the depot. A VC .50-caliber machine gun shot down a CH–34 carrying intelligence personnel and two defectors who were to lead the soldiers to the target killing all onboard. The 9th Infantry failed to find the weapons depot, but killed two VC, captured 75,000 piastres, and destroyed up to 30 tons of rice before linking up with another battalion that had advanced by land. The three battalions set up a perimeter for the night near the Saigon River. The next morning, the three battalions set out in nine company columns, each spaced 50 meters apart in dense jungle. As they advanced, the troops received an increasing amount of fire and adopted a defensive position at midday. The 5th Division commander refused reinforcements, judging the situation too dangerous and instead air and artillery strikes were maintained around the perimeter. When the VC attacked, many of the ARVN fled in disorder, including the regimental commander, whom the government had decorated 13 times for bravery, joined the stampede. The rout left just 200 ARVN, many of whom were wounded, and 16 U.S. advisers to face the VC. The remaining soldiers established a perimeter about 1 km west of the original position. Bowing to US pressure, the 5th Division commander agreed to a rare nighttime airmobile assault, with US helicopters delivering a fresh battalion at 20:00. The defenders faced nothing more than harassing fire through the night. At 07:00 on the tenth, helicopters delivered an airborne battalion to reinforce the survivors and to facilitate their extraction later that day. The fiasco cost the ARVN 32 dead, 122 wounded, 36 missing, a helicopter, plus nearly 100 weapons. The US Army suffered two dead and three wounded. VC losses were four killed with three soldiers and four weapons captured.

9 May – 1 June

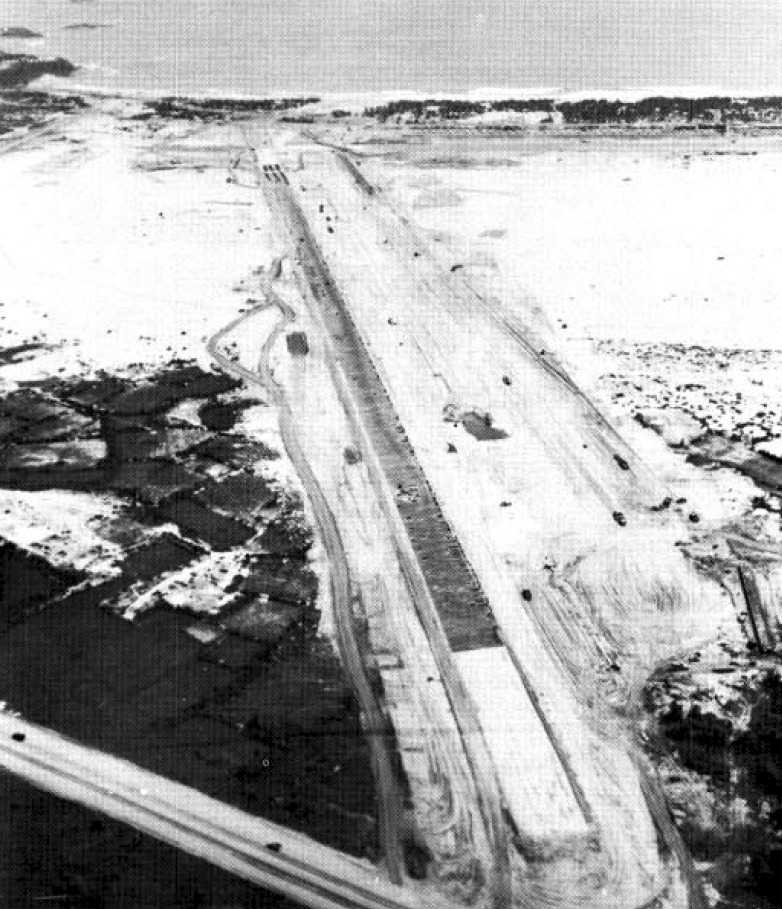
Chu Lai Air Base under construction

Construction began on what would become the Chu Lai Air Base in South Vietnam, as a unit of the U.S. Naval Mobile Construction Battalion, NMCB-10, began the task of putting in the first combat zone "Short Airfield for Tactical Support" (SATS). The team would have a 4,000 feet (1,200 m) runway in place within 23 days and the first airplanes A-4 Skyhawks from VMA-225 and VMA-311 would land on 1 June and launched their first airstrike later that day.

10–12 May

In the Battle of Song Be the VC overran the capital city of Phước Long Province, about 60 miles (97 km) north of Saigon. The town was recaptured by the ARVN with US air support. The battle resulted in 297 VC, 58 ARVN and five U.S. killed.

13–14 May

The ARVN 21st Division was operating in Bạc Liêu province, when a US Army observation plane spotted 50 VC about 60 km to the east at Thanh Thoi An hamlet, 18 km southeast of Soc Trang. A US helicopter gunship platoon and a command-and-control helicopter investigating the area received heavy fire from the preferred landing zone. The first unit of the 42nd Ranger Battalion was landed at an alternate landing zone and quickly came under attack. Throughout the afternoon, US helicopters delivered the rest of the 42nd Rangers, two understrength battalions of the 33rd Infantry, the 21st Division's reconnaissance company, and a 4.2-inch mortar platoon. When part of the VC line collapsed, the rangers poured a devastating fire on the fleeing soldiers from close range. The remaining VC held their ground until 22:00, when they finally cracked under assault. A full moon and a clear sky allowed aircraft to harry the VC as they ran through the open paddies. The pursuit continued until 02:00 on the 14th. VC losses were 174 killed, nine captured and a mortar, a recoilless rifle, two machine guns, four automatic rifles, and 56 individual firearms. ARVN losses were 17 killed and 41 wounded. Five Americans were injured, and four gunships suffered damage.

13–18 May

Johnson halted the bombing of North Vietnam under Operation Rolling Thunder in an attempt to induce the North Vietnamese to negotiate a peace agreement. North Vietnam instead said the bombing halt was only "an effort to camouflage American intensification of the war."

15 May

After seizing several hamlets in northeastern III Corps, the newly raised VC 274th Regiment ambushed a Regional Forces convoy on Highway 20 in Long Khanh province. To keep rescue forces at bay, the VC deployed blocking forces and bombarded the nearby district town of Định Quán. Only allied aircraft were able to lend support to the stricken convoy. The VC destroyed 14 vehicles, killed 45 ARVN, and wounded 25. Ten soldiers went missing and the VC captured a mortar, three machine guns, and 89 small arms. Two American advisors were killed.

16 May

Ho Chi Minh met with Chinese leader Mao Zedong in China. Ho said that North Vietnam would "take the main burden of the war by themselves" but requested additional Chinese economic and military support. Mao agreed and they set the ground rules for Chinese assistance: North Vietnamese would fight the war with Chinese logistical help, but the Chinese would not intervene militarily unless the United States invaded North Vietnam. Chinese assistance to North Vietnam took three forms: engineers and laborers to build and maintain defense works, airfields and roads, anti-aircraft personnel to defend North Vietnam from air attacks, and military equipment. The total number of Chinese stationed in North Vietnam and dedicated to these tasks was about 160,000 with the first tranche arriving in May 1965.

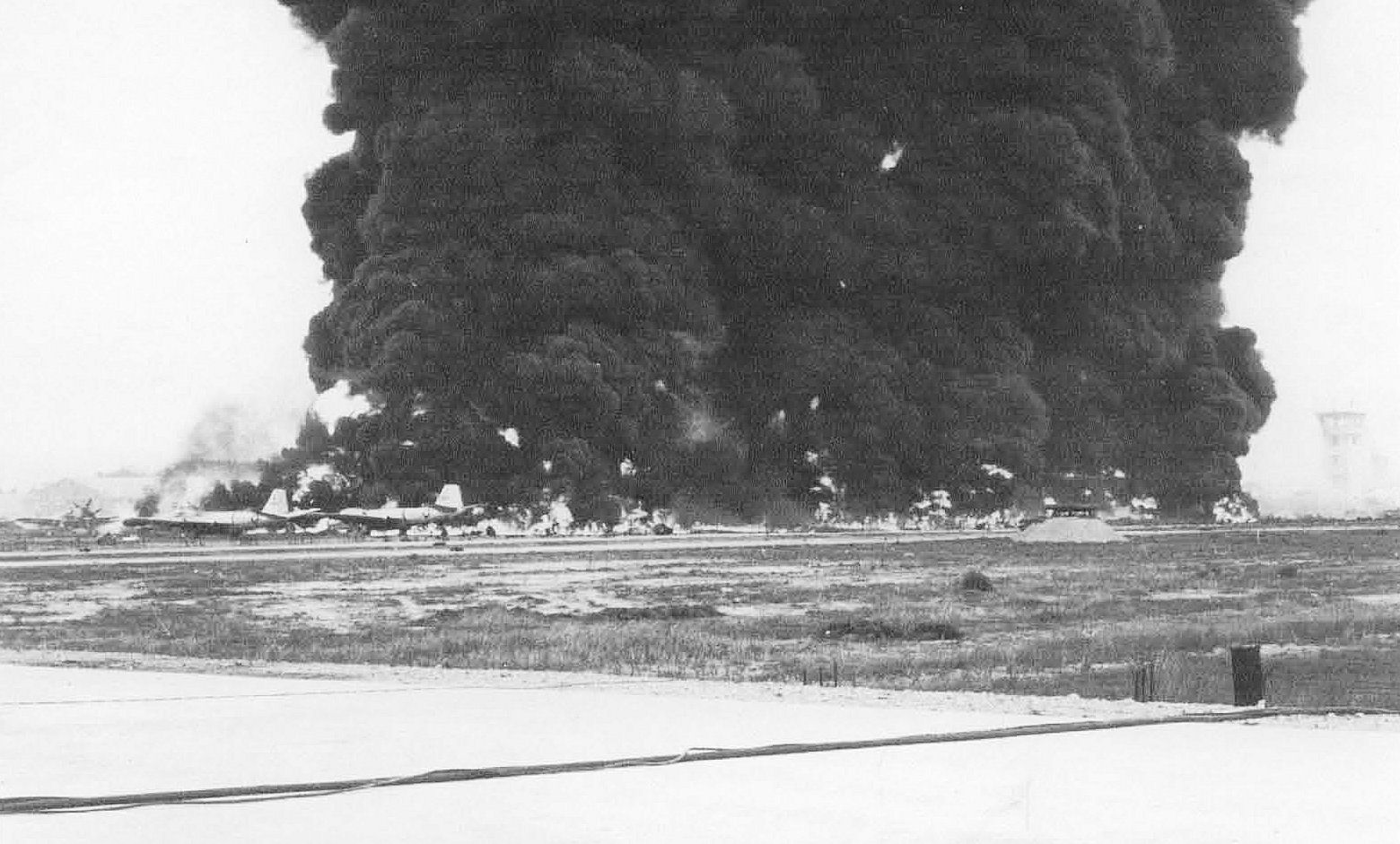
Burning aircraft on ramp at Bien Hoa Air Base

Twenty-eight USAF airmen and eight RVNAF were killed in an accidental explosion at Bien Hoa Air Base. Thirteen airplanes were destroyed and 25 damaged.

Following reports on the location of two VC companies in Darlac, 350 Strikers and two Regional Forces platoons made night march from Camp Buon Ea Yang to surprise the VC at dawn on the sixteenth. VC losses were 39 killed, 13 captured and 16 weapons captured. One Striker died in the raid.

17 May

Presidential adviser and future Secretary of Defense Clark Clifford in a letter to President Johnson said, "I believe our ground forces in South Vietnam should be kept to a minimum, consistent with the protection of our installations and property in that country ... This could be a quagmire. It could turn into an open end commitment on our part that would take more and more ground troops, without a realistic hope of ultimate victory."

Four hundred VC attacked Phu Long village, 7 km north of Phan Thiết inflicting 60 casualties on the defenders.

18 May

Five Regional Forces companies struck a VC camp near Xuan My, 48 km south of Da Nang, killing 57 VC, capturing 20 and seizing seven rifles.

20 May

A few officers and around 40 civilians, predominantly Catholic, were arrested on charges of attempting to assassinate Quát and kidnap Kỳ among others. Several of the arrested were known supporters of Thảo and believed to be abetting him in evading the authorities.

22 May

A VC battalion ambushed two CIDG platoons as they crossed a field after returning from an operation near Bến Cát. The attack killed 54 Strikers and wounded 11, with six soldiers missing and 69 weapons lost. One US advisor was also killed.

22–3 May

In Quang Nam province, an infantry battalion and three Regional Forces companies made a night march to surprise a VC company at dawn, killing 45 and capturing ten and three weapons while losing one soldier killed.

23 May

Senator Ernest Gruening called for an investigation into the situation in South Vietnam and for U.S. forces to be withdrawn. Gruening and Wayne Morse were the only two senators to vote against the Gulf of Tonkin Resolution.

Due to VC harassment of the Khai Quang outpost in An Xuyen province, the 3rd Battalion, 32nd Infantry was sent to relieve the post. The battalion left a company at the post, and then began its march home when the VC ambushed it. ARVN losses were 36 killed, 42 wounded, 17 missing, and 51 weapons lost. One US adviser was killed.

26 May

Eight hundred soldiers of 1 RAR departed Australia on HMAS Sydney to be deployed to Biên Hòa.

The VC ambushed a jeep between the Ben Soi CIDG camp and Tay Ninh, killing one American, wounding a second, and capturing a third.

27 May

New Zealand Prime Minister Keith Holyoake announced in Parliament that 120 troops from the 16th Field Regiment, Royal New Zealand Artillery become the first of that nation's troops to be committed to the war. "Nothing will give Australian soldiers more satisfaction than to be in company with troops from New Zealand", Holyoake told the opening session of Parliament in Wellington.

The ARVN 21st Division's 33rd Infantry Regiment and the 43rd Ranger Battalion, a reconnaissance company, and an M113 troop encircled a VC battalion in Phong Dinh Province, 21 km northwest of Soc Trang. VC losses were 96 killed, and 26 captured and 29 weapons. ARVN losses were ten dead and 52 wounded. Meanwhile, to the northeast, the ARVN 7th Division massed a ranger and four infantry battalions, two reconnaissance companies, a mechanized troop, and a territorial company against two VC main force and one local force companies. In the fight that followed, the ARVN killed 40 VC and captured 30 suspects, three firearms, and a .50-caliber machine gun. ARVN losses were ten dead and 32 wounded.

I Corps mounted its largest airmobile operation to date as US Marine helicopters, escorted by US Army gunships, delivered two battalions to pin two VC companies against a river, 40 km south of Da Nang. The VC broke across open country to escape the trap, which allowed the gunships to hit them with rockets and machine guns. After arriving at its objective, the Vietnamese 3rd Marine Battalion reversed course and ran into enemy soldiers who had been trailing the unit. Flushed into the open, these insurgents fell victim to Army UH–1B gunships. By the time the operation ended, the allies had killed 93 VC and captured 30 and nine weapons. ARVN losses amounted to two dead and three wounded.

28–31

The Battle of Ba Gia in Quảng Ngãi Province began when the VC 1st Regiment, 2nd Division ambushed the ARVN 1st Battalion, 51st Regiment, 25th Division. ARVN losses were 107 killed and 367 captured or missing. VC losses were 84 killed and 24 weapons lost. MACV estimated that the VC may have suffered as many as 826 casualties

29 May

Sixty VC entered Dong Ha village in Cần Giờ district. They beheaded the village chief and four Popular Forces soldiers in front of the residents, burned the chief's house and the village community center, and confiscated rice from the population.

The VC assaulted a Regional Forces company outpost at Khe Tre, Thua Thien province, 56 km northwest of Da Nang. After a VC battalion captured the post, the ARVN 1st Division organized a reaction. The 1st Battalion, 3rd Infantry was landed at Nam Dong, 8 km south of Khe Tre and then began moving north. After splitting the battalion into two columns with half on the road and the other half advancing cross country, the offroad column soon fell behind those on the road, as the terrain was mountainous and choked with vegetation. At 13:30 the VC opened fire on the road column, popping out of spider holes placed 30 meters from the road. The lead South Vietnamese company broke into a run toward Khe Tre, abandoning the rest of the battalion. The battalion headquarters company also ran, this time toward Nam Dong. Left alone on the road to fend for themselves were the battalion commander and his two advisers. The two offroad companies also received fire. Although this fire was light, VC gunners managed to kill or wound both company commanders and several noncommissioned officers. Leaderless, the troops withdrew in disorder. US Army gunships attacked VC positions on overlooking ridge lines, but did not fire close to the ARVN for fear of hitting them. After the VC killed the battalion commander and wounded the senior adviser, the remnants dissolved. Early on 30 May the 3rd Battalion, 3rd Infantry and the elite Black Panther Company were landed at Nam Dong. They explored the VC's 1 km-long ambush position, finding no bodies. The ARVN had lost 29 dead, 26 wounded, including one American, and 30 missing. It also had lost 87 weapons.

29 May-2 June

On the 29th the VC ambushed two Popular Forces platoons in Định Tường province, killing seven and wounding three, with seven more soldiers missing. On the 30th mines killed five and wounded 38 ARVN in Gò Công province and wounded another 16 in Kiên Giang province. On 2 June, traitors helped the VC capture a post manned by 26 Popular Forces soldiers in An Xuyen. All but two of the garrison disappeared with their weapons.

31 May

CIDG troops from Gia Vuc in western Quang Ngai had hit a VC base. With the help of airstrikes, they killed 31 insurgents and destroyed 36 tons of rice, 481 structures, and 150 livestock.

Late May – 17 August

The PAVN besieged Đức Cơ Camp which was defended by the 5th Special Forces Group Detachment A-215 and Civilian Irregular Defense Group program (CIDG) forces. On 3 August a force of ARVN Paratroopers with Major Norman Schwarzkopf as senior military adviser was sent to relieve the camp. The paratroopers took heavy casualties and a second, larger force was required to relieve them. That force too came into heavy contact on 5 August. Schwarzkopf and his group fought continuously for several days. On 17 August additional ARVN forces supported by two battalions of the 173rd Airborne Brigade arrived and broke the siege.

== June ==
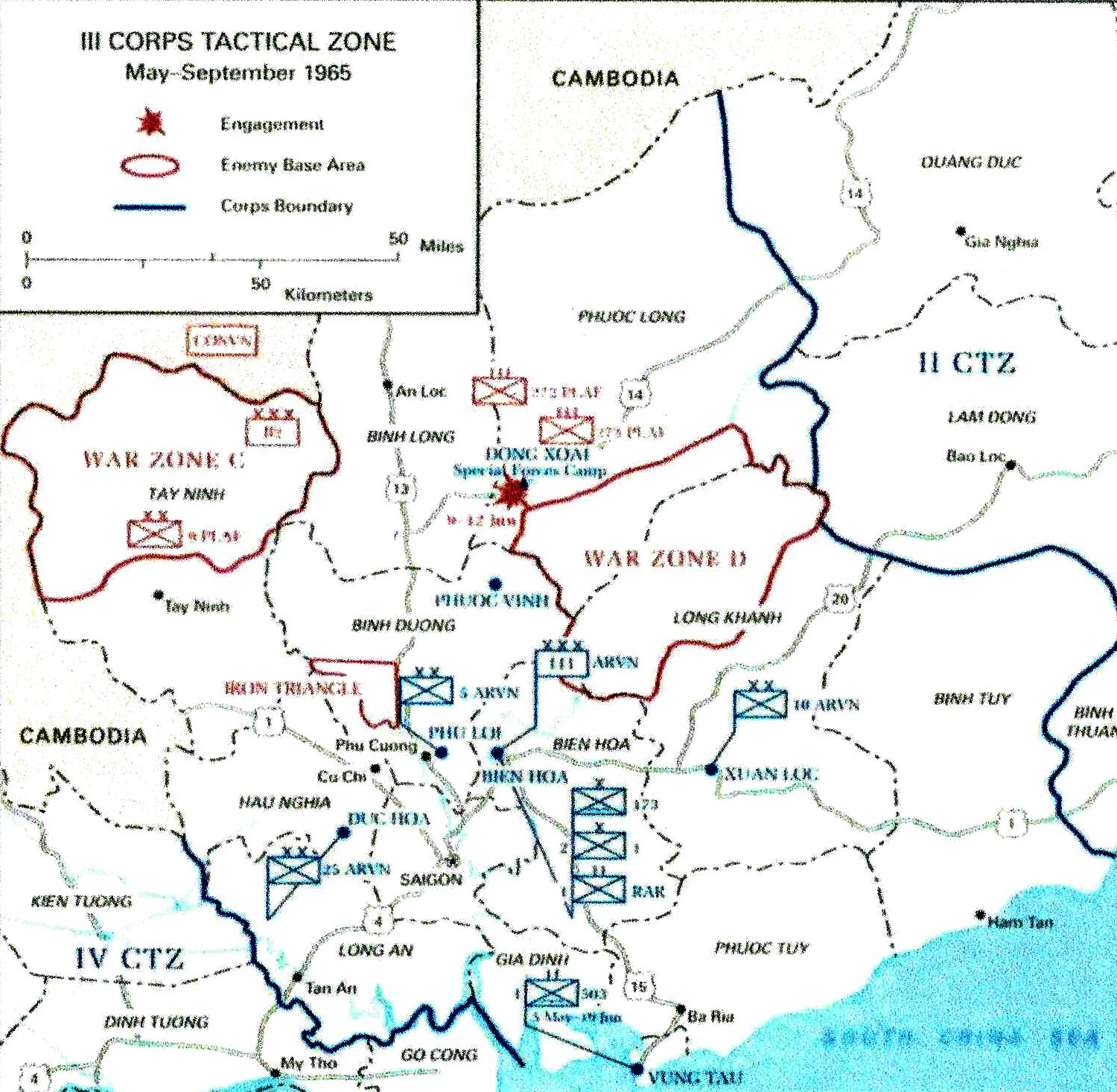
The III Corps tactical area, including Saigon, Biên Hòa, Zone D, and other sites of importance in the Vietnam War.

1 June

The PAVN 95th Regiment overran the headquarters of Le Thanh district, 63 km west of Pleiku. A convoy carrying a government delegation led by the province chief was heading to the town that day and was ambushed. The South Vietnamese and the six advisers accompanying them fought off the attack and finally received support from a rifle platoon from Pleiku. After losing two gunships to antiaircraft fire, a rescue force evacuated the wounded. The helicopters had to return to base because of the foul weather, and rather than remain behind to help the convoy, the CIDG soldiers departed with the helicopters. The survivors of the original convoy and the reinforcing rifle platoon started to march back to Pleiku. After learning that another platoon meant to reinforce the column had turned back in fear, the deputy province chief for security in Pleiku ignored US advice and loaded 30 clerks into trucks to help extract the convoy. At 17:00, the PAVN ambushed the relief convoy, destroying it. A half hour later, the PAVN again ambushed the original convoy, inflicting heavy casualties. ARVN losses were 63 dead, 23 wounded, and 19 missing along with 84 individual weapons, six crew-served weapons, and 16 trucks. Two Americans died, and two were wounded.

3 June

A battalion attacked Chau Hiep hamlet, a community of 1,700 people in western Gia Dinh province. The garrison, which numbered 80 Popular Forces soldiers, 63 rangers, and 36 Combat Youth, resisted the assault with air support. The South Vietnamese lost 15 killed, 53 wounded, and two missing many of whom were civilians.

The PAVN 18th Regiment ambushed the 1st Battalion, 40th Infantry, on Highway 7 between Cheo Reo and the Le Bac bridge. After the battalion retreated 1.5 km, the PAVN ambushed it again. The ARVN broke and fled in disorder. The battalion's wounded senior adviser called for medical evacuation for himself and two other injured Americans. Helicopter gunships covered the evacuation, then joined fixed-wing aircraft in bombarding the area for the rest of the day. South Vietnamese losses were described as heavy.

3–6 June

The 7th Division hunted the headquarters of the Dong Thap 1 Regiment in Cái Bè district in western Dinh Tuong province. Seven infantry battalions, three reconnaissance companies, three Regional Forces companies, and some M113s faced off against six VC main force companies. VC losses were 52 killed, four prisoners, nine firearms, and four antiaircraft machine guns captured. The allies estimated the VC evacuated another 200 casualties. ARVN losses were 12 dead and 51 wounded.

4–5 June

The ARVN 9th Division mounted an operation to reestablish government control in Vĩnh Long province's Cai Nhum District. One Regional Forces battalion and three army battalions advanced along canals from the south, while a fourth army battalion proceeded likewise from the north. The 23rd River Assault Group, with a fifth infantry battalion aboard, blocked potential escape routes. At 13:30, the 1st Battalion, 14th Infantry, which was advancing from the north, encountered a strong VC position near a hamlet. After airstrikes by four B–57s followed by US Army helicopter gunships, the soldiers fixed bayonets and charged the VC, capturing the position. The battalion then surrounded the hamlet overnight. VC losses were 46 killed and seven captured and 31 weapons. The ARVN estimated the VC had carried off another 53 casualties during the night. ARVN losses were four dead and five wounded.

5 June

The U.S. Navy began a permanent presence by one aircraft carrier at Dixie Station off the coast of South Vietnam.

Taylor telegraphed Washington to advise that the bombing campaign was not deterring the North Vietnamese and that ""it will probably be necessary to commit U.S. ground forces to action."

7 June

Westmoreland reported to the Joint Chiefs of Staff that the VC were stronger than ever and that ARVN was taking heavy casualties and suffering from a high rate of desertions and an unwillingness to take the offensive. Westmoreland said, "I see no course of action open to us except to reinforce our efforts in SVN with additional U.S. or third country forces as rapidly as is practical." He identified U.S. units that could be assigned to South Vietnam that would bring U.S. military strength in the country up to 44 combat battalions.

8 June

A US State Department spokesman, Robert J. McCloskey told a press conference "more or less offhandedly", that Westmoreland had been given presidential authorization to commit American ground troops to combat in support of ARVN missions. McCloskey specifically said that "I'm sure it's been made clear... that American forces would be available for combat support together with Vietnamese forces as and when necessary." The White House issued a carefully worded denial the next day.

The ARVN 21st Division attacked an entrenched VC force in Phong Dinh that was larger and better armed than planners had anticipated. Fierce fighting lasted all day and into the night. After dark, the VC broke out of the encirclement by overrunning the 2nd Battalion, 33rd Infantry. ARVN losses were 60 dead and 74 wounded, 17 missing, and 99 individual weapons, a mortar, and two light machine guns lost. VC losses were 86 killed, 21 captured and two tons of ammunition captured.

9 June

The VC 274th Regiment overran a training center at Giá Rai. After repulsing a counterattack by two Regional Forces platoons, the VC spent three hours loading a dozen trucks with loot. They then drove away with 200 weapons and other supplies. ARVN losses were 50 dead, 24 wounded, and 30 missing. One US adviser died, and another was wounded.

The lead vehicle in a CIDG column traveling on Highway 19 halted when it spotted PAVN/VC lying in ambush 10 km west of An Khê. As the Strikers dismounted, the PAVN/VC, who were also was dressed in CIDG uniforms, opened fire, killing the unit commander. The Strikers fled, but a US Special Forces soldier stood his ground, firing his weapon and hitting eight attackers until he exhausted his ammunition and then retreated. ARVN losses were ten dead, 18 wounded, and 11 weapons lost.

The first People's Liberation Army ground formations entered North Vietnam, dressed in North Vietnamese uniforms to disguise their identity. Their purpose was to build and maintain roads and railroads to facilitate the delivery of Communist bloc aid to North Vietnam.

9–13 June

In the Battle of Đồng Xoài, the VC overran the district capital, then withdrew following air strikes and ARVN reinforcements brought in by US helicopters, they then ambushed an airborne battalion. The battle resulted in 300+ VC, 416 ARVN killed and 233 missing and 18 US killed.

11 June

In a National Security Council meeting, Johnson said "We must delay and deter the North Vietnamese and Viet Cong as much as we can, and as simply as we can, without going all out. When we grant General Westmoreland's request, it means that we get in deeper and it is harder to get out. They think they are winning and we think they are. We must determine which course gives us the maximum protection at the least cost."

12 June

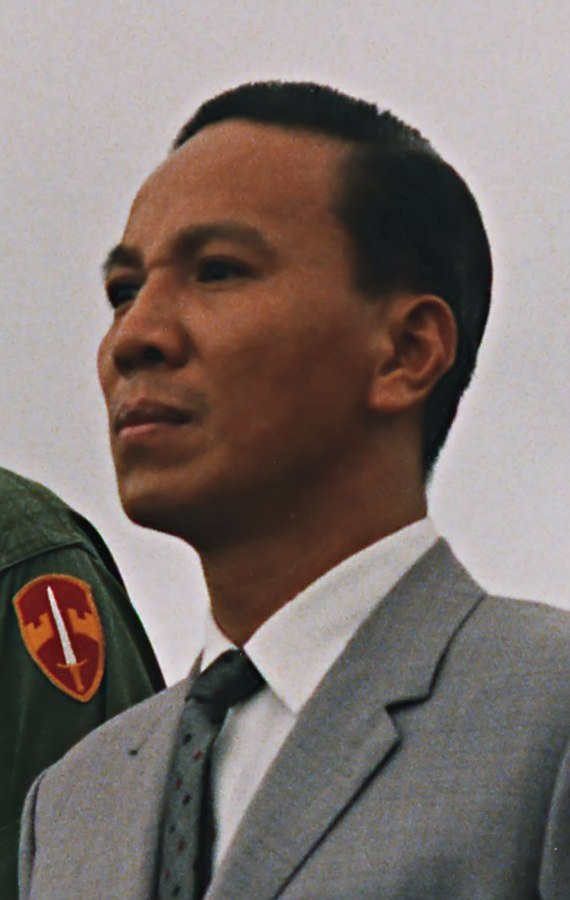
Nguyễn Văn Thiệu

South Vietnam's President Phan Khắc Sửu and Prime Minister Phan Huy Quát announced their resignations, less than eight months after they had formed a civilian government that worked within the oversight of the military leaders. Major General Nguyễn Văn Thiệu was named as the president, chairing the "Supreme Military Council" and Vice Air Marshal Nguyễn Cao Kỳ became prime minister.

Westmoreland asked the US Department of Defense for increased authority to undertake offensive operations. He said, "We have reached the point in Vietnam where we cannot avoid the commitment to combat of U.S. ground troops." The Pentagon endorsed Westmoreland's request for additional soldiers which would bring total U.S. military personnel in Vietnam up to 117,000, plus 20,000 third-country troops, by November 1.

The ARVN 2nd Division sent two understrength battalions and two Regional Forces companies to attack two VC local force companies 20 km south of Danang. VC losses were 41 killed, three captured and ten weapons. The allies estimated the VC had evacuated another 58 dead.

16 June

Senator J. William Fulbright, Chairman of the Senate Committee on Foreign Relations said on national television that the U.S. should negotiate directly with North Vietnam and make "major concessions" to end the war. Fulbright's statement was criticized by prominent Republicans; former Vice President Nixon said that negotiations "would be surrender on the installment plan".

McNamara announced that 22,000 additional troops were being sent to South Vietnam, while conceding that the war was going unfavorably for the U.S.

In Long Khanh province the VC attacked an ammunition convoy escorted by a Regional Forces company. Only two of the 16 trucks and 54 soldiers escaped. ARVN losses were 41 killed, 20 wounded, and 49 missing. Two US soldiers were killed.

17 June

Commander Louis Page and Lieutenant John Smith, of VF-21 operating from the USS Midway, scored the first U.S. Navy air kill of the war, shooting down a VPAF MiG-17 while flying an F-4B Phantom. In all, four MiGs were downed on that day by the U.S.

A suitcase bomb wounded 56 people, including 20 US servicemen at Tan Son Nhut Air Base.

18 June

Under Secretary of State George Ball wrote a memo to Johnson stating, "Ever since 1961 - the beginning of our deep involvement in Vietnam - we have met successive disappointments. We have tended to underestimate the strength and staying power of the enemy. We have tended to overestimate the effectiveness of our sophisticated weapons under jungle conditions. We have watched the progressive loss of territory to Viet Cong control. We have been unable to bring about the creation of a stable political base in Saigon." Ball advised caution in expanding the U.S. military commitment to South Vietnam.

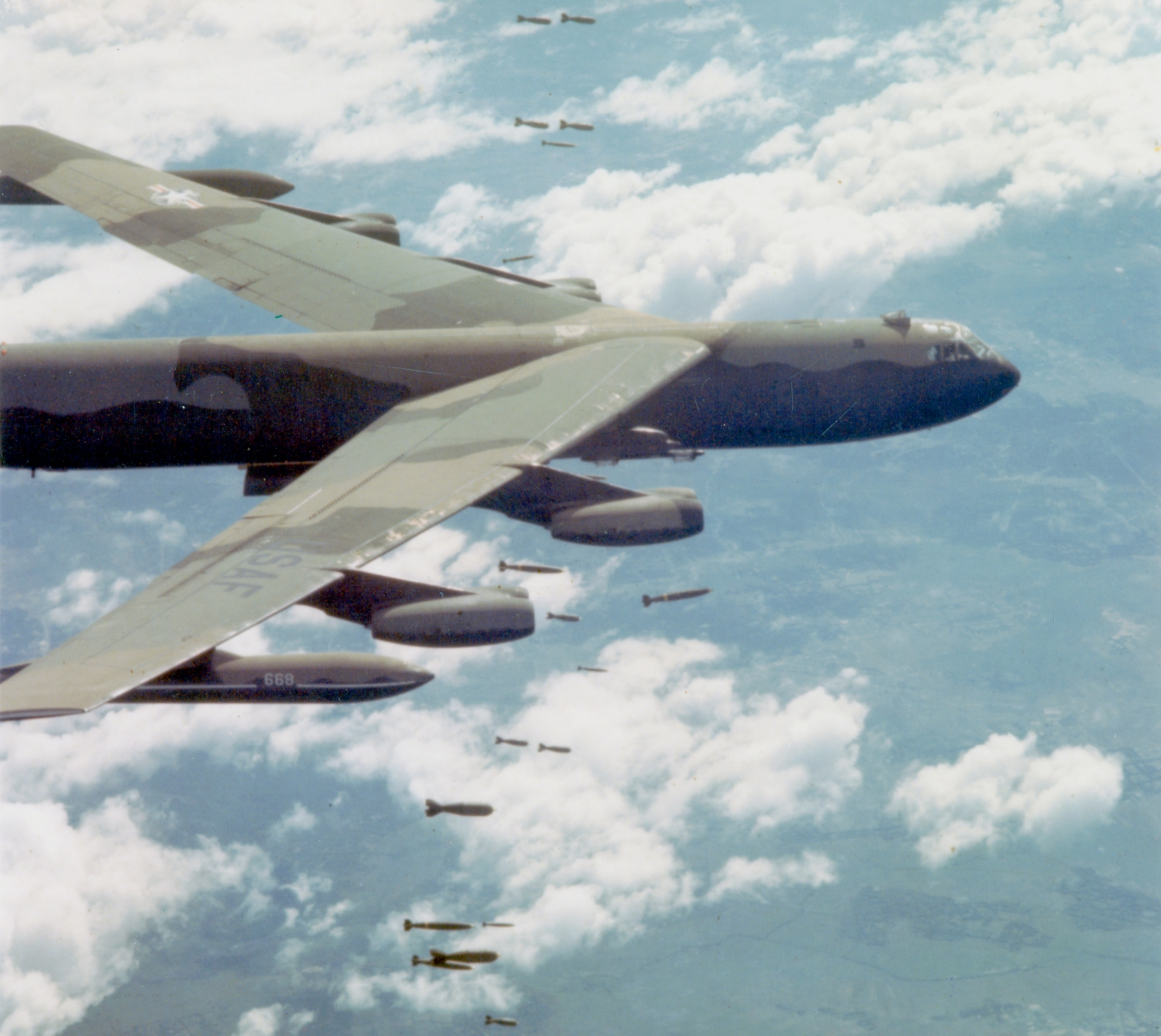
The B-52 bomber was first used in Vietnam in June 1965.

Under Operation Arc Light, B-52 aircraft were used for the first time in the Vietnam War. Flying out of Andersen Air Force Base, Guam, 27 B-52s dropped 750- and 1,000-pound bombs on a VC stronghold. Two B-52s were lost in a mid-air collision. An after-action survey found little evidence of VC casualties. An ARVN search of the area killed three VC, wounded three more, and took 16 prisoners.

19 June

Air Marshall Kỳ was appointed by the military junta as prime minister. With Thiệu as president and Kỳ as prime minister the revolving door of rulers that had prevailed in South Vietnam since the overthrow of Ngô Đình Diệm in November 1963 ended.

19–20 June

The ARVN 2nd Division launched an attack on the VC 38th Battalion and a local force company 10 km south of Quang Ngai. After encircling the target, the 2nd Battalion, 1st Infantry, on loan from the 1st Division, and a troop of M113s entered the area. Heavy fire from Thuan Hoa village led to an air and artillery bombardment followed by a successful assault backed by the M113s. Inside the advisers found two rings of trenches protected by barbed wire and bunkers whose roofs were over a meter thick. After securing Thuan Hoa, the battalion encountered light mortar fire while advancing on Hoa Que hamlet and fell back to Thuan Hoa for the night. On the 20th, the 2nd Battalion and another battalion advanced again toward Hoa Que, and again fell back in the face of light VC resistance. The 2nd Division then terminated the operation, without conducting the planned three days of searches meant to reestablish government control in the area. VC losses were 63 killed and 16 weapons captured. ARVN losses were five dead and nine missing.

20 June

After being ambushed while in support of a rescue operation, A-1 Skyraider pilots Clinton Johnson and Charles Hartman shoot down a VPAF MiG-17 with their 20 mm M3 cannons. This is the first confirmed air-to-air gun kill of the war.

22 June

The South Vietnamese publicly executed VC Tram Van Dong in Saigon for terrorism.

23 June

The Soviet Union rejected a proposal by British Prime Minister Harold Wilson to come to Moscow, along with the leaders of three other British Commonwealth states (the United Kingdom, Ghana, Nigeria, and Trinidad and Tobago), on a peace mission to end the war. Denying that the Soviet Union would have any influence over the Communist regime in North Vietnam, Soviet Premier Alexei Kosygin said that the U.S.S.R. "has not been authorized by anybody to conduct talks on a settlement in Viet Nam and the Soviet Government does not intend to conduct such negotiations."

The ARVN 2nd Division launched a raid 3 km northeast of Quang Ngai, in response to information as to the whereabouts of the VC 90th Battalion. Two battalions advanced, backed by an M113 troop. The force overcame strongpoints with air and artillery support. ARVN losses were three killed and three wounded. VC losses were 66 killed and 28 individual weapons and one 57 mm recoilless rifle captured.

24 June

Westmoreland advised Washington that he needed more soldiers than those previously approved and proposed that the US bomb the railroad from North Vietnam to China, mine Haiphong harbor, and carry out B-52 strikes.

In retaliation for the execution of Tram Van Dong, the VC executed Sergeant Harold G. Bennett who had been captured on 29 December in the Battle of Binh Gia.

25 June

The VC planted two bombs in central Saigon, the first on the My Canh Café floating restaurant and second on the riverbank to injure the first responders. The two bombs killed 31 people including 8 American servicemen.

More than 1,000 VC used human wave tactics to assault the ARVN 3rd Battalion, 49th Infantry, based 5 km from Đức Hòa district. To retard an allied response, the VC simultaneously bombarded three nearby posts, including the headquarters of the ARVN 25th Infantry Division. The 3rd Battalion resisted until eventually forced to retreat. ARVN losses were 44 dead, 40 wounded, and three missing. The VC lost 34 killed and three prisoners, with MACV estimating they had carried off another 108 casualties.

The PAVN 101st Regiment captured Tu Mơ Rông district and shelled Đăk Tô district headquarters. The South Vietnamese chose not to reoccupy Tu Mơ Rông.

26 June

Westmoreland was granted authority by the Department of Defense "to commit U.S. ground forces anywhere in the country when, in his judgement, they were needed to strengthen South Vietnamese forces."

27 June

The ARVN 7th Division attacked a meeting of the VC's Dinh Tuong province leadership at Xom Dao. Forewarned of the attack, the VC 514th Battalion and part of the 261st Battalion met the attack. While airstrikes hit the tree lines and canal banks that normally housed entrenchments, the VC instead had deployed in foxholes in the rice fields. The VC repulsed two attacks in fighting that lasted all day. The ARVN destroyed a 50-bed hospital, killed 31 VC, and estimated the VC had evacuated another 50 casualties. They also killed the entire seven-man Communist provincial committee and captured 29 VC and 16 weapons. ARVN losses were one dead and two wounded. Liberation Radio claimed the VC had won the battle, killing 300 South Vietnamese soldiers.

27–30 June

A battalion of the 173rd Airborne Brigade undertook the first major U.S.-led search and destroy mission of the war. ARVN and Australian soldiers also participated in the sweep through part of War Zone D, about 40 miles (64 km) northeast of Saigon. The assault began with an artillery barrage; it located very few VC. An observation of an Australian on the operation was: "Our patrols do not fire off ammo or shoot up flares like the Yanks - they listen and move quietly, we haven't fired a shot or sent up a flare yet. The Americans think we are mad. It seems to me though, that all they're doing is letting the Viet Cong know where they are. I guess we have a bit to teach them." The Australians had experience in jungle warfare in the Malayan Emergency. The operation killed 25 VC and captured or destroyed 250 tons of rice.

29 June

ARVN forces returned to Cai Lậy district to hit the VC 261st Battalion and 100 guerrillas. A ranger and seven infantry battalions, a reconnaissance company, and an M113 troop assaulted the VC, killing 164 and capturing nine individual weapons and three machine guns. The allies estimated the VC had carried off another 91 casualties. ARVN losses were 29 dead and 58 wounded. Two Americans died, and another two were wounded.

30 June – 1 July

II Corps sent two airborne battalions, an infantry battalion, and some artillery to evacuate Thuan Man district, Phú Bổn province after the VC seized most of the surrounding area. As the column approached Thuan Man village a VC regiment attacked it from hills overlooking the road. The battle raged all day. The VC overran the task force headquarters and forced the infantry battalion out of the fight, but the airborne battalions held. Nightfall found the ARVN in a defensive perimeter and low on ammunition. Intelligence reported that the B–3 Front had another infantry regiment nearby ad the JGS sent a marine task force plus two airborne battalions to reinforce. On 1 July, the marines were able to reach the surrounded column. The allies decided to evacuate the Thuan Man garrison by helicopter, but VC fire proved too intense for the helicopters to land. The garrison then escaped by an unexpected route to the Buon Brieng special forces camp. ARVN losses were 30 dead, 59 wounded, 159 missing, and seven trucks destroyed. Four Americans died, and three suffered wounds. The VC lost 300 killed, but gained control over Thuan Man District.

== July ==
1 July

Undersecretary of State Ball dissented from the buildup of American forces in South Vietnam. He wrote President Johnson that "The Viet Cong - while supported and guided from the North - is largely an indigenous movement" and that "although we have emphasized its Cold War aspects, the conflict in South Vietnam is essentially a civil war within that country." Ball's view conflicted with the official view that the insurgency in South Vietnam had been created and was sustained by North Vietnam.

Australia began training its first draftees for the war, bringing up the first of 63,790 conscripts who would have two years full-time service in the Australian Regular Army, followed by further service in the army reserves. In all, 804,286 young men who were 20 years old at the time that the draft reactivated, or turned 20 during the Vietnam era, registered for National Service.

A PAVN/VC mortar and sapper attack on Da Nang Air Base destroyed one F-102 and two C-130s and damaged a further two F-102s and one C-130.

The Special Landing Force comprising 3rd Battalion, 7th Marines and HMM-163 landed at Qui Nhơn to secure the area. They would be replaced by the 2nd Battalion, 7th Marines on 8 July.

The ARVN 1st Division used an M113 troop, a Regional Forces company, and four Popular Forces platoons to react to an attack in Thua Thien province by two VC companies.they withdrew. VC losses were 92 killed and 18 captured along with 25 weapons and two mortars. ARVN losses were seven dead and six missing.

4 July

The A-6 Intruder attack plane made its combat debut, as several were launched from the USS Independence on a combat mission.

Following reports of a reinforced VC battalion 10 km north of Vĩnh Châu, Bac Lieu province, the ARVN 21st Division launched an attack involving three infantry and two ranger battalions, a reconnaissance company. The battle continued until dark, but by the morning of the 5th, the VC were gone. The VC left behind 212 dead, 19 prisoners, 33 individual weapons, and two mortars. ARVN losses were 14 dead and 30 wounded. US losses were one dead and four wounded and one O-1B shot down.

5 July

The VC again attacked Ba Gia. Before dawn they wheeled 75 mm howitzers up to the post's perimeter. The guns blasted the fort as several battalions swept over the parapet. The VC quickly overran the garrison — an infantry battalion, a scout company, and a 105 mm platoon before allied air power could arrive. ARVN losses were 21 dead, 88 missing and 224 infantry weapons and two howitzers lost.

6 July

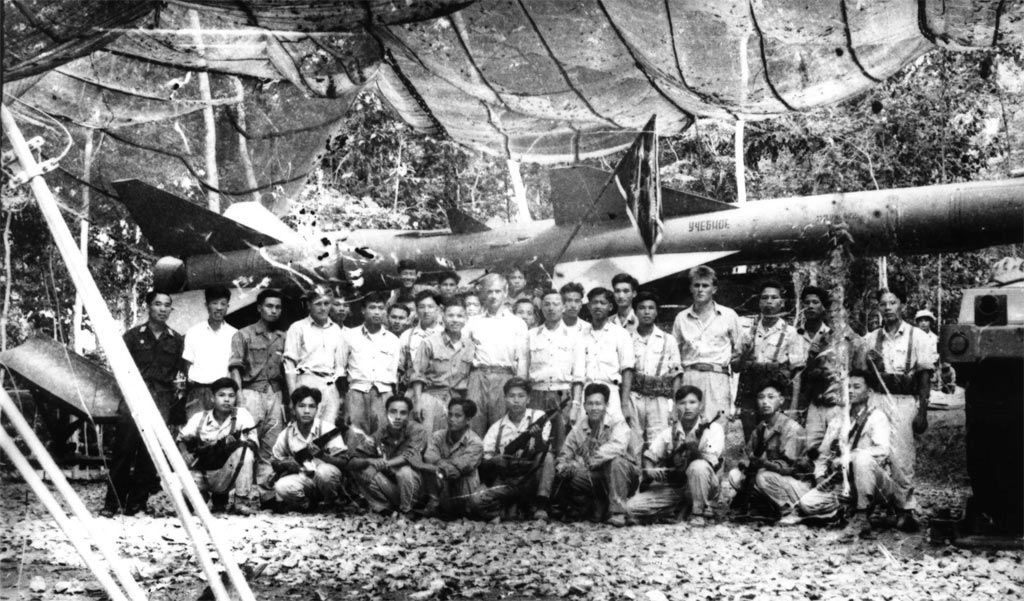
Soviet advisers at an anti-aircraft missile training center in North Vietnam

The Soviet Union's Council of Ministers approved sending 2,500 army instructors to North Vietnam, to train North Vietnamese troops on how to use surface-to-air missiles against American airplanes.

6–9 July

After B-52 strikes, the U.S. 173rd Airborne Brigade began another sweep through War Zone D with 2,500 men and ARVN 10th Division and Australian participation. ARVN losses were 10 killed and 46 wounded. VC losses were 51 dead and 38 prisoners. MACV estimated the VC carried off another 150 casualties as the allies captured 38 weapons and destroyed seven revolutionary villages plus ten tons of rice.

7 July

Former Olympian Lieutenant Ronald Zinn commanding a platoon of B Company, 2nd Battalion, 503rd Infantry Regiment was killed in action in War Zone D.

The PAVN captured Đăk Tô and rebuffed an attempt by the 42nd Infantry to regain the post, killing the regiment's commander and seriously wounding his adviser. Four ARVN battalions eventually retook the town.

8 July

Maxwell Taylor resigned as U.S. Ambassador to South Vietnam. Taylor had opposed the introduction of U.S. ground troops into South Vietnam, proposing instead an intensified air campaign against North Vietnam. Taylor would be replaced by Henry Cabot Lodge Jr., who returned to Saigon for his second stint as ambassador.

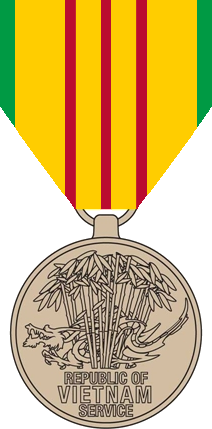
Vietnam Service Medal

The Vietnam Service Medal was established by Executive Order 11231 for all members of the armed services who served in the Vietnam War.

The VC attacked a small post 2 km outside of Dầu Tiếng. The ARVN 5th Division hurriedly dispatched the 2nd Battalion, 9th Infantry, without a forward observer or air cover. At 12:10, two VC battalions ambushed the column as it neared the post, killing 103 soldiers (including four Americans) and wounding 26. Another 199 soldiers went missing, with all but 79 eventually returning to the colors. The VC captured a mortar, a machine gun, 13 Browning automatic rifles, and 101 individual weapons.

9 July

The VC attacked the Junk Force base on Ky Hoa Island, Marine units were sent to help repel the assault. 16 Junk Force sailors and two U.S. Navy advisers were killed in the initial attack and three Marines were killed in clearing the VC.

10 July

The New York Times reported that the 173rd Airborne suffered 10 killed and 42 wounded on its sweep through War Zone D, and that its estimates of VC casualties were inflated. The newspaper reported that the U.S. had begun "to accept aerial estimates of enemy casualties. The command has also begun to calculate probable damage inflicted on the Viet Cong despite the absence of bodies or weapons."

Two USAF F-4C Phantom fighters of the 45th Tactical Fighter Squadron shot down two VPAF MiG-17 fighters, scoring the first confirmed USAF jet victories of the war.

12 July

The 2nd Brigade of the U.S. 1st Infantry Division began to arrive in South Vietnam. The brigade was initially responsible for providing security for Bien Hoa Air Base.

13 July

U.S. Army Sergeant First Class Isaac Camancho became the first U.S. prisoner of war to successfully escape from a VC prison camp. Four days earlier, Camancho had managed to pry loose a bar on a bamboo cage where he had been kept at night, after having been captured 19 months earlier on 24 November 1963.

15 July

The first New Zealand Army combat unit, 161 Battery, Royal New Zealand Artillery arrived at Bien Hoa Air Base.

Two VC battalions attacked the bivouac of the 2nd Battalion, 7th Infantry, which was engaged in a road-clearing operation. The rest of the 7th Infantry was nearby but did not respond quickly to help. ARVN losses were 44 killed, 63 wounded and 17 missing, and 43 individual and six crew-served weapons lost. Two Americans were killed and four wounded. The VC also destroyed four M113s and damaged five more.

The VC attacked a road-clearing operation on Highway 1 in Quang Nam that consisted of three battalions and two Regional Forces companies. ARVN losses were 92 killed, 30 wounded and 111 weapons lost. The ARVN then drove off the VC, killing 174 and capturing 16 prisoners, 27 individual weapons, and a recoilless rifle. The ARVN also detained 145 suspects and believed they had inflicted an additional 100 casualties on the VC.

16 July

McNamara, visiting South Vietnam, was briefed by Westmoreland who said that U.S. airstrikes had not succeeded in halting the flow of military supplies down the Ho Chi Minh trail. To defeat the VC, now reinforced by the PAVN, would require another large influx of U.S. soldiers amounting to 57 battalions plus helicopter companies and support units. Westmoreland said he planned to reverse the deteriorating military situation by the end of 1965, take the offensive in 1966, and destroy the VC and capture their strongholds by the end of 1967.

Three months after a commitment by China's President Liu Shaoqi to provide Chinese pilots to fight in North Vietnam, the Chinese General Staff notified North Vietnam's Defense Ministry that "the time was not appropriate" to supply the assistance.

17 July

The ARVN 22nd Division and eight reserve battalions launched Operation Than Phong to reopen Highway 19 and deliver supplies to Pleiku.

20 July

McNamara returned to Washington and recommended to Johnson that the number of U.S. troops in South Vietnam be increased to 175,000. He recommended also that 235,000 soldiers in the Reserve and National Guard be activated and that the number of U.S. military personnel be increased by 375,000 and that air strikes against North Vietnam be increased from 2,500 to 4,000 per month.

On the 11th anniversary of the signing of the Geneva Accords ending the First Indochina War, Ho Chi Minh said that the North Vietnamese and the VC will fight for 20 years or more to achieve victory and unification of the two Vietnams.

Police in Saigon foiled a plot to assassinate outgoing U.S. Ambassador Taylor, 15 minutes before he was scheduled to enter a stadium for South Vietnam's "National Unity Day for the Liberation of North Viet Nam" rally. VC members had placed a shrapnel-loaded bomb at a cemetery across the street from the entrance that Taylor was to use.

20–1 July

Two VC battalions attacked Bù Đốp Camp. At daybreak three CIDG companies arrived from Camp Bù Gia Mập securing the camp. VC losses were 158 killed and two captured. ARVN losses were 59 killed, 39 wounded and 74 missing. US losses were two killed and four wounded.

21 July

President Johnson convened his advisers in a meeting of the 15 member National Security Council at the White House, prior to making a decision about the direction that the United States should take in fighting the war. During the morning session, George Ball, the United States Under Secretary of State strongly argued against the recommendation by Secretary of Defense McNamara to increase the number of American troops in South Vietnam. According to minutes of that day's meeting that would be released years later, Ball urged that the U.S. should "cut its losses" and allow the South Vietnamese government to "do what seems natural to it, let it fall apart" and, with the rest of the advisers against him, closed with the prophetic statement that South Vietnam would ultimately lose to the VC guerrillas, regardless of McNamara's plans to commit 175,000 additional troops, that the U.S. would not get out with a victory, and that "we'll double our bet and get lost in the rice paddies." In the course of the discussion, General Wallace M. Greene Jr. estimated that winning the war would take 5 years and 500,000 American soldiers. He said that he believed the American people would back such a commitment. Johnson was skeptical that Americans would support such a large commitment and opted instead for a gradual buildup of American forces and escalation of the war as recommended by Westmoreland.

24 July

A USAF F-4C Phantom #63–7599 was shot down by a North Vietnamese SAM-2 45 miles (72 km) northeast of Hanoi, in the first loss of a US aircraft to a North Vietnamese SAM. The pilot, Captain Richard P. Keirn ejected successfully from his stricken aircraft and was captured. His bombardier/navigator Captain Roscoe H. Fobair failed to eject and was killed, his remains were recovered in 2001. 24 July would be celebrated in North Vietnam as "Missile Day".

25 July

Clark Clifford advised Johnson that the war would be "a huge catastrophe," taking "five years" and costing the US "50,000 men killed, hundreds of billions of dollars" spent. Realizing that Johnson might not stomach an immediate withdrawal, he recommended keeping the strength levels as they were, with the troops tucked away in coastal garrisons until the end of the year as US diplomats looked aggressively "for an honorable way out."

27 July

In a meeting with Johnson most Congressional leaders of both parties agreed with his plan to increase U.S. military forces in South Vietnam. The exception was Senator Mike Mansfield, while publicly supporting the President said at the meeting, said, "we are going deeper into a war in which even a total victory would, in the end, be a loss to the nation". Mansfield proposed negotiations to end the war.

U.S. aircraft struck a surface-to-air missile installation for the first time, attacking an SA-2 site at Suối Hai, Hà Tây Province, North Vietnam. Operation Spring High took off with 46 F-105 fighter-bombers and 58 other supporting aircraft to bomb the sites, losing six planes in the process and destroying only one of the two targets, designated as "Site 6". Afterward, "bomb damage assessment photos disclosed that there was a dummy missile in Site 6, placed there as a trap, and that Site 7 was empty."

28 July

In a nationally televised speech, Johnson announced his decision to send an additional 50,000 US troops, including the 1st Cavalry Division (Airmobile) to South Vietnam, increasing the number of personnel there by two-thirds and to bring the commitment to 125,000. Johnson also said that the monthly draft call would more than double, to more than 1,000 new young men per day (from 17,000 to 35,000) for enlistment and training in the U.S. Armed Forces, but he declined to activate the Reserve and National Guard. He justified America's involvement in Vietnam in terms of history and the global ideological struggle. Surrender in Vietnam would not bring peace, "because we learned from Hitler at Munich that success only feeds the appetite of aggression. If we are driven from the field in Vietnam, then no nation can ever again have the same confidence in the American promise, or in American protection." He predicted that U.S. combat troops would "convince the Communists that we cannot be defeated by force," and "once the Communists know, as we know, that a violent solution is impossible, then a peaceful solution is inevitable." Johnson timed the speech for the noon hour in Washington, when there were fewer television viewers.

29 July

The 1st Brigade of the U.S. 101st Airborne Division arrived at Cam Ranh Bay and set up its base camp there.

== August ==
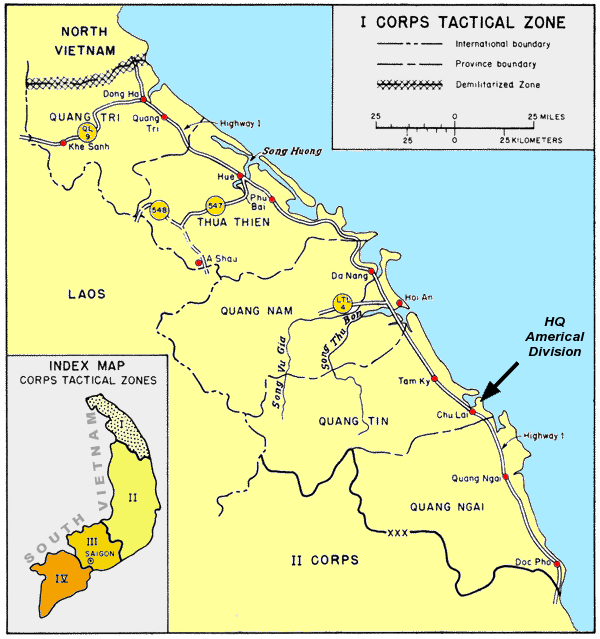
The first U.S. Marines to arrive in South Vietnam in 1965 were based in I Corps at Da Nang. Their biggest battle in 1965, Operation Starlite, took place a few miles south of the city of Chu Lai.

Sixty-one percent of Americans responded "no" to the following question by the Gallup Poll, "Do you think the U.S. made a mistake sending troops to fight in Vietnam?"

1 August

General Lo Jui-ching, the Chief of Joint Staff of the armed forces of the People's Republic of China, declared on Radio Peking that the Chinese were ready to fight the United States again, as they had in the Korean War. Comparing Johnson to Adolf Hitler, Benito Mussolini and Hideki Tojo, General Lo said of the Americans that "If they lose all sense of reality in their lust for gain and persist in underestimating the strength and determination of the Chinese people, impose a war on us, and compel us to accept the challenge, the Chinese people and the Chinese People's Liberation Army, long well prepared and standing in battle array, not only will stay with you without fail to the end, but invite you to come in large numbers, the more the better.

3 August

After coming under VC sniper fire, U.S. Marines burned down the South Vietnamese village of Cam Ne, "using flame throwers, cigarette lighters and bulldozers" to set fire to 150 houses made up of straw, thatch, and bamboo and bulldozing homes made of sturdier materials. Major General Lewis W. Walt, the commander of the 3rd Marine Division, said in a statement that "the civilians had been urged in advance by helicopter loudspeakers to go to open fields where they would be safe" before their homes were burned down. The Marines were accompanied by CBS reporter Morley Safer and a cameraman, and while the newspaper reports of the deliberate destruction of homes had little impact, American TV viewers were shocked when they saw film of the attack on the CBS Evening News, and President Johnson was infuriated by the CBS decision to show the war in an unfavorable light.

3–17 August

Đức Cơ Camp, 45 kilometres (28 mi) southwest of Pleiku had been under siege by the VC since late May. On 8 August the South Vietnamese Marines Task Force Alpha and an ARVN armored task force departed Pleiku on 8 August to relieve the garrison. On 9 August they came into heavy contact with a PAVN battalion dug in astride Route 19. The South Vietnamese attacked and dislodged the PAVN, only to have the rear of the column attacked by another reinforced PAVN battalion. Battered by air strikes all night long, the PAVN 32nd Regiment, launched a final attack at dawn and then withdrew from the battlefield. On 10 August the South Vietnamese moved into Đức Cơ and broke the siege. The South Vietnamese infantry, with the support of U.S. and RVNAF air strikes, claimed to have killed over 400 PAVN and captured 71 weapons. VNMC losses were 28 killed and 3 missing. General Westmoreland sent the 173rd Airborne Brigade to Pleiku and the brigade opened the highway from Pleiku to Duc Co.

5 August

The VC attacked the Esso petroleum storage facility in Liên Chiểu District near Da Nang, destroying 40 percent of the facility and almost 2 million gallons of fuel.

Former General and Ambassador Maxwell Taylor, now an adviser to President Johnson, told the President: "By the end of 1965, the North Vietnamese offensive will be bloodied and defeated without having achieved major gains." North Vietnam would be forced to change its strategy.

Gerald R. Ford, a Congressman from Michigan and the leader of the Republican minority in the House of Representatives, urged President Johnson to ask Congress to declare war on North Vietnam, so that the increasing commitment of American servicemen could be debated. "It would be the honest thing to do under the circumstances, considering our present commitment."

6 August

After its pilots ejected safely, a battle-damaged USAF B-57 bomber and its payload of 16 armed 250-pound bombs crashed in a residential area of Nha Trang, killing at least 12 people and injuring 75 others.

12 August

The North Vietnamese revealed that they had mobile SAM-2 units that could be taken to any location, shooting down a U.S. Navy A-4 Skyhawk flying 50 miles (80 km) southwest of Hanoi. Lieutenant (j.g.) Donald H. Brown Jr. operating from the USS Coral Sea was killed in the crash, becoming the first U.S. Navy flier to be downed by a SAM missile.

15 August

The VC attacked the National Police headquarters in Saigon killing two guards and exploding a bomb in the building before making their escape. The VC claim to have killed 165 police in the attack.

18–24 August

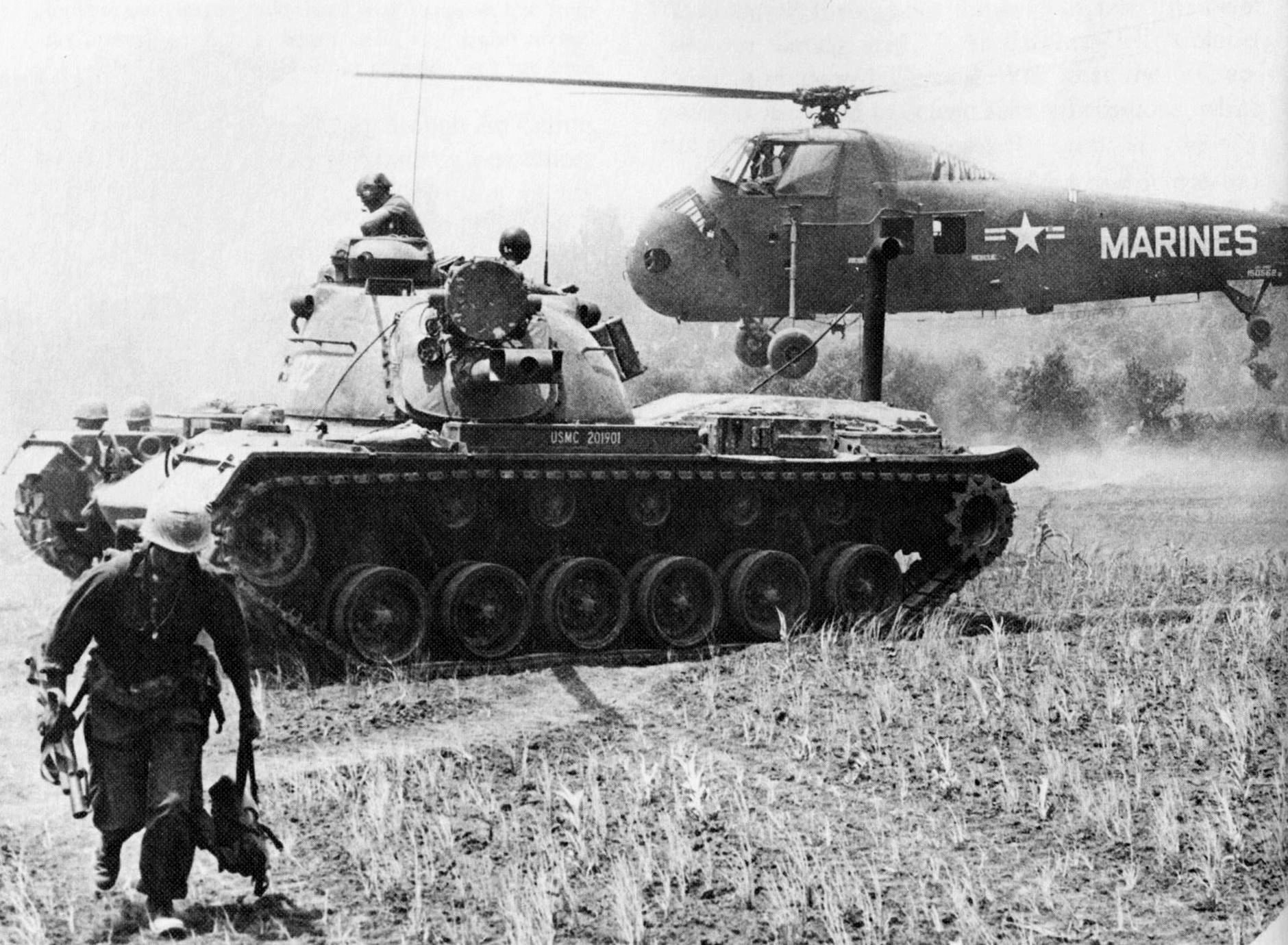
Operation Starlite

Operation Starlite was the first offensive military action conducted by the U.S. Marines during the war and the first purely American operation. Lieutenant General Lewis W. Walt with 5,500 Marines launched a preemptive strike against 1,500 VC to nullify a threat on the Chu Lai base, 60 miles (97 km) south of Da Nang. The operation resulted in 614 VC killed and 42 captured and 45 Marines killed. General William E. DePuy at a later briefing said that the VC "maneuvered in the jungle, maintained tactical integrity, withdrew their wounded, lost practically no weapons, and did a first class job" and that "we'd be proud of American troops...who did as well."

22 August to 2 October

Operation Highland was a clearing operation around An Khê conducted by the 1st Brigade, 101st Airborne Division to secure the area for the arrival of the 1st Cavalry Division. The operation resulted in 692 PAVN/VC and 21 U.S. killed.

24 August

A U.S. Marines C-130 Hercules plunged into Yau Tong Bay shortly after takeoff from Hong Kong's Kai Tak Airport killing 58 of the 71 U.S. military personnel onboard who had been on R&R and were returning to South Vietnam.

26 August

President Johnson signed an Executive Order removing a marriage exemption from the draft, although married fathers between the ages of 19 and 26 were still exempt. Americans who got married before midnight on the 26th would remain exempt from conscription into military service. Hundreds of men drove to Nevada in order to get married without a waiting period and would find out four days later that they had only deferred eligibility for four months; General Lewis B. Hershey announced on 30 August that all married, childless men (aged 19 to 26) would be eligible for the draft beginning in January, 1966.

28 August

A VC attack on Cần Thơ is repulsed with the VC losing more than 50 killed.

29 August

The 1st Battalion, 9th Marines operating south of the Marble Mountains engaged a VC company killing 12 VC and capturing 12. Later intelligence revealed that the VC had actually lost 30 killed.

31 August

Johnson signs into a law a bill that criminalizes the destruction or defacing of a draft card, with penalties of a $10,000 fine and/or five years in prison.

== September ==
1 September

China lodged a protest with the United Kingdom for allowing American troops to visit Hong Kong while on R&R. The Chinese, who were obligated under a 99-year lease to allow the British to use the area as a colony until 1997, likened the recreational use to the placement of an American military base in mainland China. The diplomatic note was delivered in Beijing to British Chargé d'Affaires K. M. Wilford, who was summoned to the Chinese Foreign Ministry by Hsieh Li, the Director of the Ministry's Department for Western European affairs.

The U.S. Marine Corps announced that it was cutting the amount of training of new recruits from 12 weeks of boot camp to only eight, in response to the sudden increase in combat troops assigned to the war. "The aim is to process 30,000 additional men," a report noted, "without adding to present marine facilities or increasing the staff of instructors", effectively educating 50% more U.S. Marines each year.

5–7 September

During Operation Stomp, the 2/7th Marines used what it described as tear gas to force hidden VC guerrillas into the open in the South Vietnamese village of Vinh Quang in the Binh Dinh Province. The North Vietnamese branch of the International Red Cross, however, said that the 48 canisters were of a high concentration of phenacyl chloride or CN gas and that 35 civilians had been killed. USMC Lieutenant Colonel Leon N. Utter was investigated but cleared of wrongdoing. The operation resulted in 26 VC killed and three captured.

6 September

The New York Times reported that ex-Vice President Richard Nixon said at a press conference that 125,000 American troops and an expanded bombing campaign would be sufficient to achieve victory in South Vietnam.

7–10 September

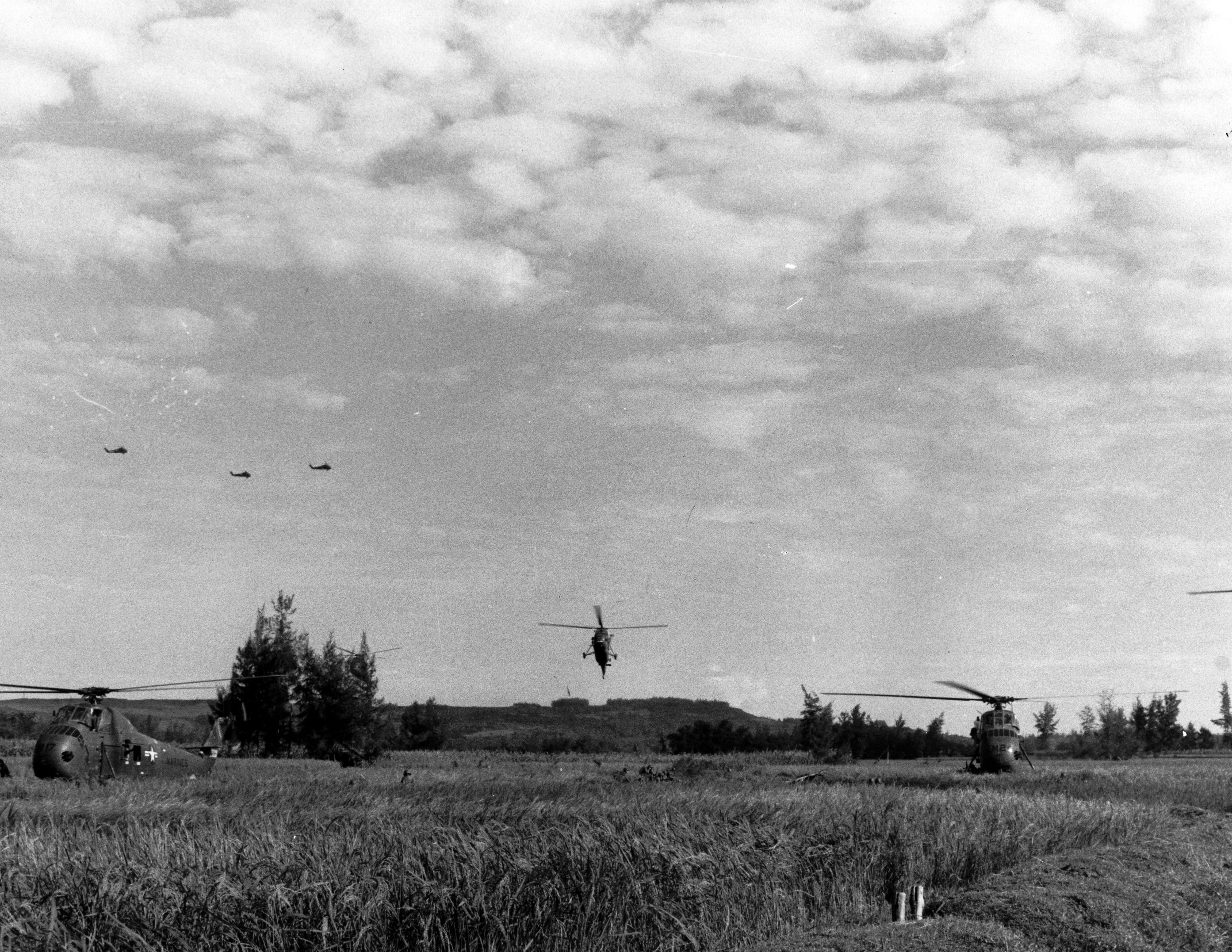
Marine UH-34s land the ARVN 2nd Battalion, 4th Regiment during Operation Piranha

Operation Piranha was an assault by the U.S. 7th Marine Regiment, the ARVN 2nd Battalion, 4th Regiment, 2nd Division and the 3rd Vietnamese Marine Battalion on the VC stronghold on the Batangan Peninsula, Quảng Ngãi Province. The operation resulted in 178 VC, two U.S. and five South Vietnamese killed.

11 September

The U.S. 1st Cavalry Division (Airmobile) began to arrive in South Vietnam at Qui Nhơn. The division was the first full U.S. Army division to be deployed to South Vietnam and relied on helicopters to transport its combat units to and from operational areas.

13 September

Columnist Joseph Alsop writing in The Washington Post said that, with the U.S. military build-up in South Vietnam, "at last there is light at the end of the tunnel".

14 September

Sergeant Alistair Don and Bombardier Robert White become the first two New Zealand soldiers killed in the war when their Land Rover is hit by a command detonated mine on Route 13.

16 September

An Air Vietnam DC-3 was shot down 11 km northeast of Quảng Ngãi killing all 39 on board.

18 September

In Operation Gibraltar, 224 soldiers of the 2nd Battalion, 502nd Infantry Regiment, 101st Airborne Division landed by helicopter near An Khê, in the Central Highlands area where two VC battalions were located. The VC attacked and killed 13 Americans. Air strikes forced the VC to retreat, with losses estimated by the U.S. at between 226 and 257. General Westmoreland called the operation "a great victory". Others, including Col. David H. Hackworth, considered the battle "not... a great victory."

20 September

Six U.S. warplanes were shot down over North and South Vietnam.

Two People's Liberation Army Air Force Shenyang J-6 fighters shot down a USAF F-104C Starfighter #56–883 and captured its pilot, USAF Captain Philip E. Smith, when due to equipment failure and incorrect navigational commands he strayed into Chinese airspace over Hainan. Smith would spend more than seven years in solitary confinement in a Chinese prison until being released at Hong Kong on 15 March 1973.

22 September

General Westmoreland requested 35,000 additional U.S. troops, which would bring the total military personnel authorized in South Vietnam to 210,000. President Johnson and Secretary of Defense McNamara set a limit of the total number of U.S. soldiers of 195,000.

The South Korean 2nd Marine Brigade arrived in South Vietnam and was deployed just outside Tuy Hoa.

26 September

U.S. Army Captain Humbert Roque "Rocky" Versace, 28, and U.S. Army Master Sergeant Kenneth M. Roraback, 33, were executed by the VC. According to a broadcast by Radio Hanoi, the two men, both of whom had been held prisoner since 1963, were killed in reprisal for the execution of three VC in Da Nang on the 23rd. Versace would be posthumously awarded the Medal of Honor on 8 July 2002.

30 September – 1 October

General Suharto seized power in Indonesia ostensibly in response to an attempted coup by the Communist Party of Indonesia. An anti-communist purge followed and Suharto consolidated power with U.S. support and so "stabilising" the Indonesian "domino".

== October ==
October

The "Fish" Cheer/I-Feel-Like-I'm-Fixin'-to-Die Rag is first released by Country Joe and the Fish, it would become one of the most recognized protest songs against the war.

October – June 1967

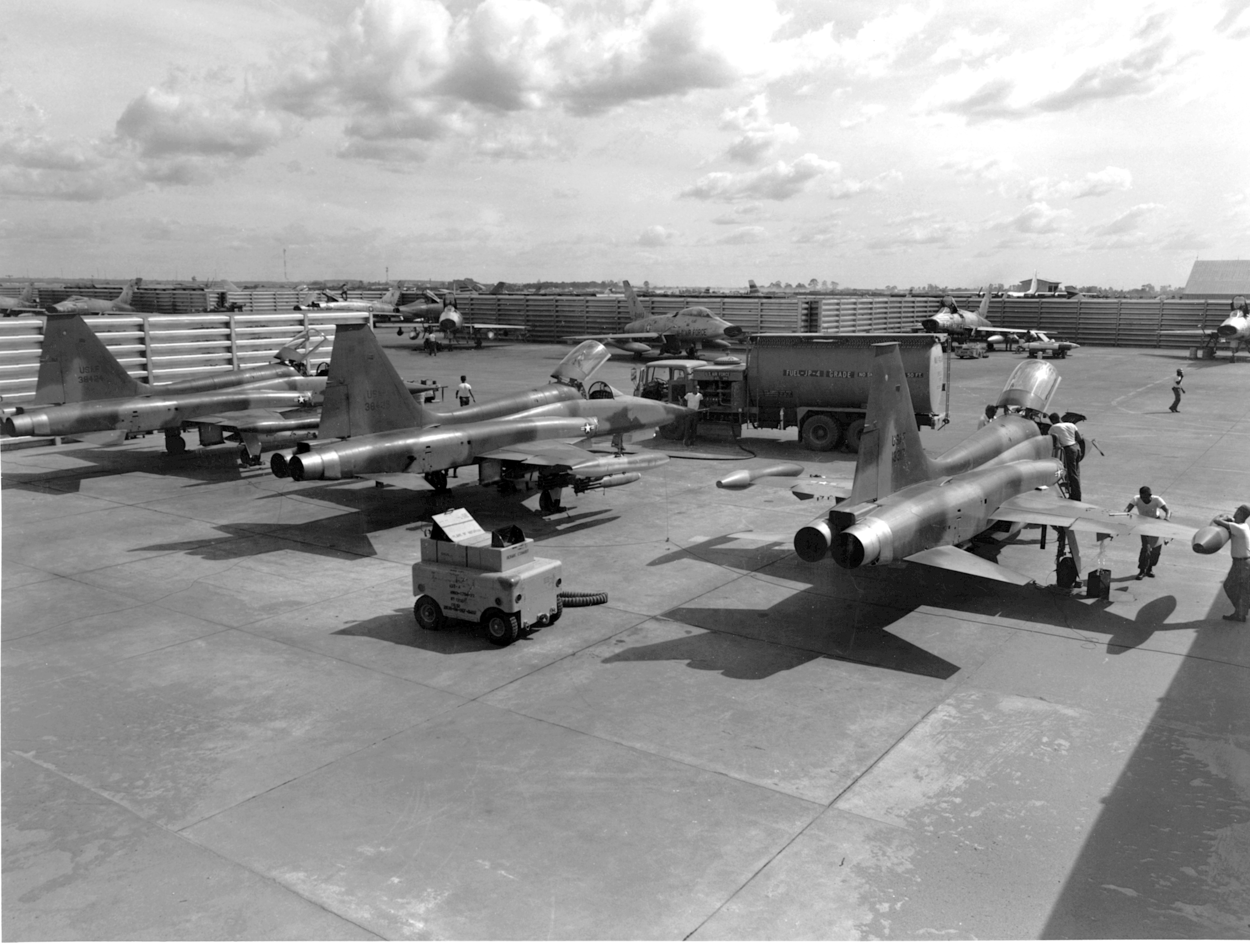
Skoshi Tiger F-5s at Bien Hoa Air Base

Project Skoshi Tiger was the combat testing of 12 F-5A/B Freedom Fighters by the USAF 4503rd Tactical Fighter Squadron. In June 1967 the surviving aircraft were transferred to the RVNAF to form their first jet squadron, the 522nd Fighter Squadron.

4 October

One of two planted bombs exploded at the Cong Boa National Sports Stadium, killing eleven Vietnamese, including four children and wounding 42 persons.

5 October

A bomb went off, apparently prematurely, in a taxi on a main street in downtown Saigon, killing two Vietnamese and wounding ten others.

9–13 October

The 173rd Airborne Brigade conducted a sweep in the Iron Triangle killing 81 VC and capturing 79 for the loss of eight U.S. killed.

12 October

Senator John C. Stennis said that it might be necessary for U.S. troops to remain in South Vietnam for 15 years to ensure security.

15 October

David Miller "a Catholic pacifist" burnt his draft card during an anti-war rally in New York City organized by the Catholic Worker Movement. On 18 October he was arrested by the FBI under the new federal law that made defacement of a selective service information card punishable as a crime and later served 22 months in prison.

16 October

Protests against the war took place in Europe and in about 40 U.S. cities. The organization coordinating the U.S. demonstrations was called the National Coordinating Committee to End the War in Vietnam.

17 October

The first successful American attack on a North Vietnamese SAM site was accomplished when four A-4 Skyhawks struck a site near Kép Air Base northeast of Hanoi.

18 October

In the first Shining Brass mission against the Ho Chi Minh Trail in Laos an RVNAF CH-34 and an O-1 collided and disappeared killing all four on the aircraft, including Captain Larry Thorne.

18–20 October

Two companies from 3rd Battalion, 3rd Marines conducted Operation Triple Play 12 miles (19 km) north of Chu Lai resulting in 16 VC killed and six captured.

19–25 October

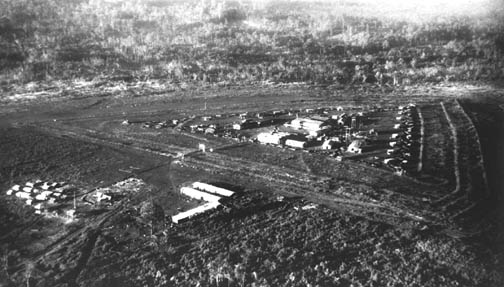
Plei Me Special Forces camp in 1965

The Siege of Plei Me was a series of assaults by the PAVN on a CIDG camp manned by U.S. and ARVN special forces and rangers and 400 Montagnard allies. U.S. airstrikes and a relief force lifted the siege. The siege resulted in 326 PAVN killed and a further 850 estimated killed in the siege and pursuit, 14 CIDG and three U.S. killed.

24 October to 26 November

Operation All The Way was a 1st Cavalry Division operation to pursue the PAVN retreating from Plei Me. 216 PAVN were killed and 138 captured, U.S. losses were 57 killed.

26 October

Two Marine F-4B Phantoms returning to Da Nang Air Base crashed into the side of Monkey Mountain killing all four crewmen.

27 October

A CIA intelligence estimate said that "Hanoi continues to asset its determination to press on with the war in South Vietnam despite the continuing attrition of the air war and the increase of US troops in the South."

The South Korean Capital Division arrived in South Vietnam and was deployed outside of Qui Nhơn.

27/8 October

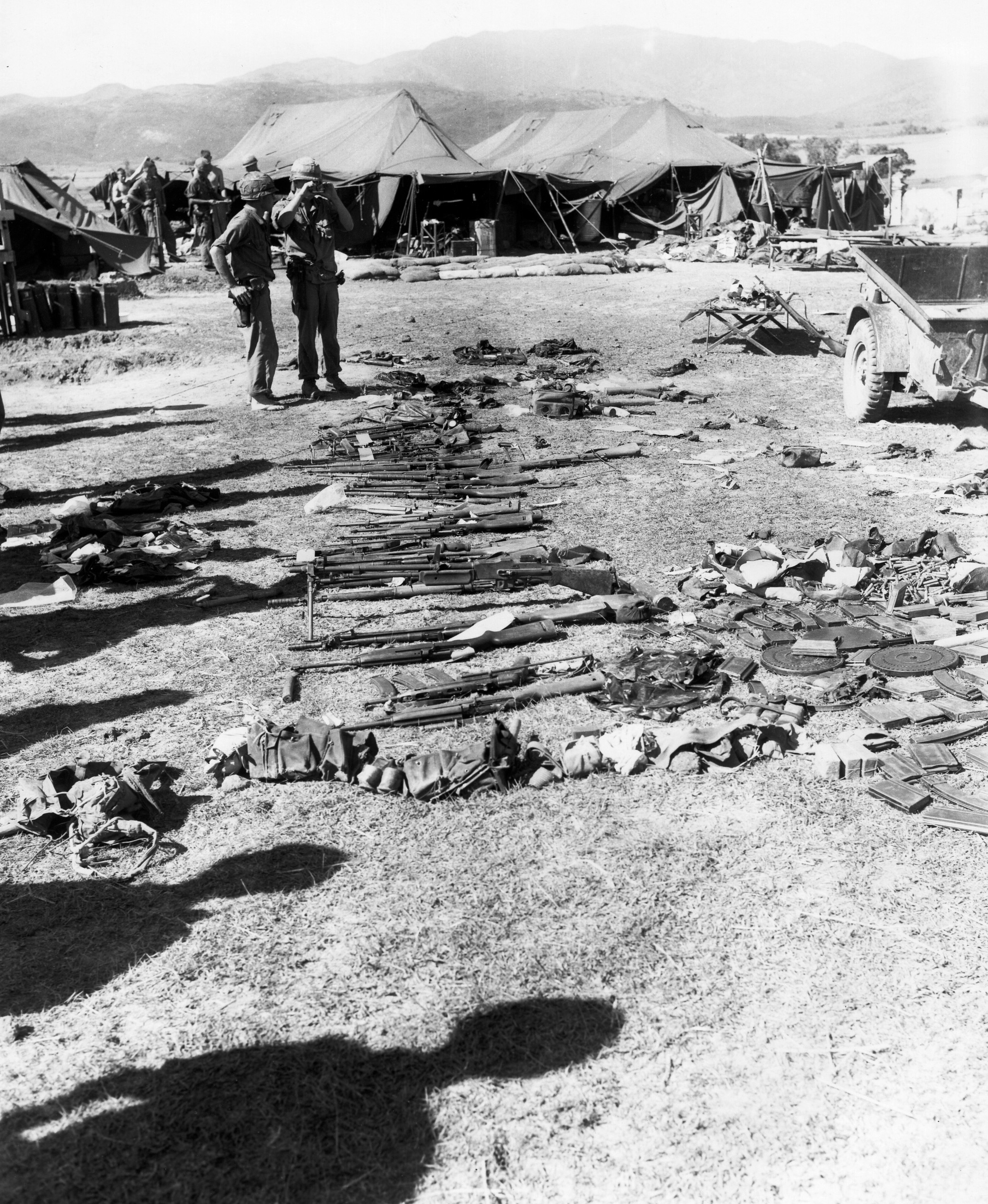
VC weapons captured after the attack on Marble Mountain Air Facility

Approximately 90 VC attacked Marble Mountain Air Facility near Da Nang under the cover of 60 mm mortar fire using four demolition teams armed with Bangalore torpedoes and hand grenades. They were able to destroy 19 aircraft and damage another 35. VMO-2 took the brunt of the attack with 13 of its UH-1E Hueys destroyed. The attack killed two Marines and one Navy Corpsman with another 91 wounded. Seventeen Viet Cong were killed during the battle and four wounded VC were captured.

The VC penetrated Chu Lai Air Base destroying two A-4 Skyhawks and damaging a further six. Marines killed 15 of the 20-man VC sapper squad.

30 October

In New York City, 25,000 people marched down Fifth Avenue in support of Johnson and the war. Demonstrations of support took place in other locations in the United States as well. The New York march was sponsored by the New York City Council, the American Legion and the Veterans of Foreign Wars.

Two USAF A-1 Skyraiders mistakenly struck the South Vietnamese village of De Duc near Bong Son in Bình Định Province, killing 48 civilians, mostly women and children and injuring 48 more. The mistake is later attributed to a map reading error by South Vietnamese.

The VC attacked Hill 22 south of the Túy Loan River occupied by Company A, 1st Battalion, 1st Marines partially overrunning the position. Marine reinforcements arrived and drove off the VC killing 57 and capturing one for the loss of 16 Marines killed.

== November ==
2 November

Norman Morrison a 31 year old Quaker died of burns suffered when he set himself on fire in front of The Pentagon, in protest against the war. Morrison was holding his one-year-old daughter as he doused himself in kerosene, and was reportedly still holding her as he began to burn, letting the child go after horrified onlookers yelled 'Drop the baby!" The child was rescued, unharmed but Morrison was dead on arrival at the Fort Myer dispensary. Morrison had set himself ablaze 50 yards (46 m) from, and within sight of, the office of McNamara, who would write 30 years later, "Morrison's death was a tragedy not only for his family, but also for me and the country." North Vietnam would memorialize him with a postage stamp.

3 November

In a memorandum to Johnson, McNamara estimated total communist forces in South Vietnam as having increased to 230,000, including 71,000 VC main force, 40,000 political cadre, 110,000 guerrillas and 20,000 PAVN soldiers. McNamara anticipated that these totals would increase.

4 November

Photojournalist Dickey Chapelle died from a shrapnel wound caused by a VC booby-trap while on patrol with a Marine platoon during Operation Black Ferret, a search and destroy operation 16 km south of Chu Lai. She became the first female war correspondent to be killed in Vietnam, as well as the first American female reporter to be killed in action.

5 November

Ho Thi Que a 38 year old ARVN Ranger known as "The Tiger Lady of South Vietnam", was killed during an argument with her husband, Major Nguyen Van Dan.

5–8 November

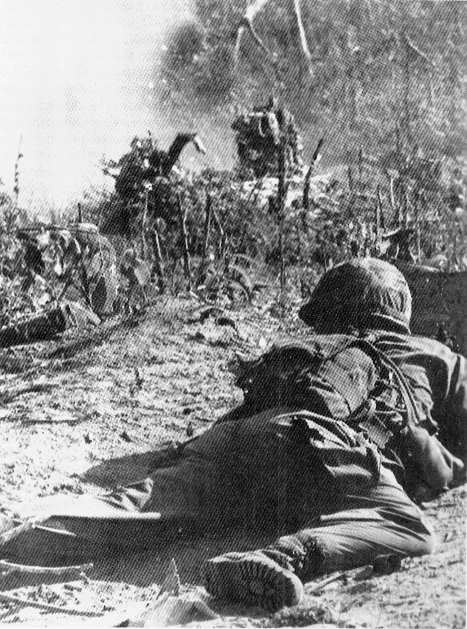
Soldiers of the 173rd Airborne Brigade under fire during Operation Hump

Operation Hump was a search and destroy operation by the 173rd Airborne Brigade, in War Zone D north of Biên Hòa. 1 RAR deployed south of the Đồng Nai River while the 1st Battalion, 503rd Infantry, conducted a helicopter assault on an LZ northwest of the Đồng Nai and Song Be rivers. The operation resulted in 403 VC, 49 U.S. and two Australians killed.

8 November

The Battle of Gang Toi was fought between 1 RAR and the VC. The battle occurred when 1 RAR found a VC bunker system in the Gang Toi Hills, in northern Biên Hòa Province. The battle resulted in six VC killed and five captured and two Australians killed.

The Republic of Korea Army Capital Division completed its landing in South Vietnam to participate in the war. The Capital Division was stationed at Qui Nhơn in Bình Định Province on the central coast of South Vietnam. With the Koreans in Qui Nhơn, a brigade of the U.S. 1st Infantry Division moved inland to protect Highway 19, which led to Pleiku in the Central Highlands. The South Korean 2nd Marine Brigade was stationed at the port city of Nha Trang.

10–18 November

Battalion Landing Team 2nd Battalion, 7th Marines and the 3rd Battalion Vietnamese Marine Corps conducted Operation Blue Marlin which began with an amphibious assault north of Tam Kỳ. The initial results were negligible as the VC had apparently withdrawn two days previously. On 16 November phase 2 of the operation began with 3rd Battalion, 3rd Marines conducting an amphibious assault south of Hội An to link up with ARVN forces. The VC generally avoided contact, but 25 VC were killed and 15 captured for the loss of two ARVN killed.

12 November

In the Battle of Ap Bau Bang two regiments from the VC 9th Division attacked a night defensive position of the United States 2nd Battalion, 2nd Infantry Regiment at Ap Bàu Bàng, 25 km north of Thủ Dầu Một. The battle resulted in 146 VC killed and a further 50 estimated killed and 20 U.S. killed.

Peter Hunting, an American member of the International Voluntary Service, was killed in a VC ambush in the Mekong Delta, becoming the first American civilian volunteer to be killed in the war.

14–18 November

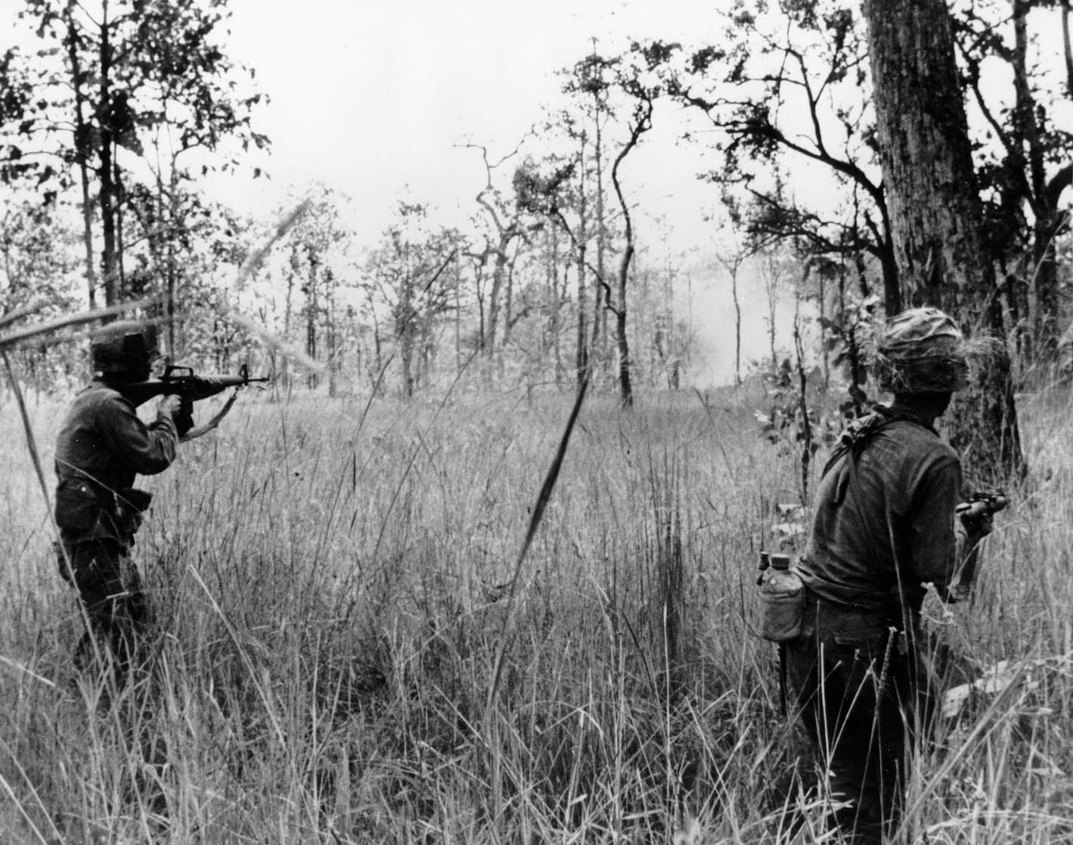
1st Cavalry Division soldiers during the Battle of Ia Drang

In the Battle of Ia Drang for the first time, the U.S. Army and PAVN met head-on in a major engagement, with the ARVN playing only a minor role. Casualties were heavy on both sides: in the fighting at LZ X-Ray (14–6 November) the PAVN lost 634 killed and six captured with a further 1,215 estimated killed, for U.S. losses of 79 killed; in the ambush at LZ Albany (17 November) the U.S. lost 151 killed while claiming 403 PAVN killed. For Westmoreland, the battle was a victory for U.S. firepower and mobility in a war of attrition in which the U.S. attempted to kill more communist troops than could be replaced. However, in the words of Joe Galloway, a journalist awarded a Bronze Star for his participation in the battle, Ia Drang was "the battle that convinced Ho Chi Minh he could win." The communists would "grind down the Americans" as they had the French in the 1940s and early '50s in the Indochina War.

14–22 November

Operation Bushmaster was a search and destroy operation conducted by the 3rd Brigade, 1st Infantry Division south of the Michelin Rubber Plantation in Bình Dương Province. The operation resulted in 245 VC killed.

17–9 November

The VC 1st Regiment overran Hiệp Đức District resulting in 174 Regional Force defenders missing and 315 weapons lost. 30 Marine UH-34D helicopters, supported by fixed-wing attack aircraft, lifted 788 ARVN troops to relieve the garrison. Two ARVN battalions killed 141 VC and captured 87 weapons while suffering 33 killed. American advisors with the ARVN estimated that Marine air support had accounted for another 300 VC killed. However the ARVN had to withdraw from the area to counter a VC attack on Thach Tru.

21–4 November

3rd Battalion, 7th Marines began reinforcing the 37th Ranger battalion which had come under attack by the PAVN 18th Regiment at Thach Tru about 20 miles (32 km) south of Quang Ngai. The Rangers had lost 71 killed and two missing while VC losses were 175 killed by U.S. body count and three VC captured. When the Marines landed, they secured the landing zones, occupied night defensive positions and early the next morning cleared the critical terrain, capturing 17 VC and killing three, Marine losses were two killed.

24 November

A U.S. military spokesman reported that 240 American servicemen had been killed in the war during the week of 14–20 November, in the deadliest week of the war for Americans up to that time. During the years 1961–4, there had been 244 U.S. deaths, only slightly more than the casualties for the week. The newest casualties raised the toll to 1,335 dead and 6,131 wounded.

25 November

General Lon Nol, Chief of Staff of the Royal Cambodian Army, concluded an agreement with Luo Ruiqing, the Chief of Staff of China's People's Liberation Army, permitting the passage of PAVN/VC troops through its border regions and allowing China to ship war supplies to Vietnam through Cambodian territory. Lon Nol had traveled to Beijing at the request of Prince Sihanouk.

27 November

The "March on Washington for Peace in Vietnam", organized by the "Committee for a SANE Nuclear Policy" (SANE), attracted a crowd of almost 35,000 demonstrators who picketed the White House, then moved on toward the Washington Monument. It was the largest public protest against U.S. involvement in Vietnam up to that time. The leaders of SANE were concerned about the public perception of the antiwar movement, so they asked that protesters only carry signs with "authorized slogans", and not to demand immediate withdrawal, nor to burn the American flag.

In an act which it said was being done as a "response to the friendly sentiments of the American people against the war in South Vietnam", the VC released U.S. Army Sergeant George E. Smith and Specialist E-5 Claude E. McClure, who had both been captured on 24 November 1963. Vietnam Communist Party official Le Duc Tho escorted Smith and McClure across the border from North Vietnam into Cambodia, freeing both men after two years as prisoners of war. Smith and McClure would travel across neutral Cambodia on their own and would address a press conference in Phnom Penh on 30 November, praising their captors and American antiwar protesters, and criticizing the war effort. On 27 December the U.S. military announced that Smith and McClure would face court martial for aiding the enemy.

PAVN forces attacked the ARVN 7th Regiment, 5th Division in the Michelin Rubber Plantation killing most of the Regiment and five U.S. advisers.

28 November

In response to Johnson's call for "more flags" in South Vietnam, Philippines President-elect Ferdinand Marcos announced that he would send troops to help fight in South Vietnam.

30 November

After meeting with Westmoreland in South Vietnam, McNamara recommended in a memorandum to Johnson that the number of U.S. troops in South Vietnam should be increased to about 400,000 in 1966 and possibly by an additional 200,000 in 1967. McNamara estimated that 1,000 Americans per month would die in the war and that "the odds are even" that the U.S. would prevail. McNamara recommended a pause in bombing North Vietnam of 3 to 4 weeks duration to try to find a way to end the war before undertaking the military buildup. Lodge, Westmoreland, and CINCPAC opposed the bombing halt.

== December ==
In an article in Reader's Digest, former Vice President Nixon opposed negotiations to end the war. "There can be no substitute for victory when the objective is the defeat of communist aggression", he said.

1–6 December

Operation Bushmaster II was conducted by the U.S. 3rd Brigade, 1st Infantry Division in the Michelin Rubber Plantation. The operation resulted in 318 VC killed and 27 captured and 44 U.S. killed and three missing.

3 December

A U.S. Marine at Da Nang allegedly vandalized the Khue Bac Pagoda by beheading the shrine's golden image of Gautama Buddha. By 8 December 500 Buddhist protesters marched through the streets of Da Nang after Khue Bac's principal monk, Thich Giac Ngo, threatened to disembowel himself to atone for allowing the Buddha to be destroyed. U.S. Ambassador Lodge promised to fully investigate the incident and to compensate the monastery for the damage.

4 December

The VC bombed the Metropole Bachelor Enlisted Quarters in Saigon killing seven Vietnamese civilians, one U.S. Marine and one New Zealand soldier and injuring 175 others. The VC claim to have killed 200 Americans.

5 December

Company C, 1st Battalion, 7th Marines engaged 70 VC on the Trung Phan peninsula 6 miles (9.7 km) southeast of Chu Lai Air Base killing 38 VC and capturing seven.

5–7 December

In Operation Dagger Thrust V the Marines Shore Landing Force 2nd Battalion, 1st Marines landed at the Phu Thu village 40 miles (64 km) north of Qui Nhơn and engaged a VC force killing 26 VC and capturing 38 suspects for the loss of three Marines killed.

5 December – 11 November 1968

Operation Tiger Hound was a covert USAF 2nd Air Division, later Seventh Air Force and U.S. Navy Task Force 77 aerial interdiction campaign conducted in southeastern Laos.

8–20 December

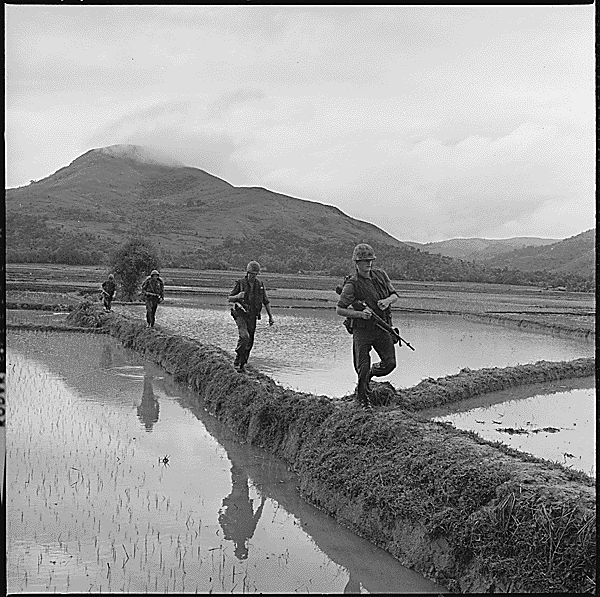
U.S. Marines from H Company, 2nd Battalion, 7th Marines on patrol during Operation Harvest Moon

Operation Harvest Moon/Lien Ket 18 was a U.S. 1st Marine Division and ARVN 2nd Division search and destroy operation in the Quế Sơn Valley in western Quảng Tín Province. The operation resulted in 407 VC killed and 33 captured and 45 Marines killed and 90 ARVN killed and 91 missing.

10 December

A report in the New York Times indicated that bombing of North Vietnam was having little impact on the war.

Senator Gruening again criticized U.S. involvement in Vietnam stating that the U.S. had made no commitment to defend South Vietnam, contrary to Johnson's claims that previous administrations had pledged to defend it. He described the conflict as a civil war that was irrelevant to U.S. security interests.

11 December

A USAF C-123 Provider transport plane crashed with 81 ARVN Airborne and four American officers on board. There were no survivors and the wreckage was not located until 23 December.

12 December

Two VC platoons killed 23 South Vietnamese canal construction workers asleep in a Buddhist Pagoda in Tan Huong, Dinh Tuong Province, seven others were wounded.

15 December

USAF planes destroy the Uông Bí thermal power plant which provided approximately 15% of North Vietnam's power.

16–21 December

150-200 VC supported by mortars attacked an 81-strong Marine Reconnaissance, Special Forces, CIDG and Nung force on a hilltop position in Ba Tơ District. The defenders were forced to disperse and evade losing three Marines, one Special Forces and 10 CIDG killed.

18 December

Operation Game Warden (Task Force 116) began. It was a U.S. Navy and Republic of Vietnam Navy operation in the Mekong Delta to patrol the rivers and coastal waters, prevent the infiltration of soldiers and supplies from North Vietnam and deny the VC access to the waterways.

After a visit to South Vietnam, Marine Corps General Victor Krulak wrote a report expressing disagreement with General Westmoreland's strategy of attrition. It was "wasteful of American lives, promising a protracted, strength-sapping battle with small likelihood of a successful outcome." Krulak proposed instead a focus on a pacification program to provide village security plus increased air strikes.

For the first time since the beginning of the war, Saigon came under a VC mortar attack. One of the first rounds exploded inside the Kieu Tong Muo police precinct station, about 4 miles (6.4 km) from the city center, although there were no casualties.

22 December

Second lieutenant Henry Howe jr. was convicted by a court martial of breaching Article 88 of the Uniform Code of Military Justice for attending an antiwar protest in El Paso on 6 November in civilian clothes carrying a sign reading "Let's have more than a choice between petty ignorant facists in 1968" and "End Johnson's facist aggression in Vietnam". He was sentenced to dismissal from the service, forfeiture of all pay and two years of hard labor. The sentence was later reduced to confinement for one year.

24 December

President Johnson announced a halt in the bombing of North Vietnam and initiated a worldwide diplomatic effort to persuade North Vietnam to negotiate an end to the war. The Department of Defense opposed the bombing halt.

27 December

Ho Chi Minh addressed the Communist Party Central Committee in Hanoi. Ho said that "politics" was the weak point of the American and South Vietnamese enemy, and the domestic situation of the United States will not permit the U.S. to utilize its military and economic power in South Vietnam. The Committee decided that the communist forces in South Vietnam should seek a "decisive victory within a relatively short period of time", but must prepare to defend itself if the U.S. expands its war effort.

Company B, 1st Battalion, 9th Marines patrolling in Quang Ha, 11 miles (18 km) south of Da Nang Air Base was ambushed by a VC unit but called in supporting forces and killed 41 VC for the loss of two Marines killed.

30 December

VC assassinated Tu Chung, editor of the Chính Luận (Political Discussion) newspaper outside his home in Saigon.

31 December

U.S. military personnel in South Vietnam now totaled 184,314, compared to 23,310 a year earlier. U.S. casualties in 1965 totaled 1,928 dead, compared to 216 in the 1964. North Vietnam claimed to have shot down 834 U.S. aircraft during the year. South Vietnamese military forces totaled 514,000, including the ARVN and the Regional and Popular Force militias. The South Vietnamese armed forces suffered 11,242 killed in action, a five-fold increase in battle deaths since 1960. 93,000 persons deserted from the South Vietnam's armed forces in 1965.

At year's end, the PAVN numbered 400,000, compared to 195,000 a year earlier. VPAF and air defense capabilities were greatly expanded. 50,000 PAVN cadre and soldiers infiltrated South Vietnam during 1965, equal to the total number infiltrated from 1959 through 1964. Group 559, charged with transporting supplies down the Ho Chi Minh Trail to supply PAVN/VC troops in both South Vietnam and Laos, was expanded to 24,400 personnel and moved almost as much tonnage south in 1965 as it had in the preceding six years.

Conscription into the United States armed forces in 1965 was 230,991 men, compared to 112,386 in 1964.

== Year in numbers ==
Armed Force	Strength	KIA	Military costs – 1965	Military costs – 2025
South Vietnam	514,000	11,200
United States	184,314	1,928	US$20 billion	US$ 204,329,460,000
South Korea	20,620
Thailand	16
Australia	1,557
Philippines	72
New Zealand	119
Viet Cong and North Vietnam	1,000,000

== See also ==
- List of allied military operations of the Vietnam War (1965)
