= Cai Lậy =

Cai Lậy is the name of the following geographical location in Mekong Delta, Vietnam:

- Cai Lậy, Đồng Tháp: ward in Đồng Tháp province
- Cai Lậy, Tiền Giang: former district-level town belonging to Tiền Giang province (these are now Cai Lậy ward, Nhị Quý ward, Thanh Hòa ward, Mỹ Phước Tây ward and Tân Phú commune, all belonging to Đồng Tháp province)
- Cai Lậy district: former district belonging to Tiền Giang province (these are now Thạnh Phú commune, Mỹ Thành commune, Bình Phú ward, Hiệp Đức commune, Ngũ Hiệp commune and Long Tiên commune, all belonging to Đồng Tháp province)
- Former Cai Lậy township, dissolved in 2014 to form the new wards of Cai Lậy district-level town
