= Phú Cường (disambiguation) =

Phú Cường could be:

- Phú Cường: commune in Đồng Tháp province.
- Diocese of Phú Cường

Former places same name

- Phú Cường: ward of Thủ Dầu Một provincial city in Bình Dương province (today part of Thủ Dầu Một ward, Hồ Chí Minh city).
- Phú Cường: commune of Ba Vì district in Hanoi capital municipality (today part of Cổ Đô commune, Hanoi capital municipality).
- Phú Cường: commune of Sóc Sơn district in Hanoi capital municipality (today part of Nội Bài commune, Hanoi capital municipality).
- Phú Cường: commune of Hưng Yên provincial city in Hưng Yên province (today part of Sơn Nam ward, Hưng Yên province).
- Phú Cường: commune in Định Quán district of Đồng Nai province (today part of Thống Nhất commune, Đồng Nai municipality).
- Phú Cường: commune in Tam Nông district, Đồng Tháp province (today part of Phú Cường commune, Đồng Tháp province).
- Phú Cường: commune in Tân Lạc district, Hòa Bình province.
- Phú Cường: commune in Đại Từ district, Thái Nguyên province.
- Phú Cường: commune in Cai Lậy district, Tiền Giang province (today part of Thạnh Phú commune, Đồng Tháp province).
