= Long Tiên =

Commune in Đồng Tháp province, Vietnam

- Commune
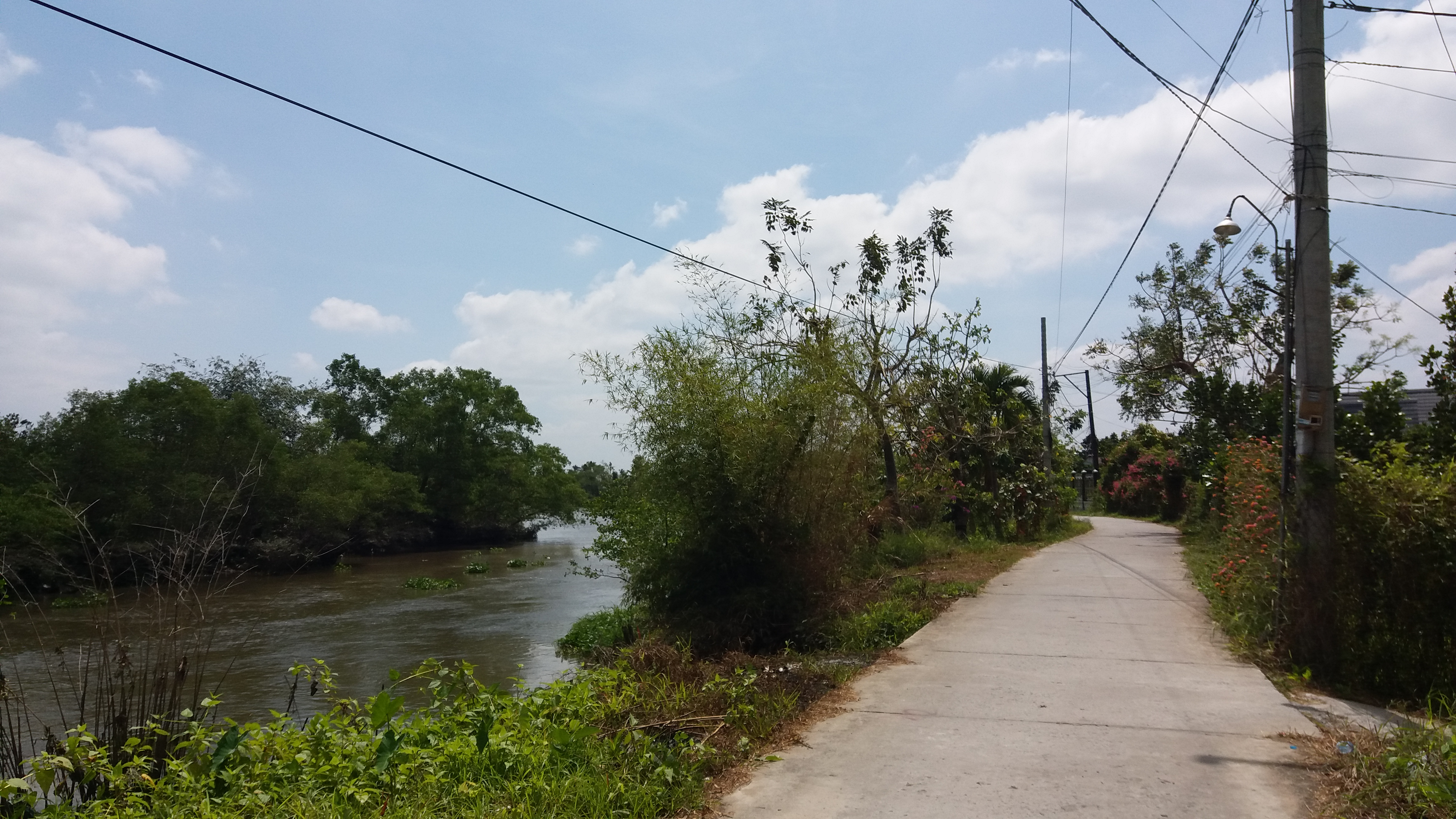
- A rural view
- Interactive map of Long Tiên
- Country: Vietnam
- Region: Mekong Delta
- Province: Đồng Tháp
- Establish: June 16, 2025

Area
  - Total: 44.64 km^{2} (17.24 sq mi)

Population
  - Total: 43,997 people
  - Density: 985.6/km^{2} (2,553/sq mi)
- Time zone: UTC+07:00

Long Tiên is a commune in Đồng Tháp province, Vietnam. It is one of 102 communes and wards in the province.

== Geography ==
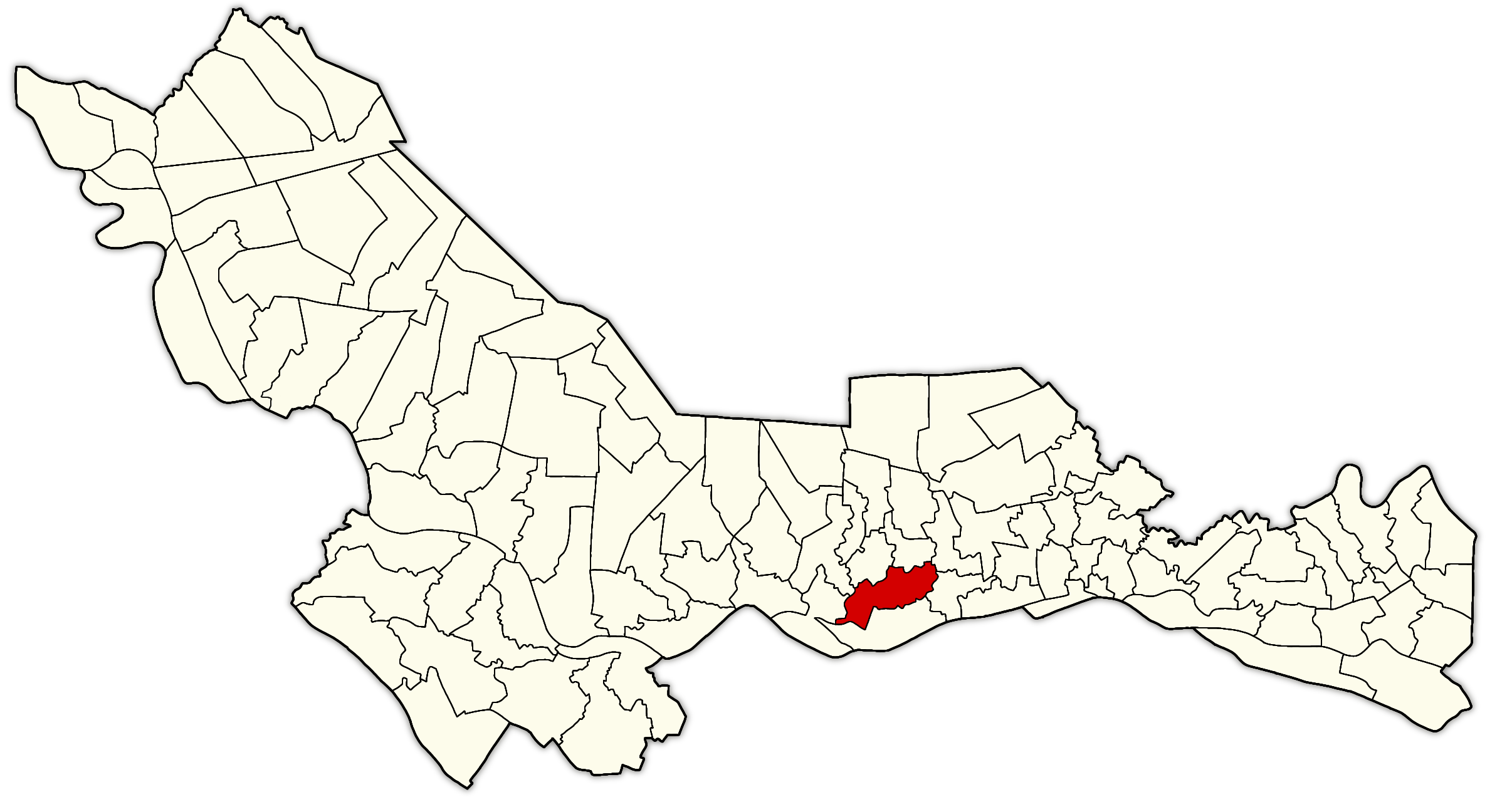
Location of Long Tiên commune on Đồng Tháp province map (highlight in red).

Long Tiên is a commune located in the eastern part of Đồng Tháp province, 55 km east of Cao Lãnh ward and 25 km west of Mỹ Tho ward. It borders Ngũ Hiệp commune to the south, Hiệp Đức commune and Bình Phú ward to the west, Cai Lậy and Nhị Quý wards to the north and Bình Trưng commune, Vĩnh Kim ward to the east.

== Administrative divisions ==
Long Tiên commune is divided into 17 hamlets: Hưng Bình, Hưng Long, Hưng Nghĩa, Hưng Nhơn, Long Trung, Mỹ Hậu, Mỹ Hòa, Mỹ Hưng, Mỹ Lợi A, Mỹ Lợi B, Mỹ Long, Mỹ Lương, Mỹ Phú, Mỹ Thạnh, Mỹ Thuận and Tân Long.

== History ==
Prior to 2025, the area of what is now Long Tiên commune included Long Trung, Long Tiên, and Mỹ Long communes in Cai Lậy district, Tiền Giang province.

On June 12, 2025, the National Assembly of Vietnam issued Resolution No. 202/2025/QH15 on the reorganization of provincial-level administrative units. Accordingly:

- Đồng Tháp province was established by merging the entire area and population of Đồng Tháp province and Tiền Giang province.
- After the reorganization, the new Đồng Tháp province will have an area of 5,938.64 km² and a population of 4,370,046 people in 2025.
- The communes of Long Tiên, Long Trung, and Mỹ Long are located in Đồng Tháp province.

On June 16, 2025, the Standing Committee of the National Assembly of Vietnam issued Resolution No. 1663/NQ-UBTVQH15 on the reorganization of commune-level administrative units in Đồng Tháp province. Accordingly:

- Long Tiên commune was established by merging the entire area and total population of Long Trung, Long Tiên and Mỹ Long commune (formerly part of Cai Lậy district).

== Economy ==
Agriculture remains the main economic sector in Long Tiên, primarily rice cultivation and fruit trees. As of 2015, Long Tien had 1260 hectares of fruit trees, including 1000 hectares of durian trees. In 2020, drought and saltwater intrusion killed a large number of durian trees. In addition, this commune also has a significant area of star apple, approximately 35 hectares in 2010.
