= Mỹ Thành =

Commune in Đồng Tháp province, Vietnam

- Commune
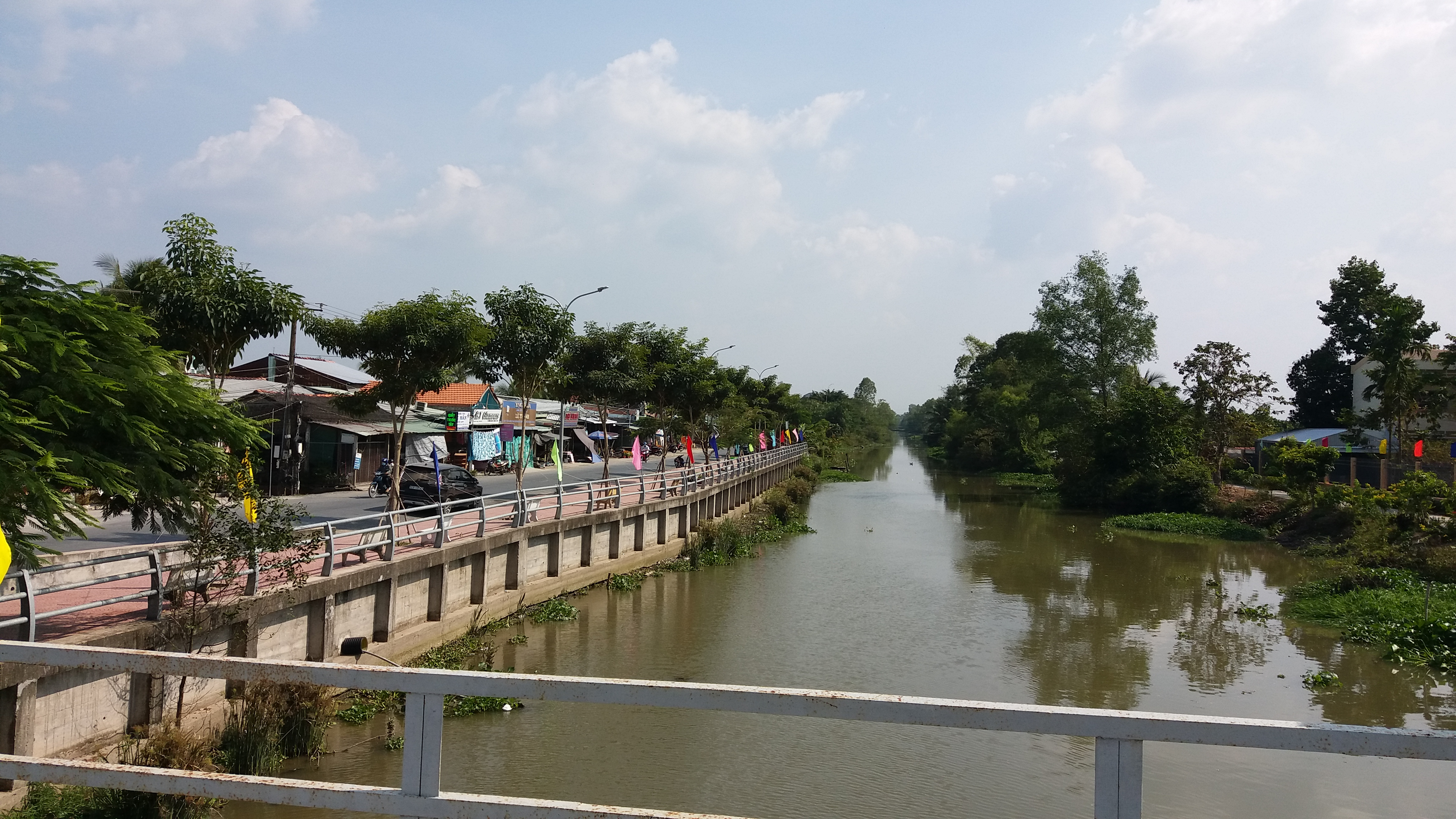
- Phú Nhuận market
- Interactive map of Mỹ Thành
- Country: Vietnam
- Region: Mekong Delta
- Province: Đồng Tháp
- Established: June 16, 2025

Area
  - Total: 52.30 km^{2} (20.19 sq mi)

Population (2025)
  - Total: 35,768
  - Density: 683.9/km^{2} (1,771/sq mi)
- Time zone: UTC+07:00

Mỹ Thành is a commune in Đồng Tháp province, Vietnam. It is one of 102 communes and wards in the province.

== Geography ==
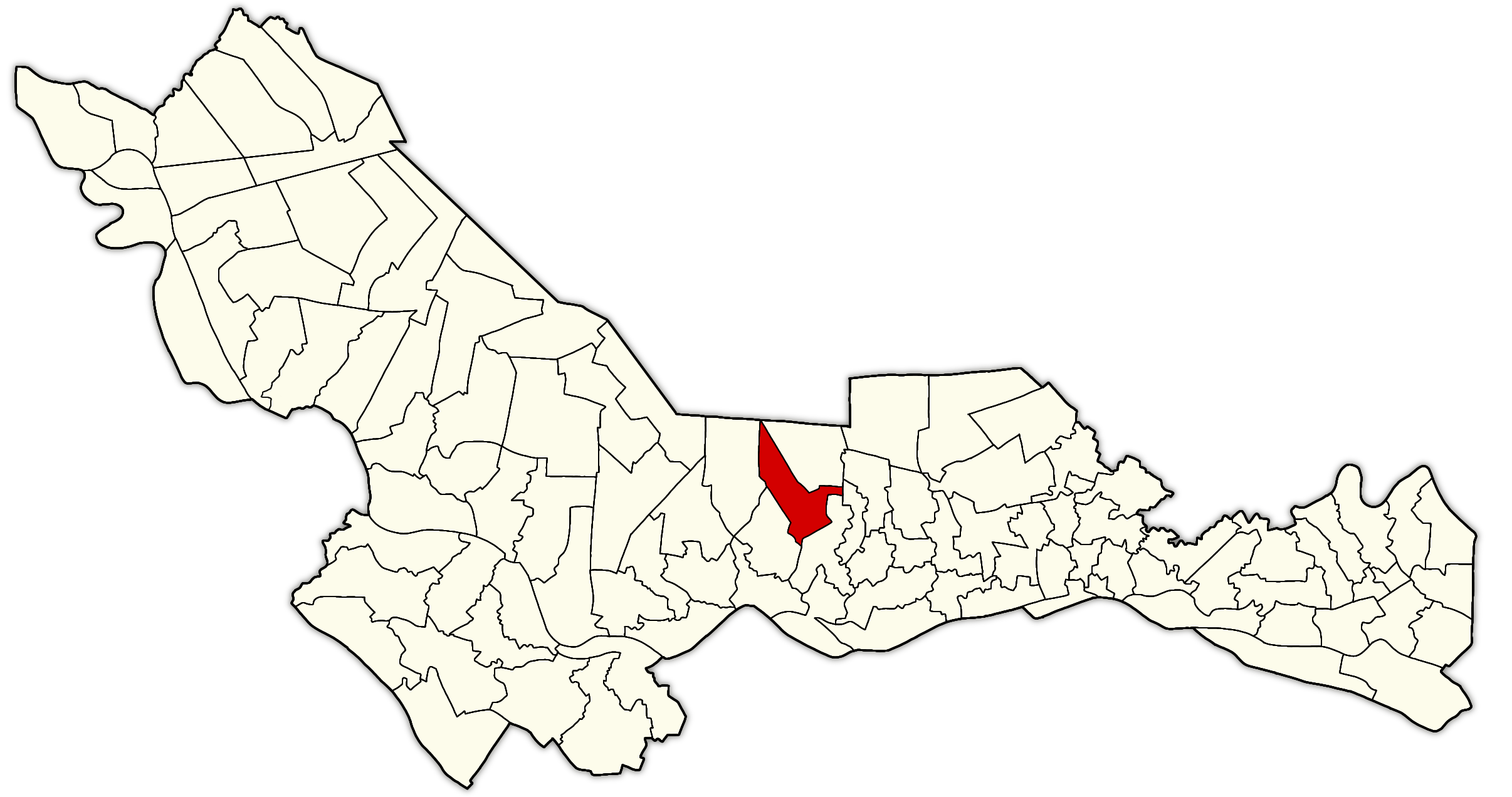
Location of Mỹ Thành commune on Đồng Tháp province map highlight in red).

Mỹ Thành is a commune located in the eastern part of Đồng Tháp province, 45 km east of Cao Lãnh ward and 38 km northwest of Mỹ Tho ward. It borders Hậu Mỹ commune to the west, Thạnh Phú commune to the north and northeast, Thanh Hòa ward to the east, Bình Phú ward to the southeast and south, Hội Cư commune to the southwest.

== Administrative divisions ==
Mỹ Thành commune has 14 hamlets: 1, 2, 3, 4, 5, 6, 7, 8, 9, 10, Phú Bình, Phú Hòa, Phú Lợi, Phú Tiểu.

== History ==
Prior to 2025, the area that is now Mỹ Thành commune was formerly Phú Nhuận, Mỹ Thành Bắc, and Mỹ Thành Nam communes in Cai Lậy district of Tiền Giang province.

On June 12, 2025, the Vietnamese National Assembly issued Resolution No. 202/2025/QH15 on the reorganization of provincial-level administrative units. Dong Thap province was established by merging the entire area and population of Đồng Tháp province and Tiền Giang province.

On June 16, 2025, the Standing Committee of the National Assembly of Vietnam issued Resolution No. 1663/NQ-UBTVQH15 on the reorganization of commune-level administrative units in Đồng Tháp province. Mỹ Thành commune was established by merging the entire area and population of Mỹ Thành Bắc, Mỹ Thành Nam and Phú Nhuận communes (formerly part of Cai Lậy district).
