= Hiệp Đức =

Hiệp Đức is the name given to several administrative units in Vietnam. Currently, this name is used for two communes in Đà Nẵng city and Đồng Tháp province.

- Hiệp Đức: commune of Đồng Tháp province.
- Hiệp Đức: commune of Đà Nẵng city.
- Hiệp Đức: former district of the former Quảng Nam province (today part of Đà Nẵng city).
- Hiệp Đức: former commune of Cai Lậy district in Tiền Giang province (today part of Hiệp Đức commune, Đồng Tháp province).
