= Sang vlog =

Vietnamese YouTuber (born 1995)

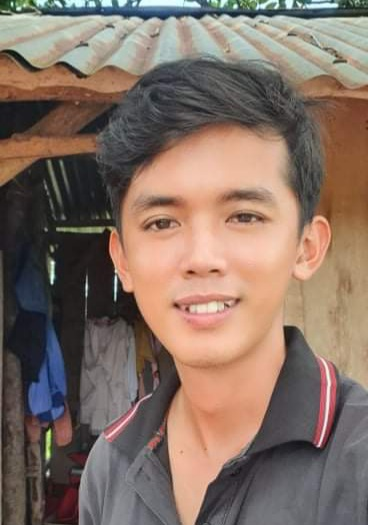
- Sang in 2021
- Born: Trần Văn Sang; January 5, 1995 (age 31); Dinh Quan, Dong Nai, Vietnam
- Occupation: YouTuber
- Spouse: Ngọc Mai
- Children: 1

YouTube information
- Channel: Sang vlog
- Years active: 2019–present
- Genres: Cuisine; Tourism; Challenge; Survival
- Subscribers: 5.11 million
- Views: 1.8 billion
- Last updated: 19 August 2026

Sang vlog (born January 5, 1995, real name is Trần Văn Sang) is a Vietnamese YouTuber. Famous for his content on food and survival, Sang Vlog is often referred to as the poorest YouTuber in Vietnam.

According to statistics from Social Blade, a website specializing in social media and YouTube statistics, Sang Vlog's channel ranked 80th in the top 100 most subscribed channels in Vietnam as of September 28, 2021.

== Biography ==
Trần Văn Sang was born on January 5, 1995, in Dinh Quan, Dong Nai Province. Due to difficult family circumstances, he had to quit his job as a factory worker and return to his hometown to work as a construction laborer to care for his sick mother.

On March 18, 2019, he started as a YouTuber with the channel Sang TV, focusing on hunting, gathering, and cooking. The channel garnered hundreds of thousands of views. However, monetization was denied.

In 2020, Sang continued his YouTube career with another channel, Sang Vlog, each video reaching millions of views. Sang Vlog's videos show him and his mother living in a thatched house on a hill. This led his followers to call him the poorest YouTuber in Vietnam.

Currently, Sang Vlog is one of the highest-earning Vietnamese YouTubers, with more engaging content and visually appealing videos. His monthly income reaches hundreds of millions of VND. As of September 27, 2021, Sang vlog channel had 4 million subscribers and over 1 billion views.

== Controversy ==
=== Hunting rare animals ===
In 2020, a video titled "Thử thách 24 giờ bên bờ hồ" showed Sang catching several monitor lizards to prepare as food. These are rare animals, and hunting them is prohibited in Vietnam and many other parts of the world. Authorities visited his home to verify the images in the video. He subsequently deleted the video and apologized to viewers. However, Sang still faced strong backlash from the online community, especially from animal lovers.

=== Accused of dishonesty and feigning poverty ===
In most of his videos, Sang always talks about his impoverished family background. However, many viewers noticed inconsistencies and accused him of being dishonest about his family background, the equipment he used in filming his vlogs, and his wild past, claiming he had a team behind him staging it all. Sang then made a separate video to address these rumors.

=== Violation of YouTube's policies. ===
In September 2021, the Sang vlog channel was penalized by YouTube for violating the platform's content and community policies due to the appearance of children in its videos. Additionally, many of the channel's videos received negative ratings under YouTube's rules because they contained scenes of slaughter and hunting.
