= Tân Phước 2 =

- Commune
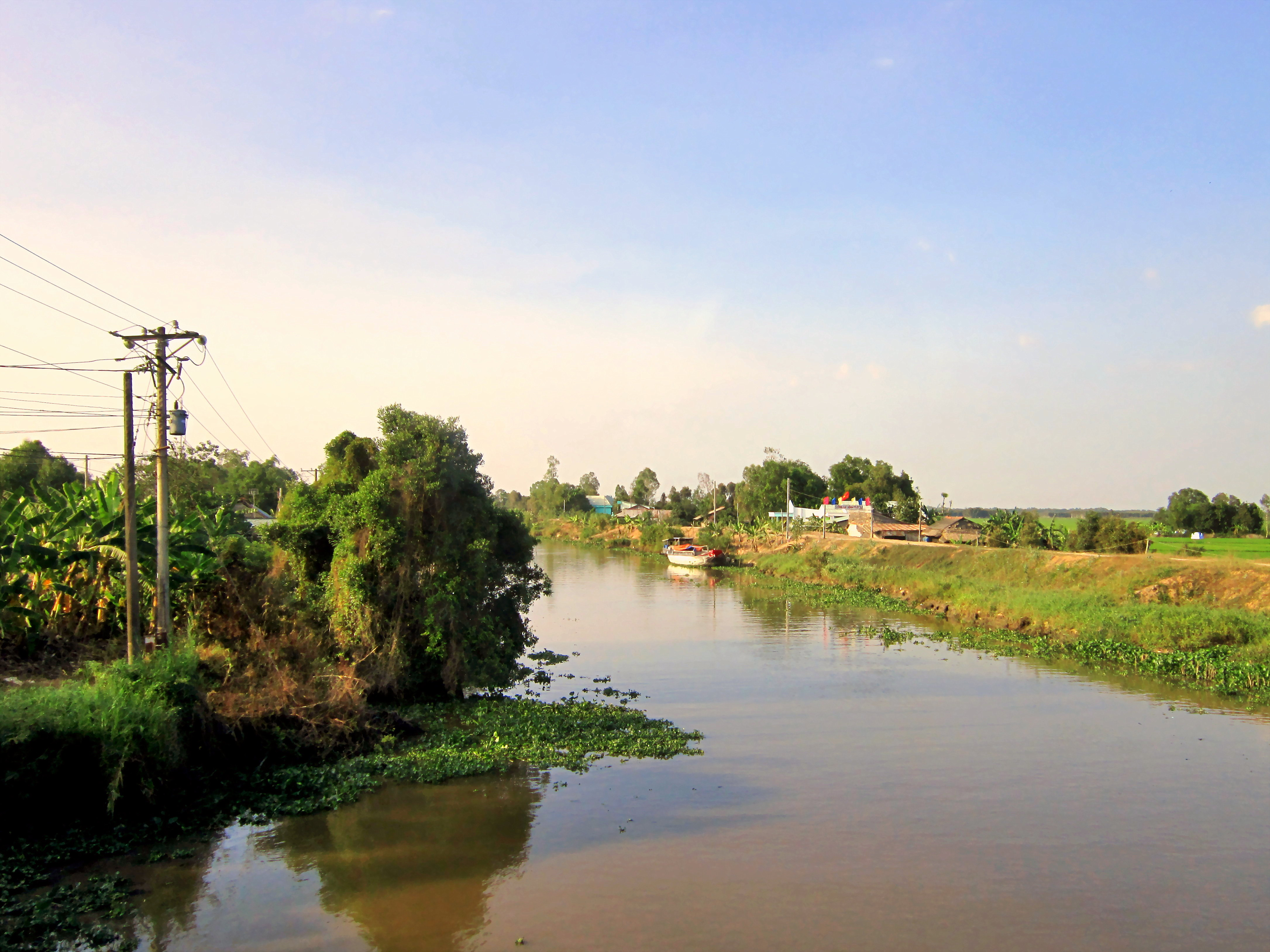
- A rural view in the commune
- Interactive map of Tân Phước 2
- Country: Vietnam
- Province: Đồng Tháp
- Establish: June 16, 2025

Area
  - Total: 89.40 km^{2} (34.52 sq mi)

Population (2025)
  - Total: 10,849 people
  - Density: 121.4/km^{2} (314.3/sq mi)
- Time zone: UTC+07:00

Tân Phước 2 is a commune in Đồng Tháp province, Vietnam. It is one of 102 communes and wards in the province.

== Geography ==
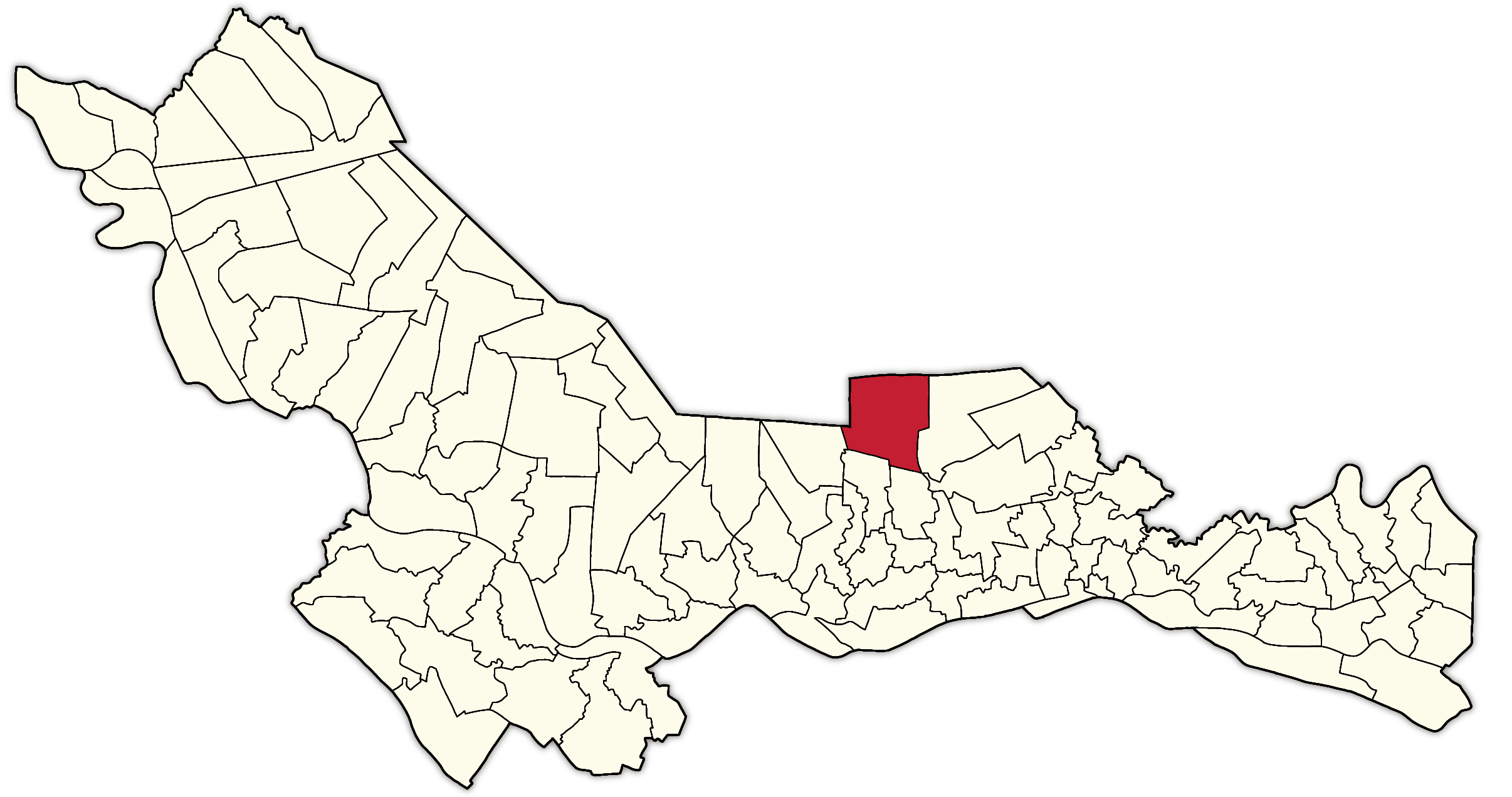
Location of Tân Phước 2 commune in Đồng Tháp province map (highlight in red).

Tân Phước 2 is a rural commune located in the eastern part of Đồng Tháp province, 75km east of Cao Lãnh ward and about 40km northwest of Mỹ Tho ward. The commune has a geographical location:

- To the north, it borders Thạnh Hóa commune of Tây Ninh province.
- To the east, it borders Tân Phước 1 commune.
- To the south, it borders Mỹ Phước Tây ward and Tân Phú commune.
- To the west, it borders Tân Thạnh commune of Tây Ninh province.
- To the southwest, it borders Thạnh Phú commune.

== History ==
Prior to 2025, Tân Phước 2 commune was formerly Thạnh Tân, Thạnh Hòa, and Tân Hòa Tây communes in Tân Phước district, Tiền Giang province.

On June 12, 2025, the National Assembly of Vietnam issued Resolution No. 202/2025/QH15 on the reorganization of provincial-level administrative units. Accordingly:

- Đồng Tháp province was established by merging the entire area and population of Đồng Tháp province and Tiền Giang province.

On June 16, 2025, the Standing Committee of the National Assembly of Vietnam issued Resolution No. 1663/NQ-UBTVQH15 on the reorganization of commune-level administrative units in Đồng Tháp province. Accordingly:

- Tân Phước 2 commune was established by merging the entire area and population of Thạnh Tân, Thạnh Hòa, and Tân Hòa Tây communes (formerly part of Tân Phước district).
