= Thống Nhất =

Thống Nhất may refer to several places in Vietnam, including:

- Thống Nhất, Phú Thọ, a ward of Phú Thọ Province
- Thống Nhất, Đồng Nai, a commune of Đồng Nai
- Thống Nhất district, a former district of Đồng Nai province
- Thống Nhất Stadium, a stadium in Ho Chi Minh City
