= Ngũ Hiệp =

Commune in Đồng Tháp province, Vietnam

- Commune
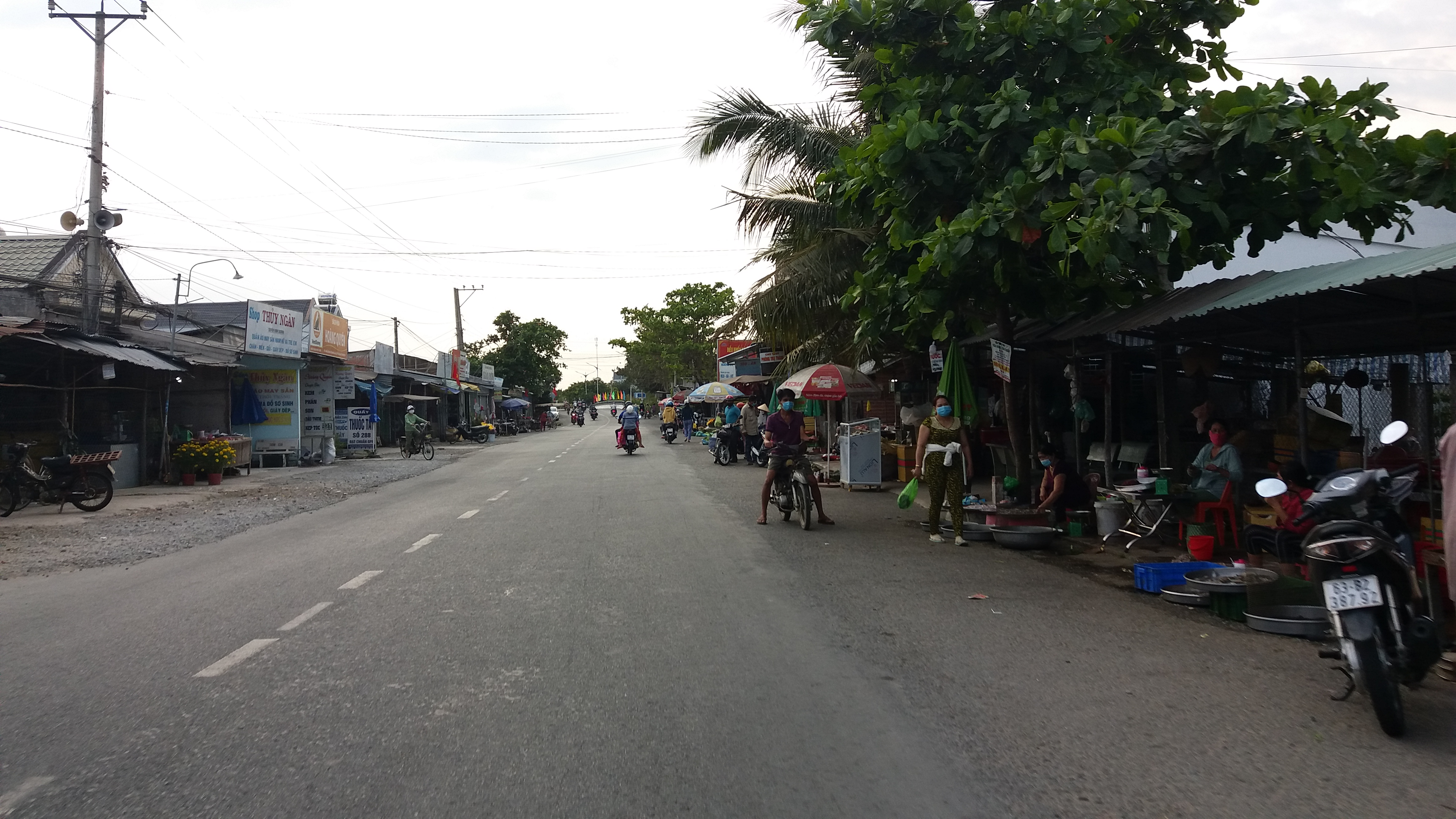
- Interactive map of Ngũ Hiệp
- Country: Vietnam
- Province: Đồng Tháp
- Establish: 16 June 2025

Area
  - Total: 47.94 km^{2} (18.51 sq mi)

Population (2025)
  - Total: 40,635 people
  - Density: 847.6/km^{2} (2,195/sq mi)
- Time zone: UTC+07:00 (Indochina Time)

Ngũ Hiệp is a commune in Đồng Tháp province, Vietnam. It is one of 102 communes and wards in the province following the 2025 Vietnamese administrative reforms.

== Geography ==
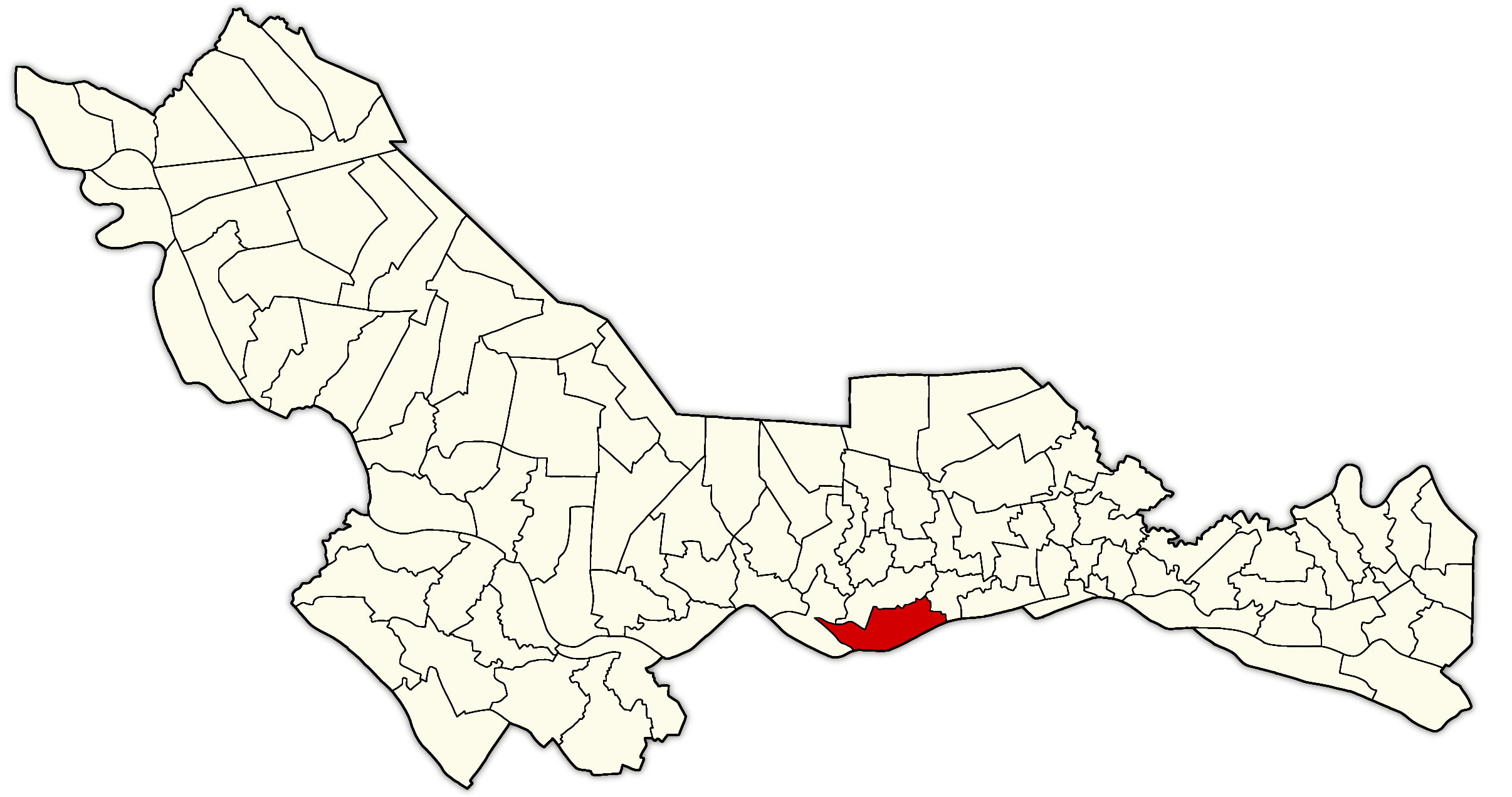
Location of Ngũ Hiệp commune on Đồng Tháp province map (highlight in red).

Ngũ Hiệp is a riverside commune along the Tiền river, located in the eastern part of Đồng Tháp province. The commune's territory includes both mainland and island areas. The commune has the following geographical location:

- To the north, it borders Long Tiên commune.
- To the south, it borders Vĩnh Long province.
- To the west, it borders Hiệp Đức commune.
- To the east, it borders Vĩnh Kim ward.

== History ==
Prior to 2025, Ngũ Hiệp commune was formerly Tam Bình and Ngũ Hiệp communes in Cai Lậy district, Tiền Giang province.

On 12 June 2025, the National Assembly of Vietnam issued Resolution No. 202/2025/QH15 on the reorganization of provincial-level administrative units. Accordingly:

- Đồng Tháp province was established by merging the entire area and population of Đồng Tháp province and Tiền Giang province.

On 16 June 2025, the Standing Committee of the National Assembly of Vietnam issued Resolution No. 1663/NQ-UBTVQH15 on the reorganization of commune-level administrative units in Dong Thap province. Accordingly:

- The commune of Ngũ Hiệp was established by merging the entire area and population of Tam Bình commune and Ngũ Hiệp commune (formerly part of Cai Lậy district).

== Economy ==
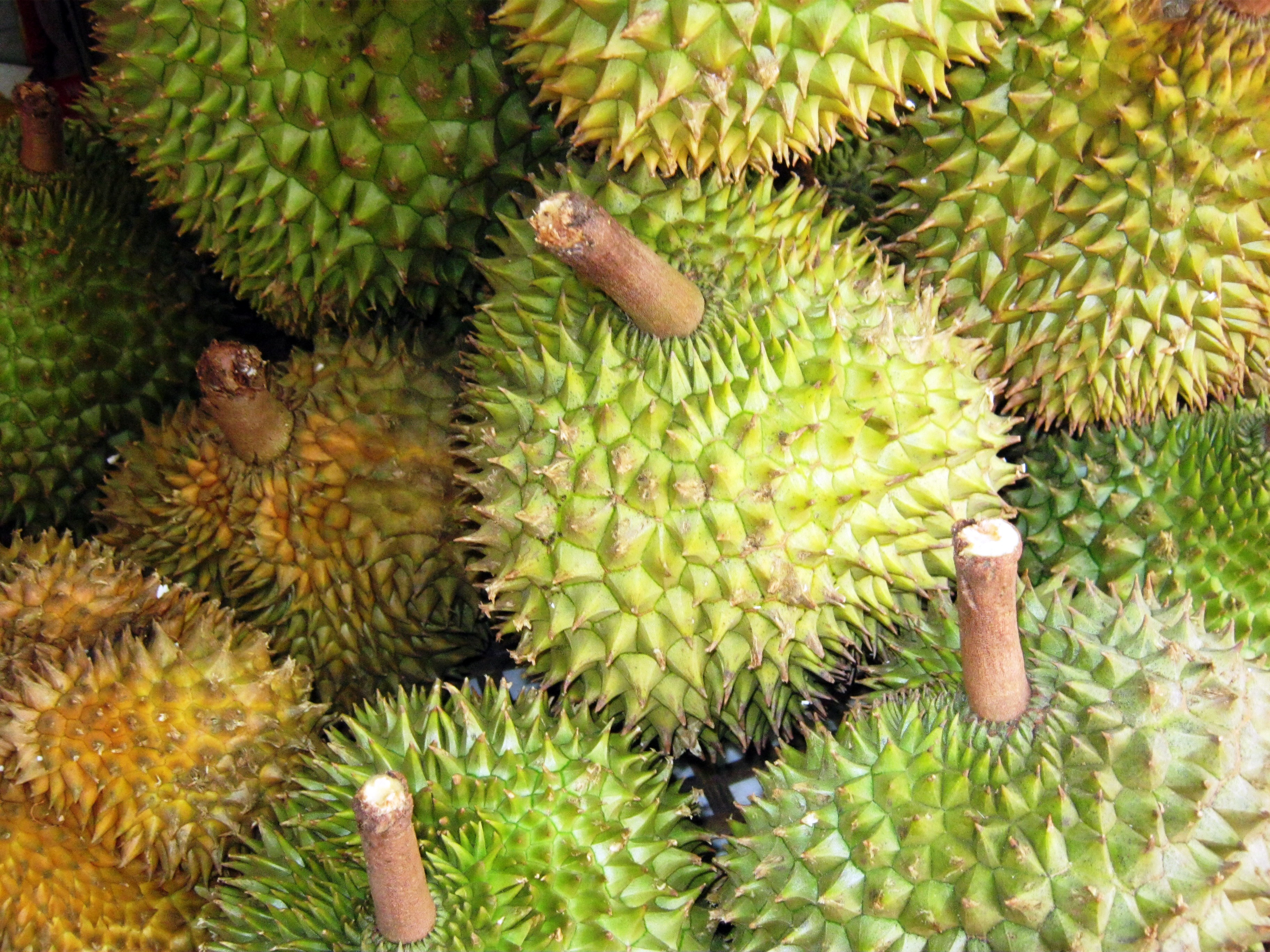
Durian

Ngũ Hiệp is a region specializing in durian cultivation, but it also grows rambutan, pomelo, jackfruit, and bananas, etc.. Durian is a highly valuable crop in the locality; the entire commune has 2,750 hectares of durian trees, with a yield of nearly 49,000 tons per year. Therefore, Ngũ Hiệp is known as the "durian kingdom".

== Traffic ==
The main roads running through Ngũ Hiệp commune are:

- Provincial route 868 runs in a north-south direction and forms a part boundary between Ngũ Hiệp commune and Long Tiên commune.
- Provincial route 864 runs west-east along a small branch of the Tiền river.
