= Thạnh Phú, Đồng Tháp =

Commune in Đồng Tháp province, Vietnam

Thạnh Phú
- Commune
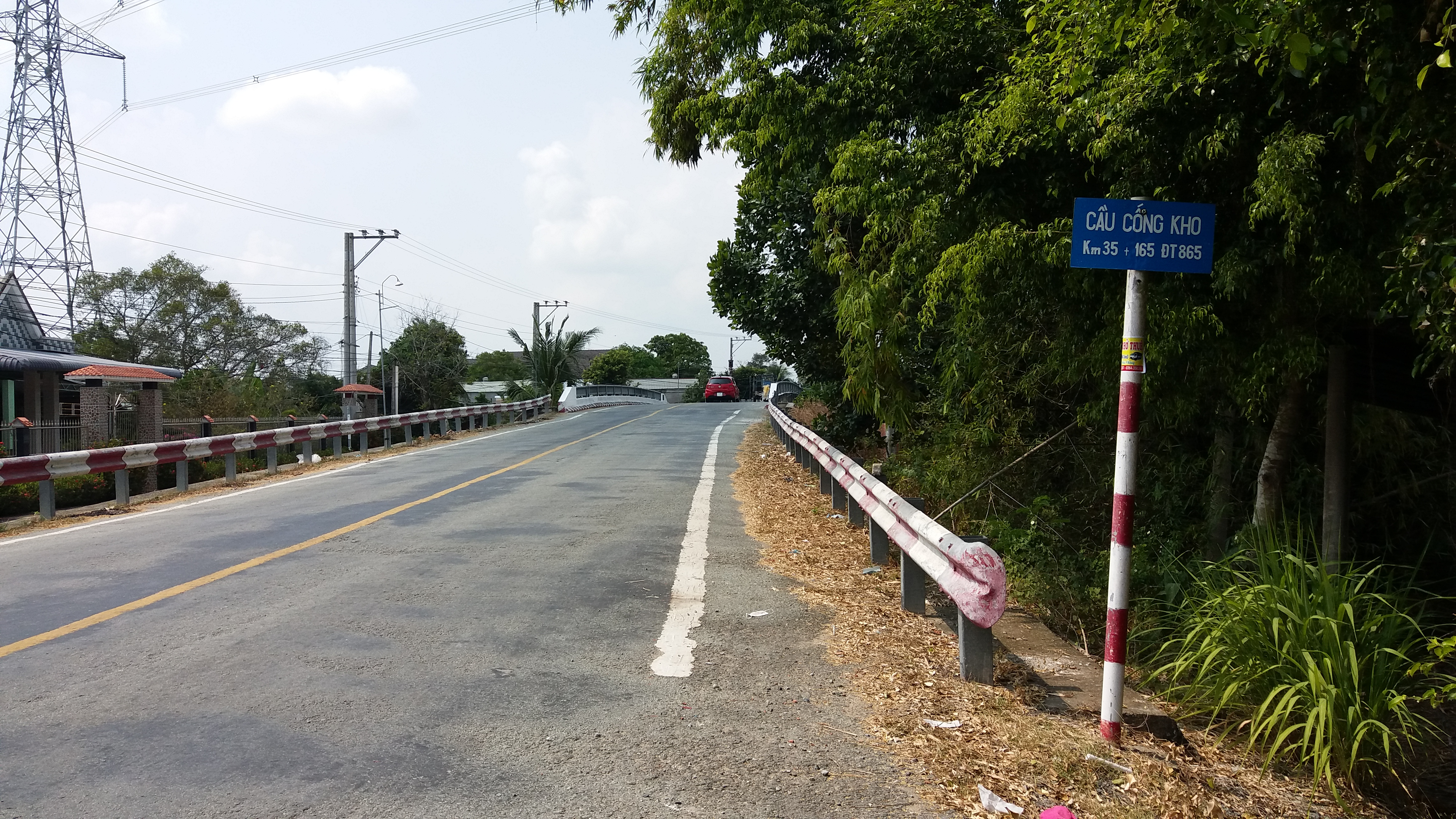
- Cống Kho bridge on provincial route 865
- Interactive map of Thạnh Phú
- Country: Vietnam
- Region: Mekong Delta
- Province: Đồng Tháp
- Established: June 16, 2025

Area
  - Total: 56.64 km^{2} (21.87 sq mi)

Population
  - Total: 28,431 people
  - Density: 502.0/km^{2} (1,300/sq mi)
- Time zone: UTC+07:00

Thạnh Phú is a commune in Đồng Tháp province, Vietnam. It is one of 102 communes and wards in the province.

== Geography ==
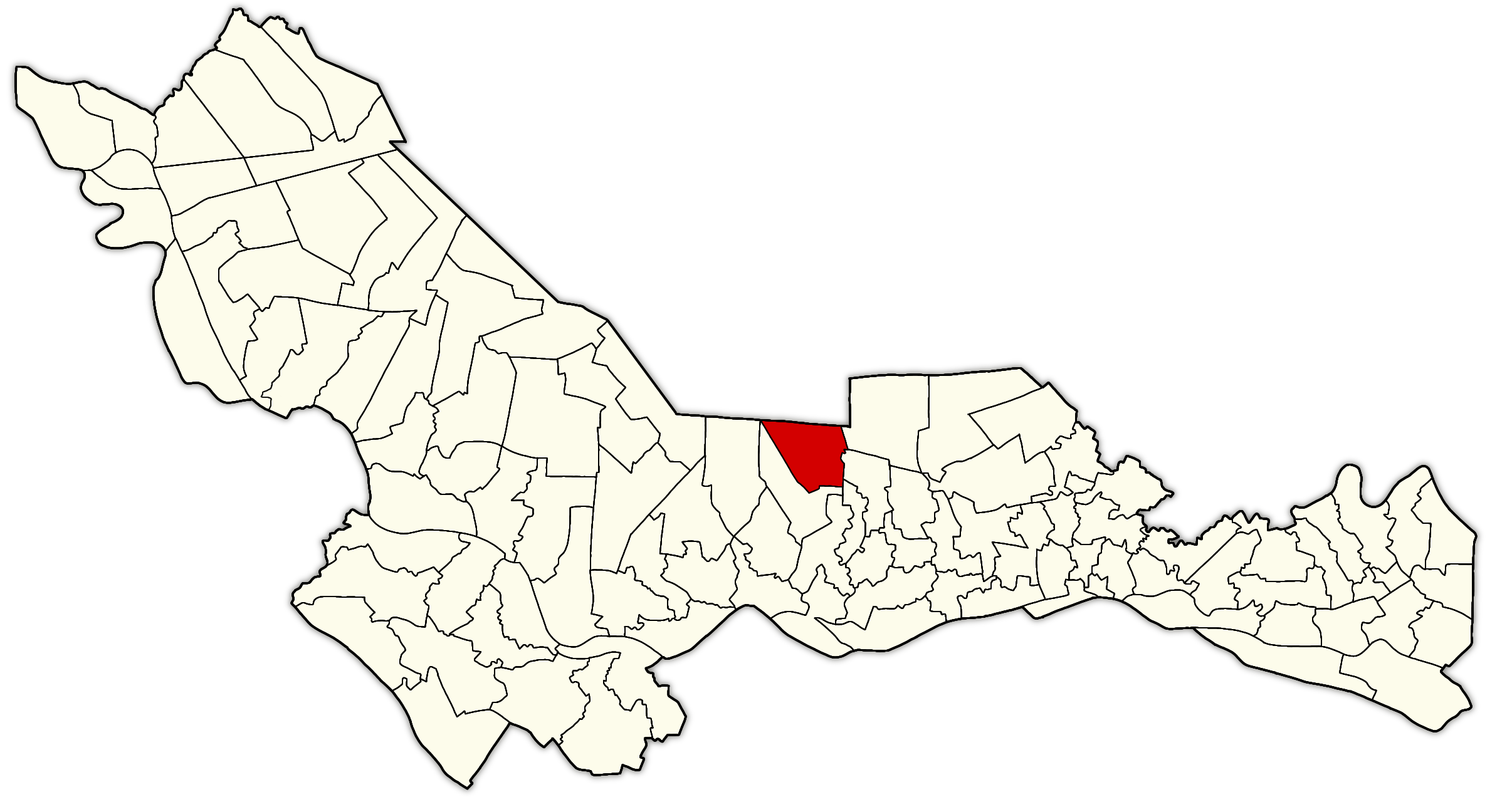
Location of Thạnh Phú commune on Đồng Tháp province map (highlight in red).

Thạnh Phú is a commune located in the eastern part of Đồng Tháp province, 45 km east of Cao Lãnh ward and 37 km northwest of Mỹ Tho ward. It borders Mỹ Thành commune to the west and south, Thanh Hòa, Mỹ Phước Tây wards and Tân Phước 2 commune to the east, Tây Ninh province to the north.

== Administrative divisions ==
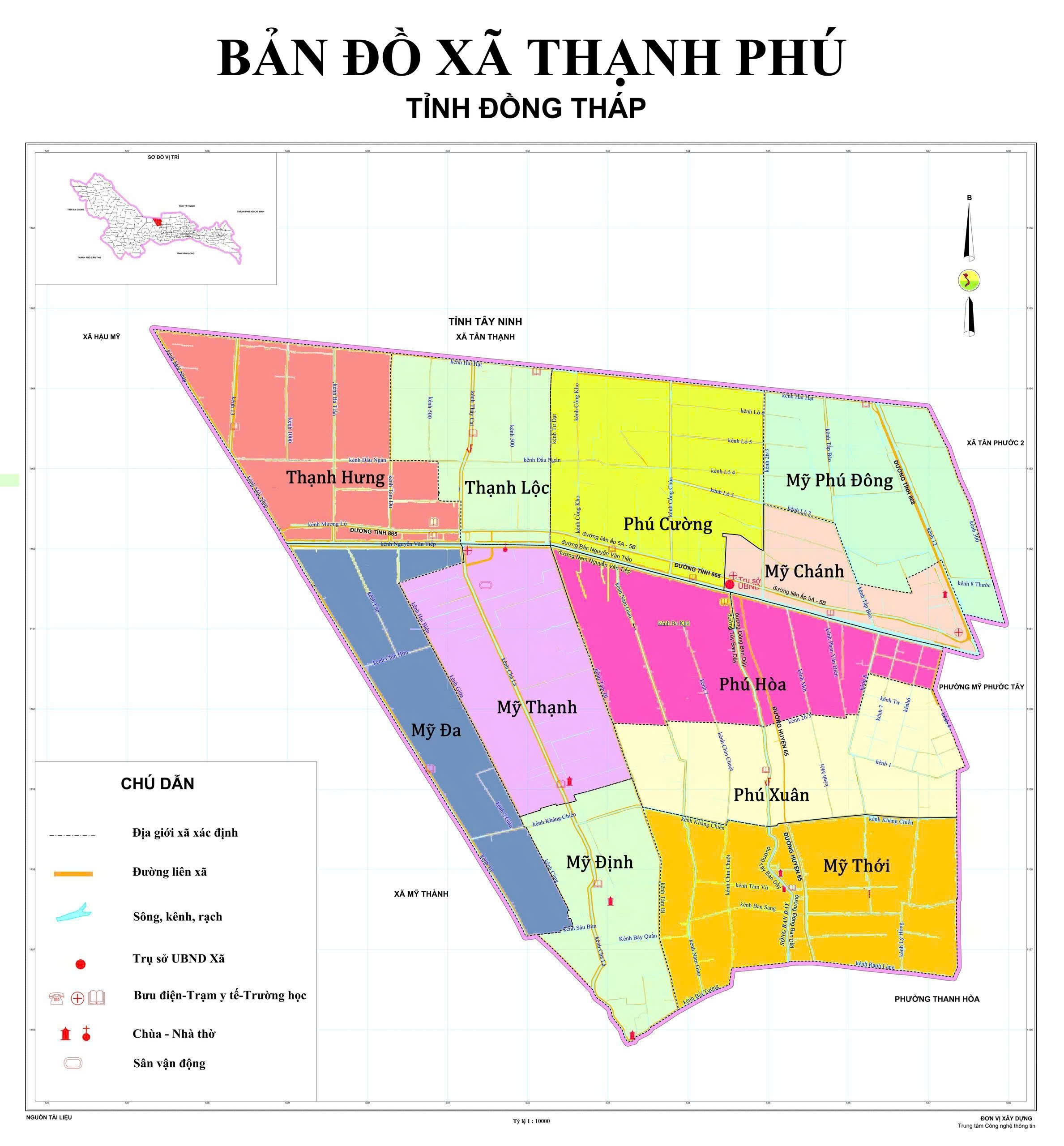
Administrative divisions of Thạnh Phú commune.

Thạnh Phú commune is divided into 11 hamlets: Mỹ Chánh, Mỹ Đa, Mỹ Định, Mỹ Phú Đông, Mỹ Thạnh, Mỹ Thới, Phú Cường, Phú Hòa, Phú Xuân, Thạnh Hưng and Thạnh Lộc.

== History ==
Prior to 2025, the area that is now Thạnh Phú commune was formerly Phú Cường and Thạnh Lộc communes in Cai Lậy district of Tiền Giang province.

On June 12, 2025, the National Assembly of Vietnam issued Resolution No. 202/2025/QH15 on the reorganization of the provincial-level administrative units. Đồng Tháp province was established by merging the entire area and population of Đồng Tháp and Tiền Giang province.

On June 16, 2025, the Standing Committee of the National Assembly of Vietnam issued Resolution No. 1663/NQ-UBTVQH15 on the reorganization of commune-level administrative units in Đồng Tháp province. Thạnh Phú commune was established by merging the entire area and population of Phú Cường and Thạnh Lộc communes (formerly part of Cai Lậy district).
