= Hiệp Đức, Đồng Tháp =

Commune in Đồng Tháp province, Vietnam

Hiệp Đức
- Commune
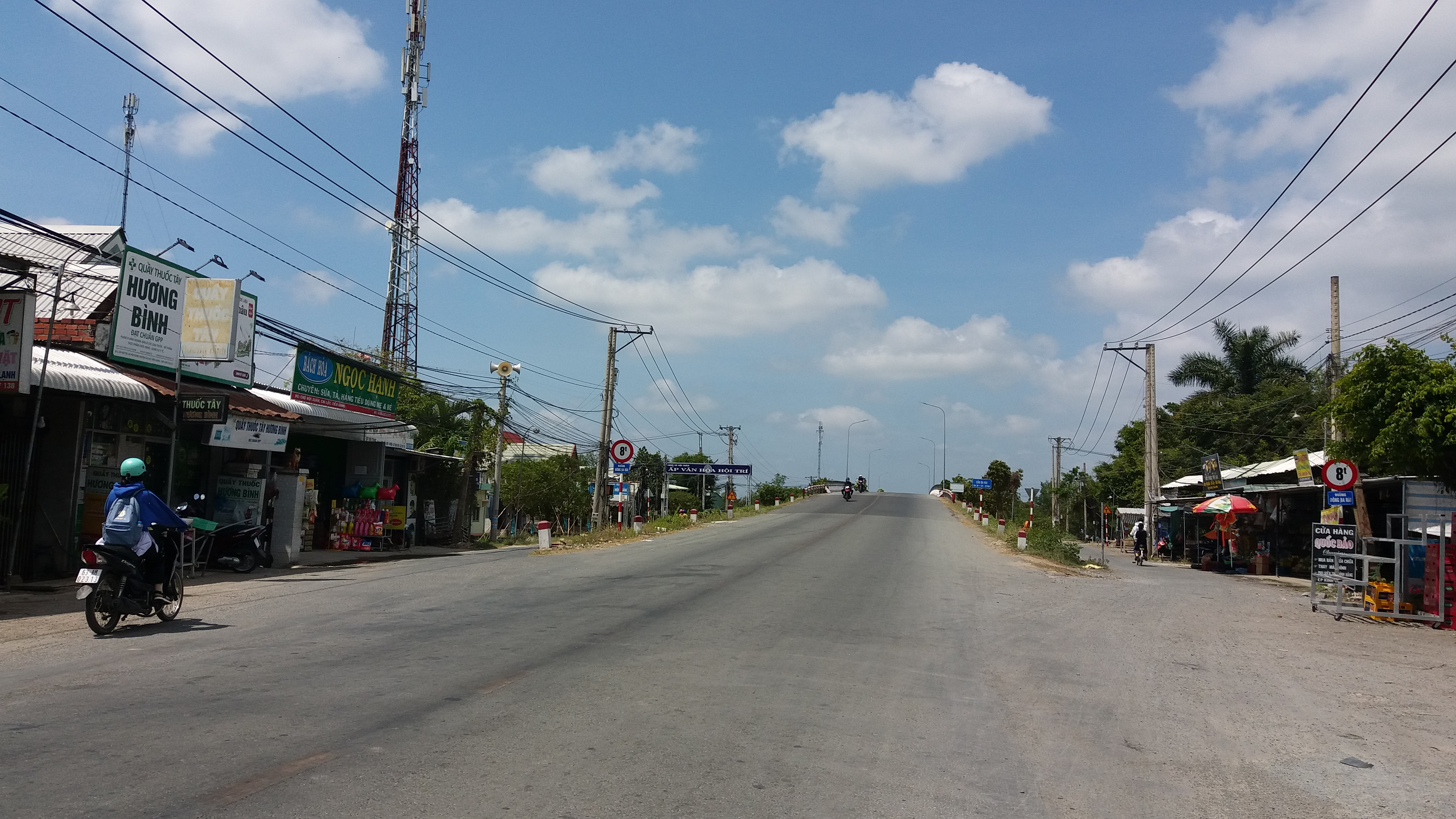
- Interactive map of Hiệp Đức
- Country: Vietnam
- Region: Mekong Delta
- Province: Đồng Tháp
- Established: June 16, 2025

Area
  - Total: 45.97 km^{2} (17.75 sq mi)

Population (2025)
  - Total: 35,734 people
  - Density: 777.3/km^{2} (2,013/sq mi)
- Time zone: UTC+07:00

Hiệp Đức is a commune in Đồng Tháp province, Vietnam. It is one of 102 communes and wards in the province.

== Geography ==
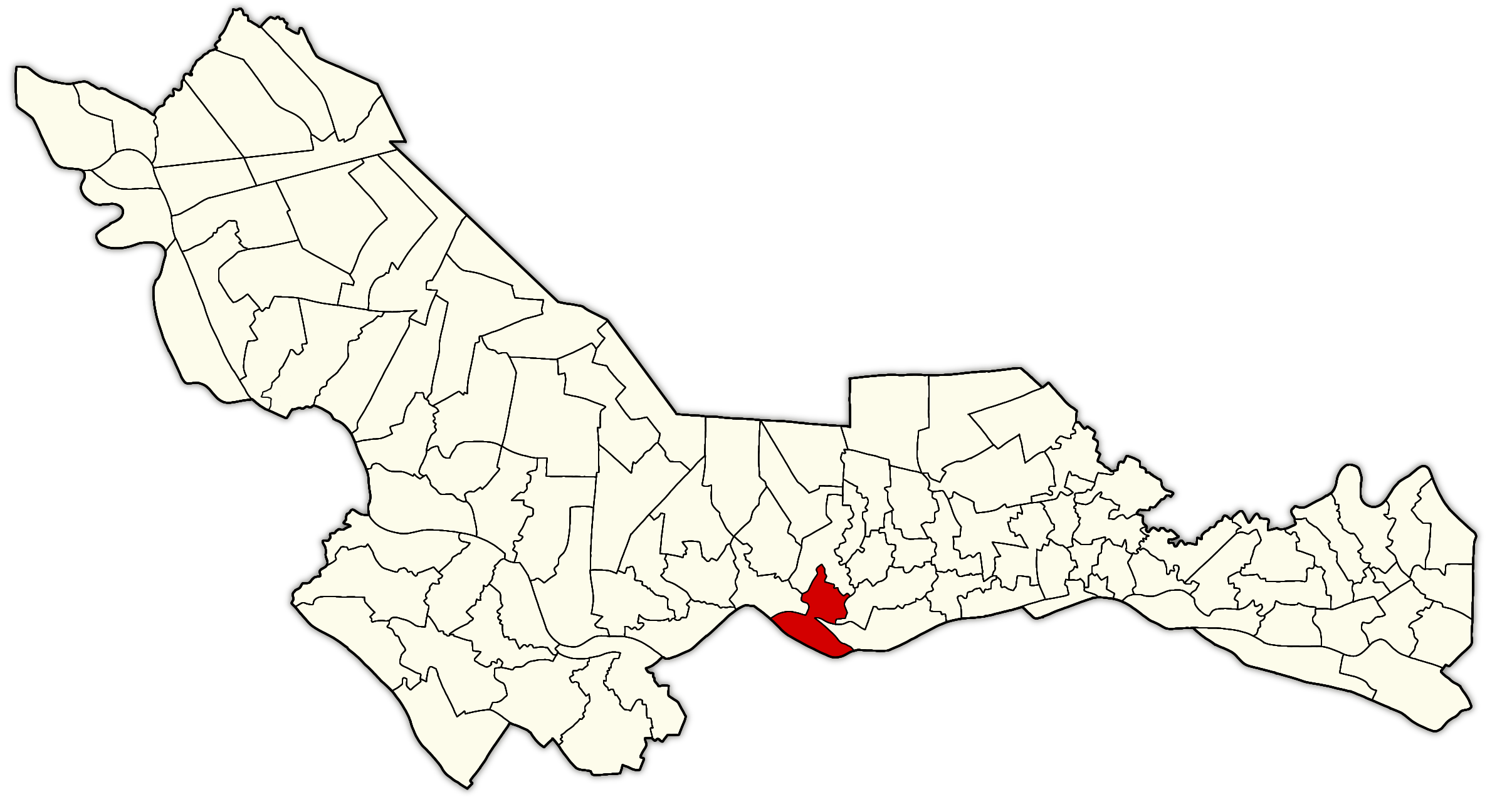
Location of Hiệp Đức commune on Đồng Tháp province map highlight in red).

Hiệp Đức is a commune located in the eastern part of Đồng Tháp province, 50 km east of Cao Lãnh ward, 35 km east of Sa Đéc ward, and 32 km west of Mỹ Tho ward. It borders Vĩnh Long province to the south, Cái Bè ward to the west, Bình Phú ward to the north, Long Tiên and Ngũ Hiệp communes to the east.

== Administrative divisions ==
Hiệp Đức commune is divided into 12 hamlets: Hiệp Nhơn, Hiệp Ninh, Hiệp Phú, Hội Sơn, Hội Trí, Hội Xuân, Tân An, Tân Luông, Tân Phong, Tân Thái, Tân Thiện, Xuân Sơn.

== History ==
On February 24, 1976, Tiền Giang province was established by merging the entire area and population of Mỹ Tho province, Gò Công province, and Mỹ Tho city.

At that time, the area of what is now Hiệp Đức commune consisted of Tân Phong, Hội Sơn, Xuân Sơn, and Hiệp Đức communes.

On April 12, 1979, Hội Xuân commune was established by merging Hội Sơn and Xuân Sơn communes.

On July 11, 1994, the Vietnamese Government issued Decree No. 68-CP establishing Tân Phước district of Tiền Giang province based on 6 communes: Hưng Thạnh, Tân Hòa Đông, Mỹ Phước, Phú Mỹ, Tân Lập, Tân Lập Thành of Châu Thành district and Tân Hòa Tây commune of Cai Lậy district.

On December 26, 2013, the Vietnamese Government issued Resolution No. 130/NQ-CP on the establishment of Cai Lậy district-level town from a part of Cai Lậy district. The communes of Hội Xuân, Tân Phong, and Hiệp Đức continue to belong to Cai Lậy district.

On June 12, 2025, the Standing Committee of the National Assembly of Vietnam issued Resolution No. 202/2025/QH15 on the reorganization of provincial-level administrative units. Đồng Tháp province was established by merging the entire area and population of Đồng Tháp province and Tiền Giang province.

On June 16, 2025, the Standing Committee of the National Assembly of Vietnam issued Resolution No. 1663/NQ-UBTVQH15 on the reorganization of provincial-level administrative units. Hiệp Đức commune was established by merging the entire area and population of Tân Phong, Hội Xuân and Hiệp Đức communes (formerly part of Cai Lậy district).

== Economy ==
Agriculture is the main economic sector of Hiệp Đức commune, primarily focusing on rice cultivation and fruit trees, especially is durian.
