= Cai Lậy (town) =

Coordinates: 10.417°N 106.083°E

- District-level town (Class-4)
- Cai Lậy district-level town Thị xã Cai Lậy
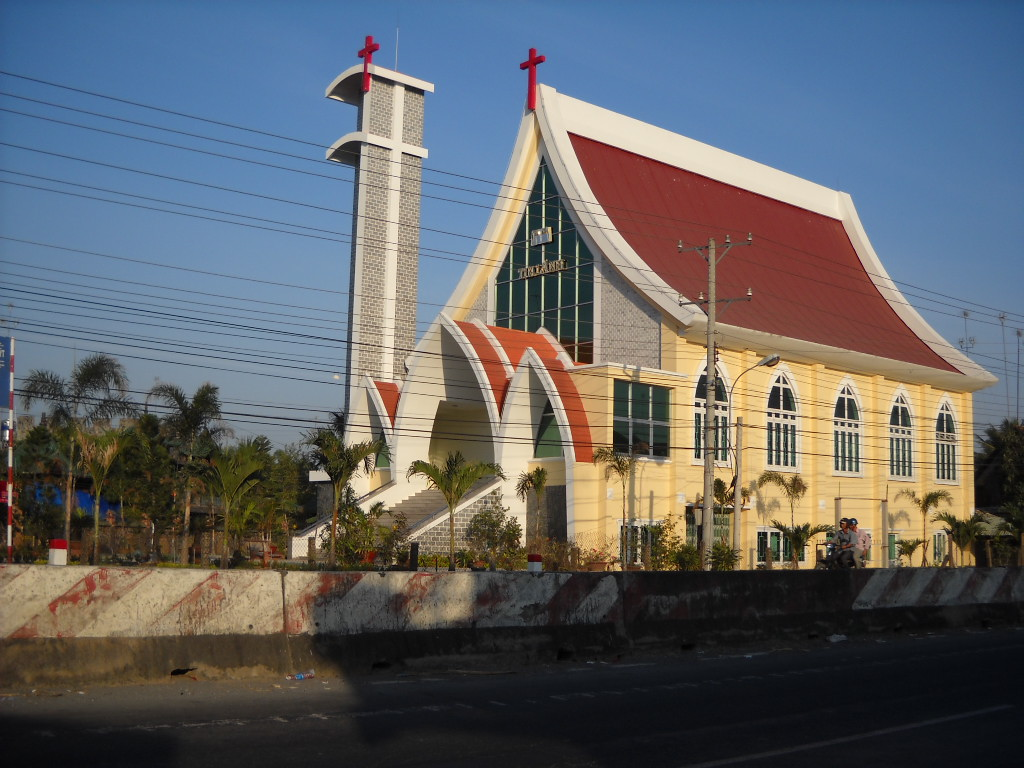
- Interactive map of Cai Lậy
- Country: Vietnam
- Region: Mekong Delta
- Province: Đồng Tháp province

Area
  - Total: 140 km^{2} (54 sq mi)

Population (2013)
  - Total: 123,775
- Time zone: UTC+7 (UTC + 7)

Cai Lậy is a former town of Tiền Giang province in the Mekong Delta region of Vietnam. The town was separated from Cai Lậy District in 2013. These are now Cai Lậy ward, Thanh Hòa ward, Mỹ Phước Tây ward, Nhị Quý ward and Tân Phú commune belonging to Đồng Tháp province.
