= Thống Nhất, Đồng Nai =

Thống Nhất Xã Thống Nhất
- Commune
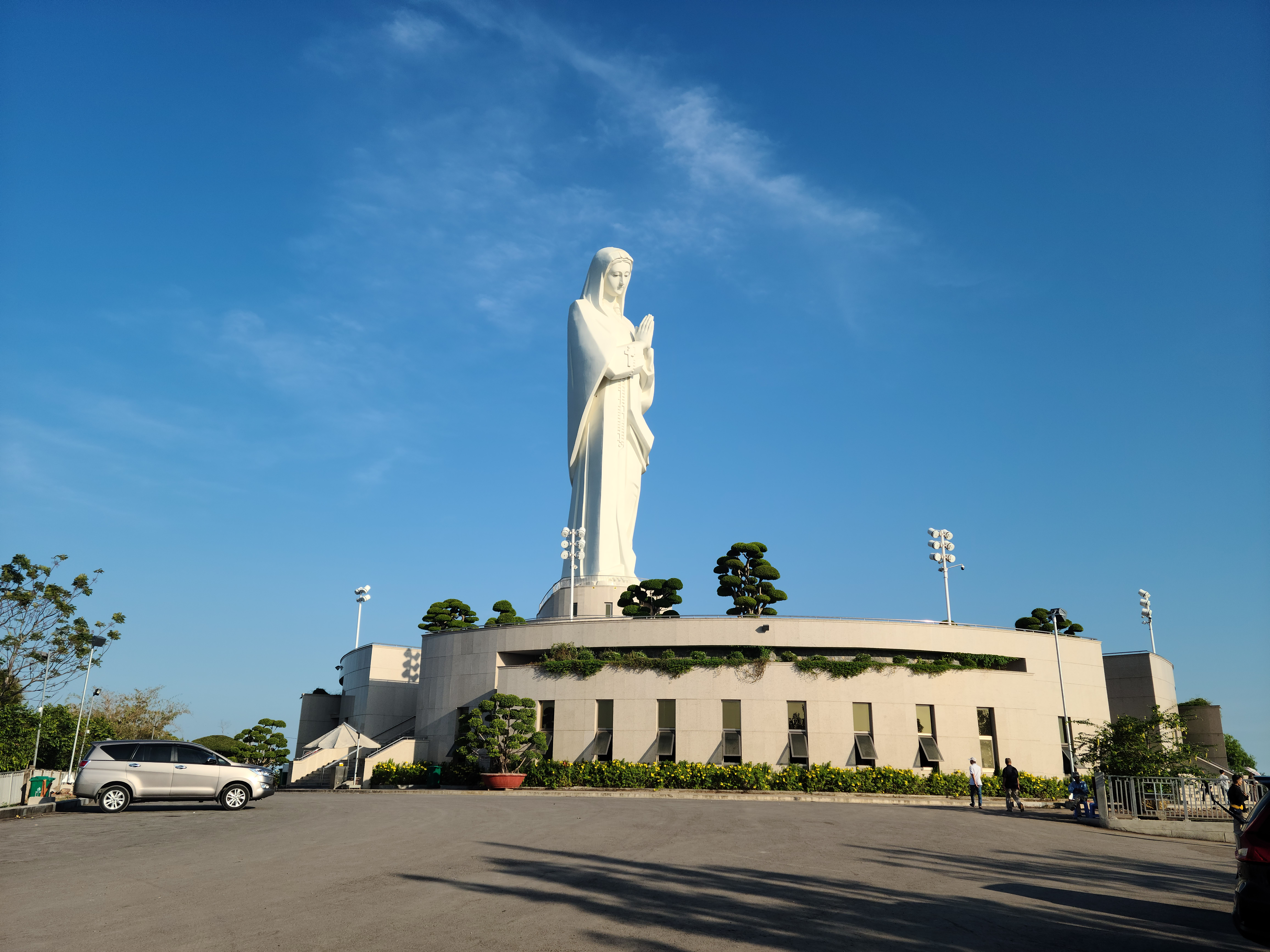
- Our Lady of Nui Cui pilgrimage site
- Interactive map of Thống Nhất
- Coordinates: 11°04′33″N 107°09′04″E
- Country: Vietnam
- Municipality: Đồng Nai
- Established: June 16, 2025

Area
  - Total: 46.36 sq mi (120.07 km^{2})

Population (2024)
  - Total: 71,665
  - Density: 1,545.9/sq mi (596.86/km^{2})
- Time zone: UTC+07:00 (Indochina Time)
- Administrative code: 26299

Thống Nhất (Vietnamese: Xã Thống Nhất) is a commune of Đồng Nai, Vietnam. It is one of the 95 new wards, communes and special zones of the province following the reorganization in 2025.

== History ==
On June 16, 2025, the National Assembly Standing Committee issued Resolution No. 1662/NQ-UBTVQH15 on the arrangement of commune-level administrative units of Đồng Nai province in 2025 (effective from June 16, 2025). Accordingly, the entire land area and population of Gia Tân 1, Gia Tân 2 communes of the former Thống Nhất district and Phú Cường, Phú Túc communes of the former Định Quán district will be integrated into a new commune named Thống Nhất (Clause 16, Article 1).
