= Nhị Quý =

- Ward
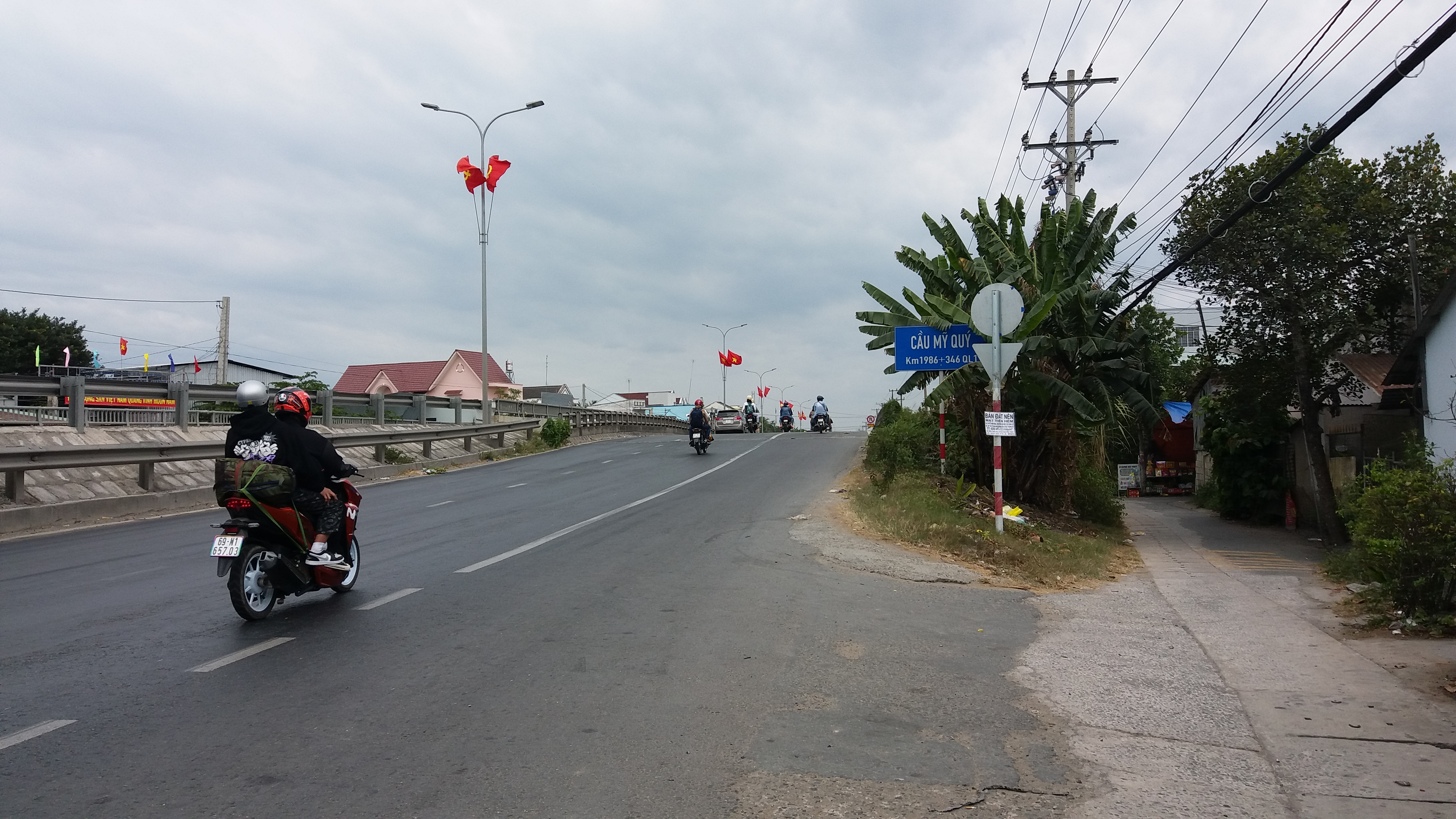
- Mỹ Quý bridge on National Highway 1
- Interactive map of Nhị Quý
- Country: Vietnam
- Region: Mekong Delta
- Province: Đồng Tháp
- Establish: 16 June, 2026

Area
  - Total: 21 km^{2} (8.1 sq mi)

Population (2025)
  - Total: 27,568 people
  - Density: 1,300/km^{2} (3,400/sq mi)

Nhị Quý is a commune in Đồng Tháp province, Vietnam. It is one of 102 communes and wards in the province following the reorganization in 2025.

== Geography ==
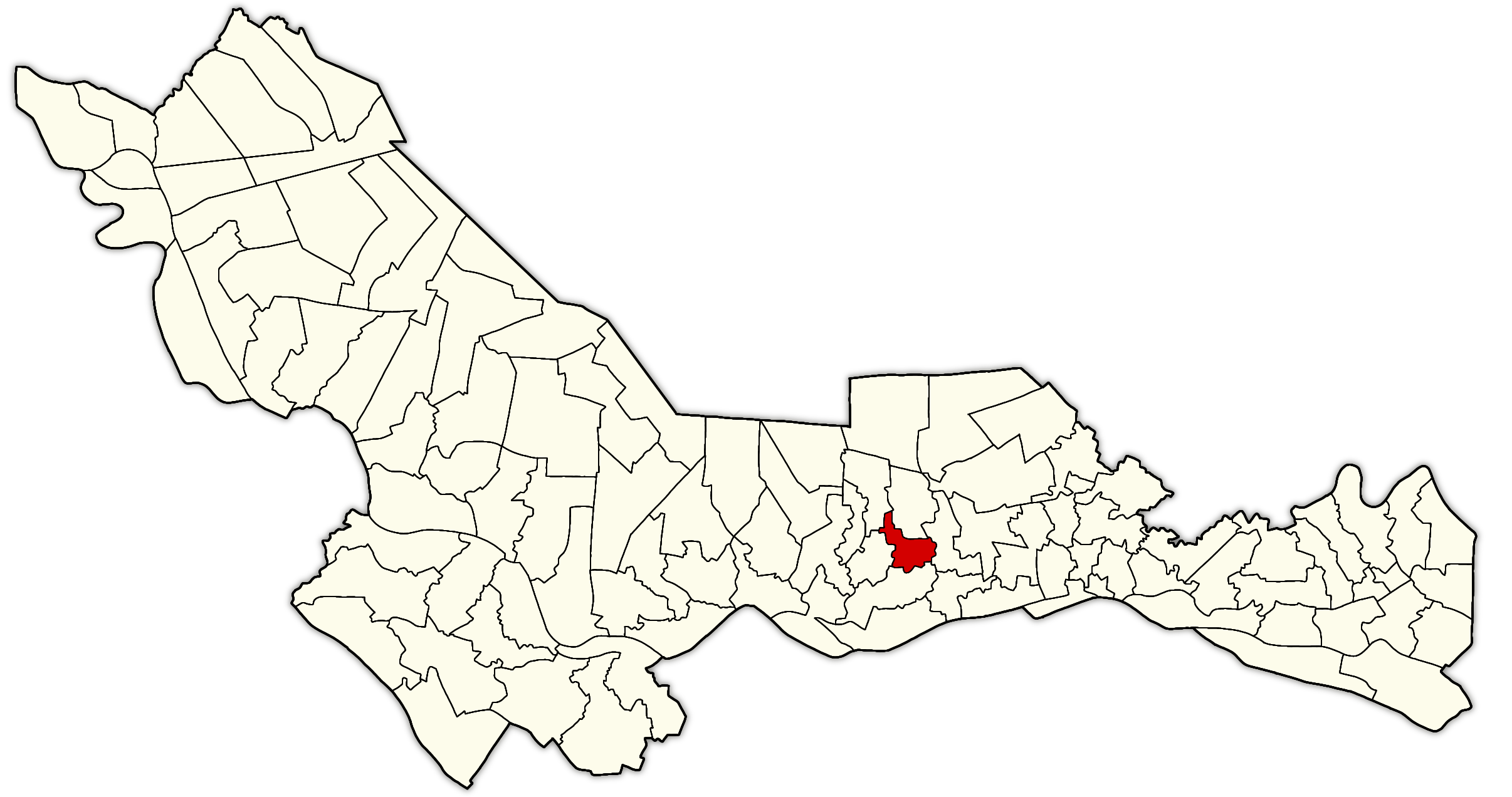
Location of Nhị Quý in Đồng Tháp province map (highlight in red).

Nhị Quý is a ward in Đồng Tháp province, located approximately 25km west of Mỹ Tho ward and 80km east of Cao Lãnh ward. The ward has the following geographical location:

- To the east, it borders Bình Trưng commune.
- To the west, it borders Cai Lậy ward.
- To the northwest, it borders Mỹ Phước Tây ward.
- To the south, it borders Long Tiên commune.
- To the north, it borders Tân Phú commune.

== History ==
Prior to 2025, Mỹ Quý ward was formerly Nhị Mỹ ward and Phú Quý and Nhị Quý communes belonging to Cai Lậy district-level town, Tiền Giang province.

On June 12, 2025, the National Assembly of Vietnam issued Resolution No. 202/2025/QH15 on the reorganization of provincial-level administrative units, accordingly:

- The Đồng Tháp province was established by merging the entire area and population of Đồng Tháp province and Tiền Giang province.

And on June 16 of the same year, the Standing Committee of the National Assembly of Vietnam issued Resolution No. 1663/NQ-UBTVQH15 on the reorganization of commune-level administrative units in Đồng Tháp province. Accordingly:

- The Nhị Quý ward was established by merging the entire area and population of Nhị Mỹ ward, Phú Quý commune, and Mỹ Quý commune in the old Cai Lậy district-level town, Tiền Giang province.
