= Thanh Hòa =

- Ward
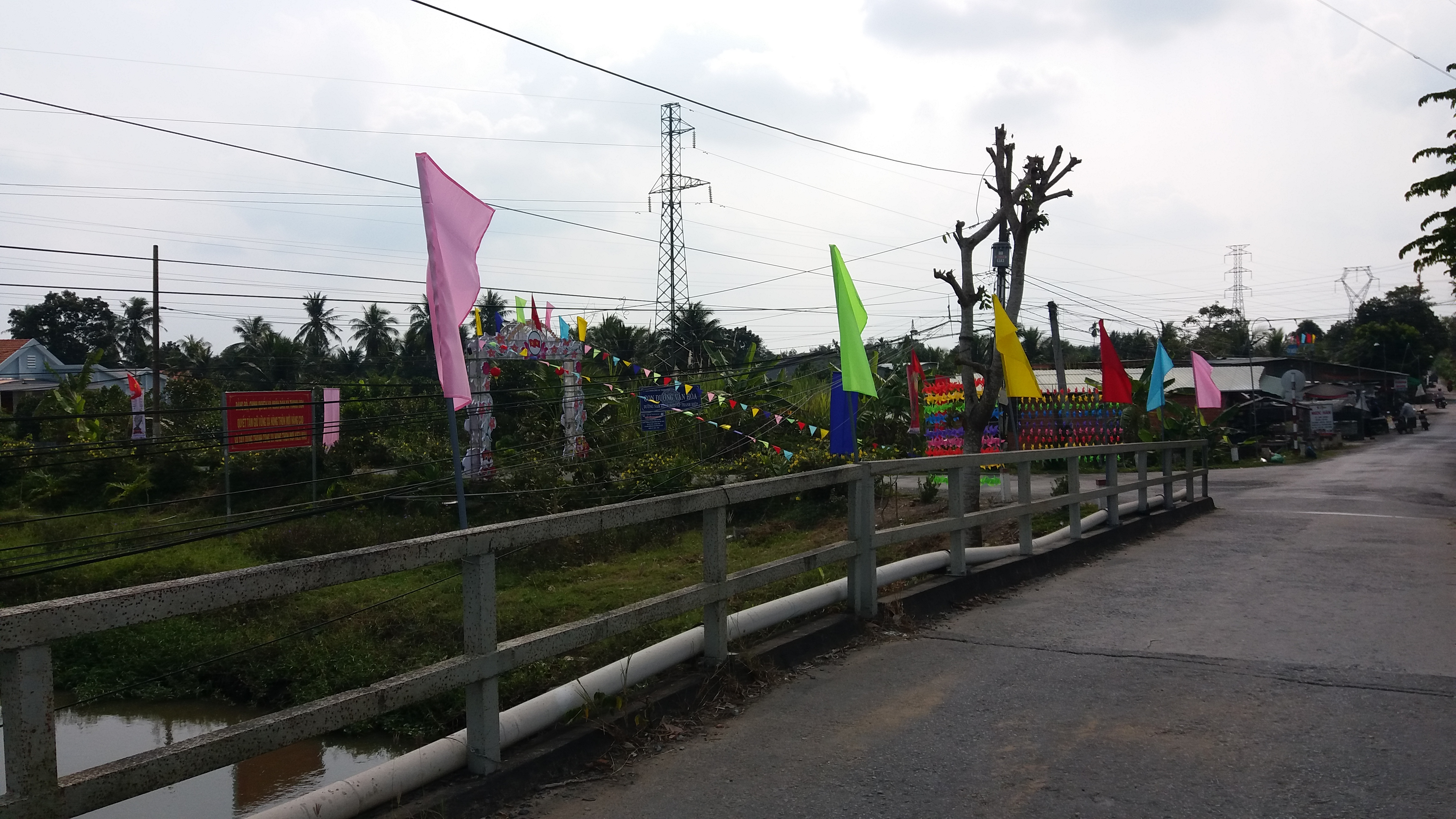
- Kênh Mới (New Canal) Bridge
- Interactive map of Thanh Hòa
- Country: Vietnam
- Province: Đồng Tháp
- Establish: June 16, 2025

Area
  - Total: 19.50 km^{2} (7.53 sq mi)

Population (2025)
  - Total: 20,903 people
  - Density: 1,072/km^{2} (2,776/sq mi)

Thanh Hòa is a ward in Đồng Tháp province, Vietnam. It is one of 102 communes and wards in the province following the 2025 reorganization.

== Geography ==
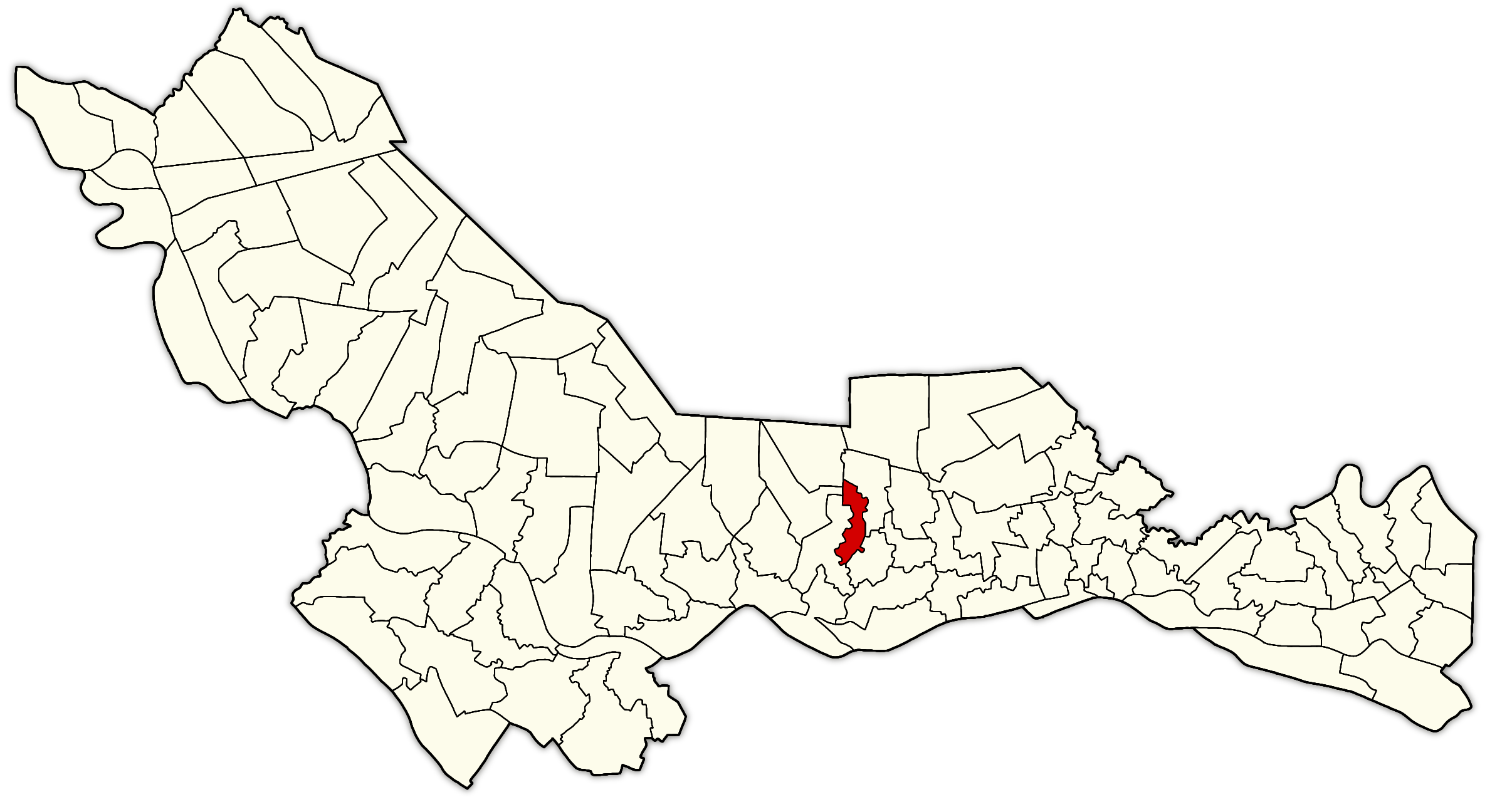
Location of Thanh Hòa ward on Đồng Tháp province map (highlight in red).

Thanh Hòa is a ward located in the eastern part of Đồng Tháp province. It is 70 km east of Cao Lãnh ward and 30 km west of Mỹ Tho ward. The ward has the following geographical location:

- To the west, it borders Bình Phú commune, Thạnh Phú commune, and Mỹ Thành commune.
- To the southeast, it borders Cai Lậy ward.
- To the northeast, it borders Mỹ Phước Tây ward.

== History ==
Prior to 2025, the current Thanh Hòa ward was formerly ward 2 and the communes of Tân Bình and Thanh Hòa in Cai Lậy district-level town, Tiền Giang province.

On June 12, 2025, the National Assembly of Vietnam issued Resolution No. 202/2025/QH15 on the reorganization of provincial-level administrative units. Accordingly:

- Đồng Tháp province was established by merging the entire area and population of Đồng Tháp province and Tiền Giang province.

On June 16, 2025, the Standing Committee of the National Assembly of Vietnam issued Resolution No. 1663/NQ-UBTVQH15 on the reorganization of commune-level administrative units in Đồng Tháp province. Accordingly:

- Thanh Hòa ward was established by merging the entire area and population of ward 2, Tân Bình commune, and Thanh Hòa commune (formerly part of Cai Lậy district-level town).
