= Định Quán =

Định Quán Xã Định Quán
- Commune
- Định Quán commune
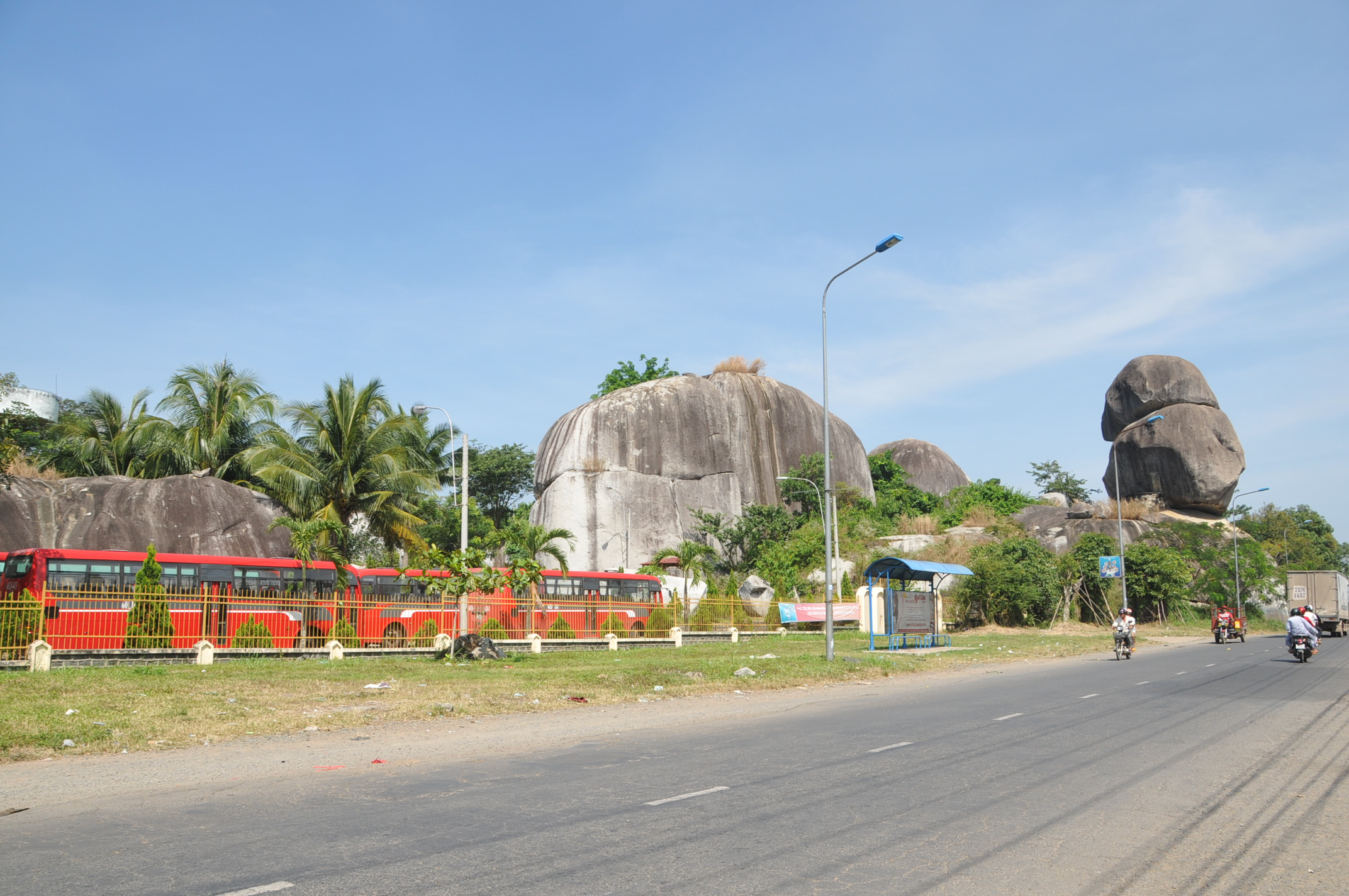

- Location within Vietnam
- Coordinates: 11°11′50″N 107°21′07″E
- Country: Vietnam
- Region: Southeast
- Municipality: Đồng Nai
- Time zone: UTC+7 (UTC + 7)

Định Quán is a commune (xã) of Đồng Nai, Vietnam.
