= Tân Phú, Đồng Tháp =

Tân Phú
- Commune
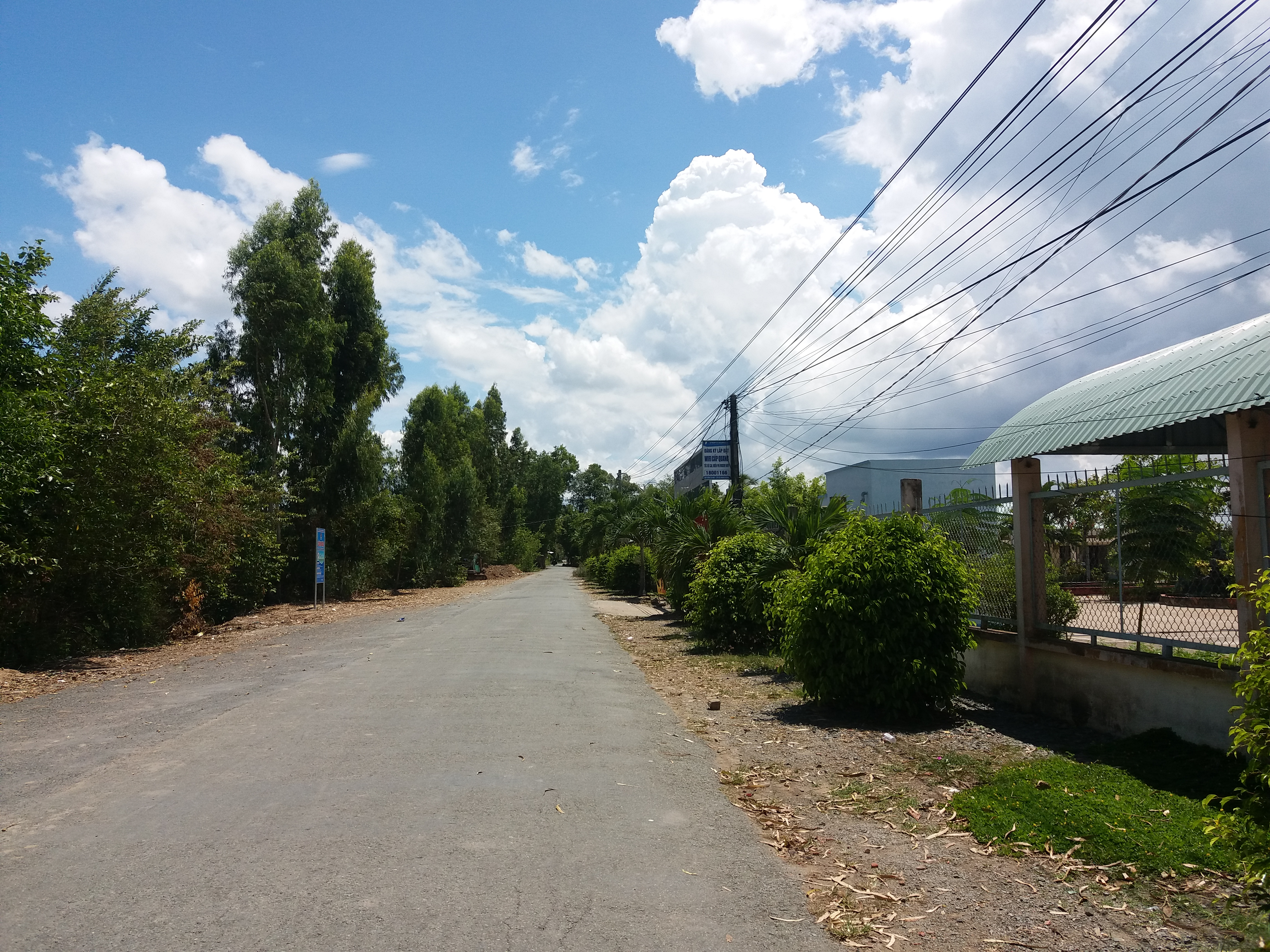
- District road 53 in Tân Phú commune
- Interactive map of Tân Phú
- Country: Vietnam
- Province: Đồng Tháp
- Establish: June 16, 2025

Area
  - Total: 38.6 km^{2} (14.9 sq mi)

Population (2025)
  - Total: 31,360 people
  - Density: 812/km^{2} (2,100/sq mi)
- Time zone: UTC+07:00

Tân Phú is a commune in Đồng Tháp province, Vietnam. It is one of 102 communes and wards in the province following the 2025 administrative reform.

== Geography ==
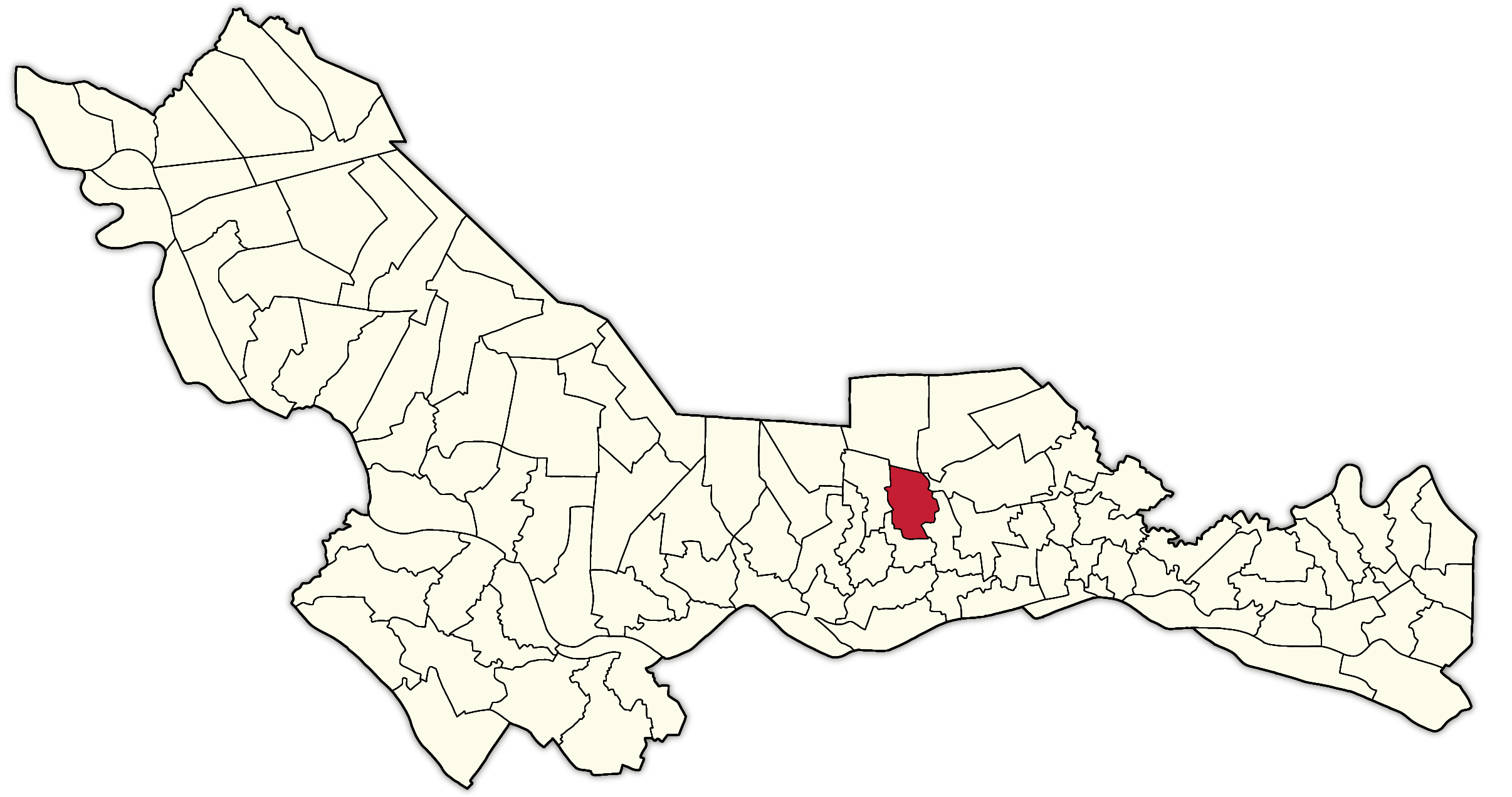
Location of Tân Phú commune on Đồng Tháp province map (highlight in red).

Tân Phú is a commune located in the eastern part of Đồng Tháp province. It is 80 km east of Cao Lãnh ward and 30 km northwest of Mỹ Tho ward. The commune has the following geographical location:

- To the north, it borders Tân Phước 2 commune.
- To the east, it borders Tân Phước 3 commune and Bình Trưng commune.
- To the south and southwest, it borders Nhị Quý ward.
- To the west, it borders Mỹ Phước Tây ward.

== History ==
Prior to 2025, Tân Phú commune was formerly Mỹ Hạnh Đông, Tân Phú, and Tân Hội communes belonging to Cai Lậy district-level town, Tiền Giang province.

On June 12, 2025, the National Assembly of Vietnam issued Resolution No. 202/2025/QH15 on the reorganization of provincial-level administrative units. Accordingly:

- Đồng Tháp province was established by merging the entire area and population of Đồng Tháp province and Tiền Giang province.

On June 16, 2025, the Standing Committee of the National Assembly of Vietnam issued Resolution No. 1663/NQ-UBTVQH15 on the reorganization of commune-level administrative units in Đồng Tháp province. Accordingly:

- Tân Phú commune was established by merging the entire area and population of Mỹ Hạnh Đông commune, Tân Phú commune, and Tân Hội commune (formerly part of Cai Lậy district-level town).
