= Bình Phú, Đồng Tháp =

Bình Phú
- Ward
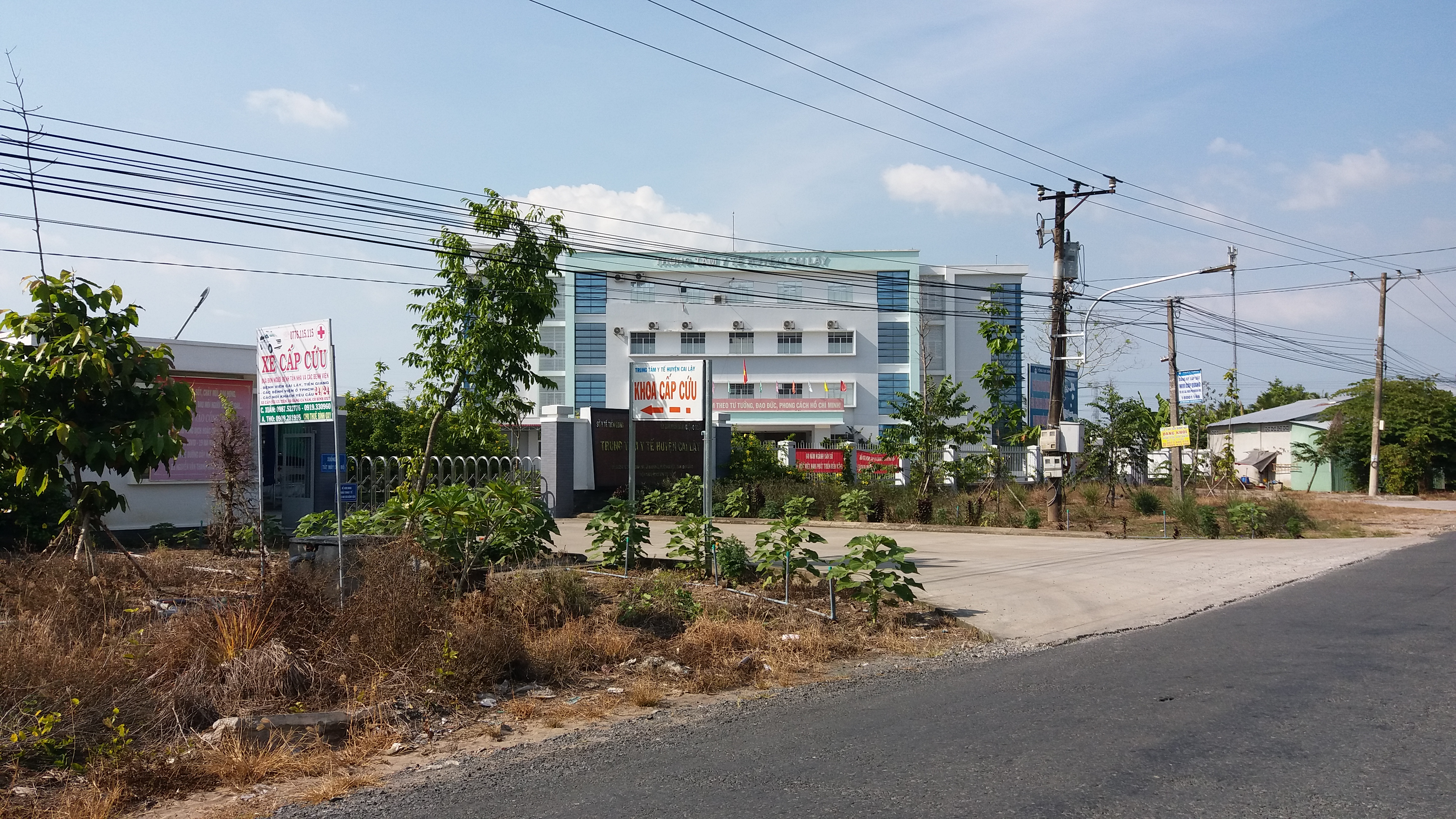
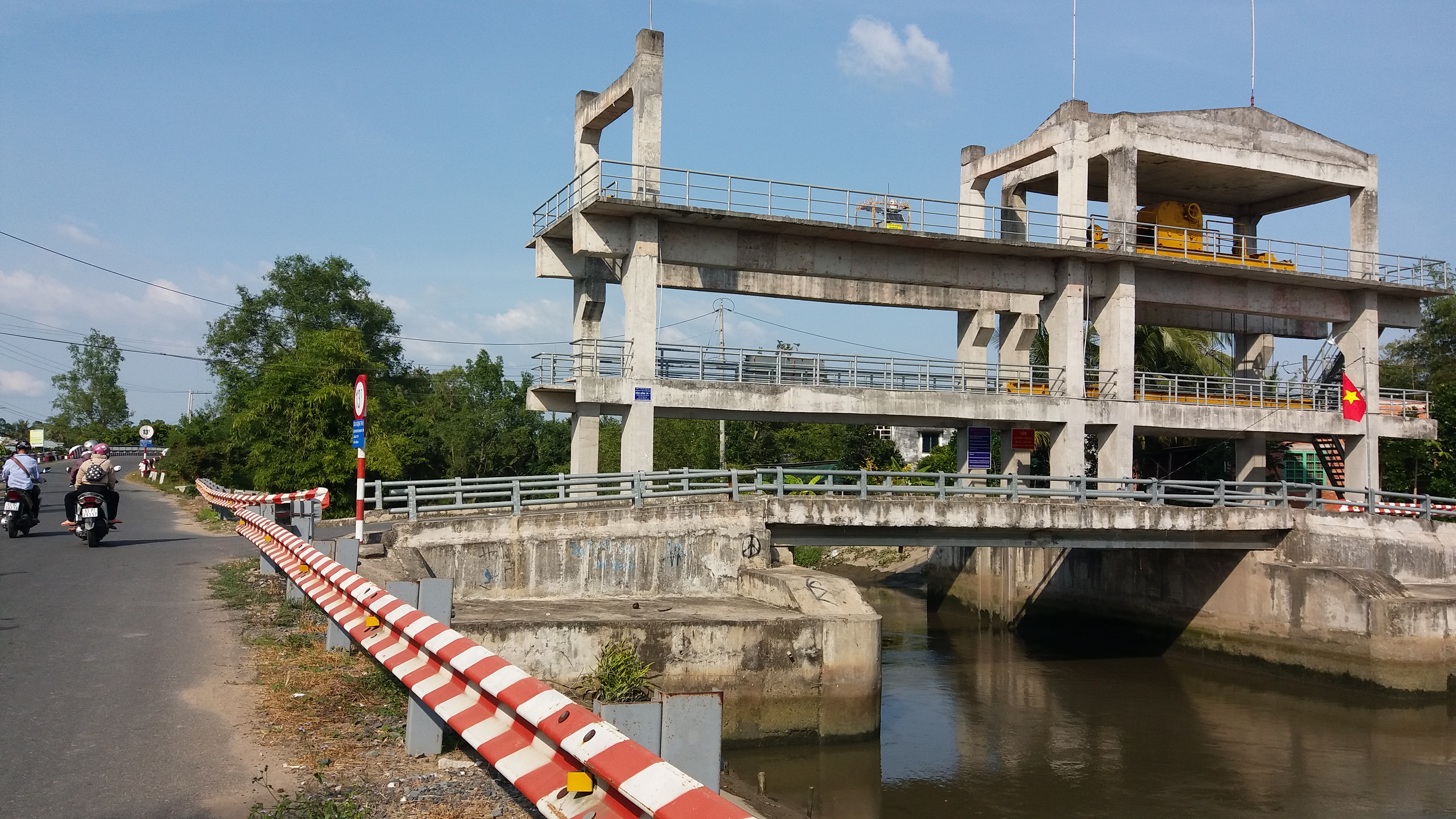
- From top to bottom: Cai Lậy Medical Center, Giồng Tre saltwater intrusion barrier
- Interactive map of Bình Phú
- Country: Vietnam
- Province: Đồng Tháp
- Establish: June 16, 2025
- Become a ward: May 11, 2026

Area
  - Total: 47.3 km^{2} (18.3 sq mi)

Population (2025)
  - Total: 51,081 people
  - Density: 1,080/km^{2} (2,800/sq mi)
- Time zone: UTC+07:00

Bình Phú is a ward in Đồng Tháp province. It is one of the 102 wards and communes in the province.

== Geography ==
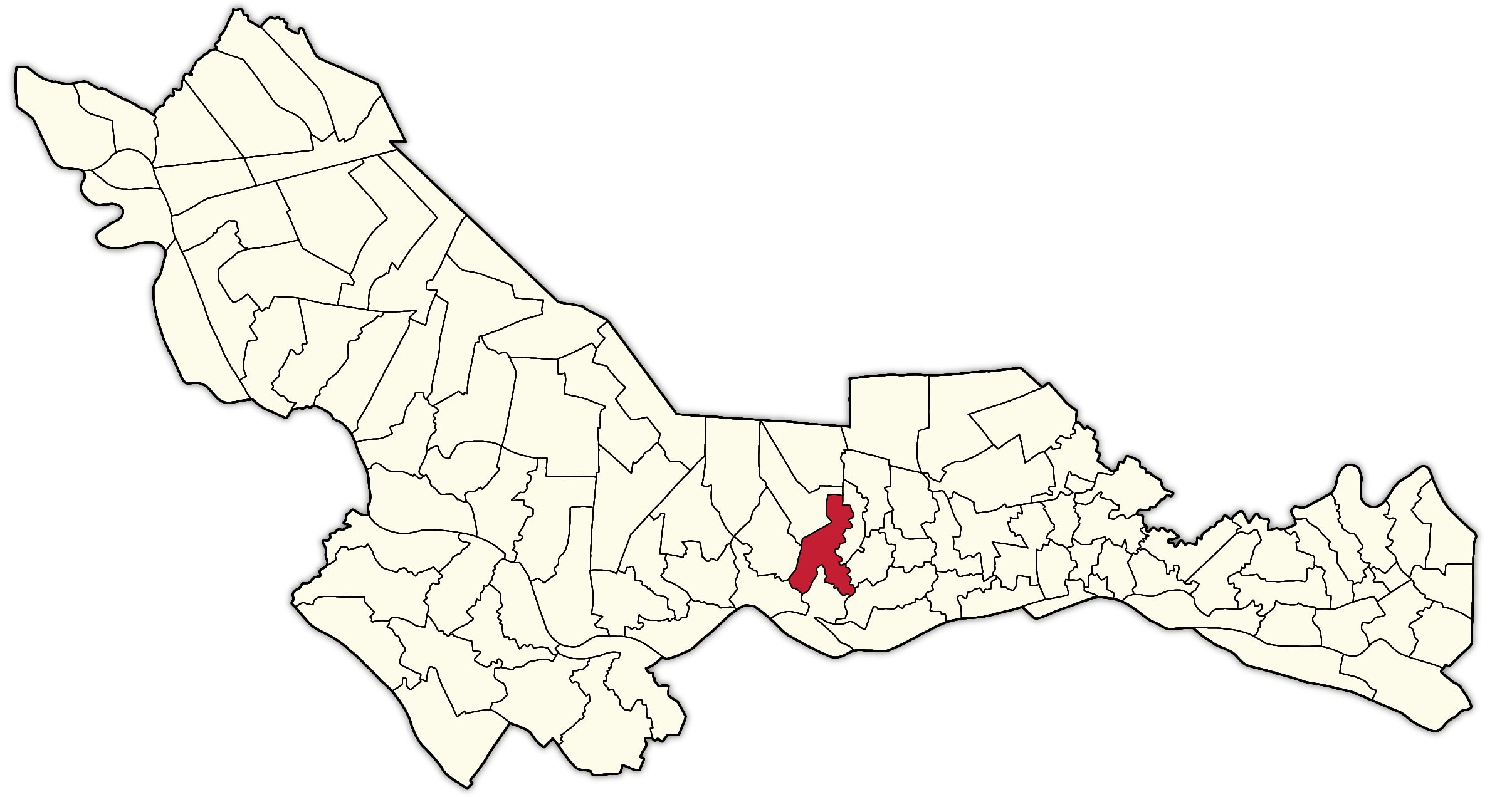
Location of Bình Phú ward on Đồng Tháp province map (highlight in red).

Bình Phú is a ward located in the eastern part of Đồng Tháp province, 65km east of Cao Lãnh ward and 40km west of Mỹ Tho ward. The commune has the following geographical location:

- To the east, it borders Cai Lậy ward and Thanh Hòa ward.
- To the north, it borders Mỹ Thành commune.
- To the west, it borders Hội Cư commune.
- To the south, it borders Cái Bè commune, Hiệp Đức commune, and Long Tiên commune.

== History ==
Prior to 2025, the current Bình Phú ward was formerly Bình Phú commune-level town, Phú An commune, and Cẩm Sơn commune in Cai Lậy district, Tiền Giang province.

On June 12, 2025, the National Assembly of Vietnam issued Resolution No. 202/2025/QH15 on the reorganization of provincial-level administrative units. Accordingly:

- Đồng Tháp province was established by merging the entire area and population of Đồng Tháp province and Tiền Giang province.

On June 16, 2025, the Standing Committee of the National Assembly of Vietnam issued Resolution No. 1663/NQ-UBTVQH15 on the reorganization of commune-level administrative units in Đồng Tháp province. Accordingly:

- Bình Phú commune was established by merging the entire area and population of Bình Phú commune-level town, Phú An commune, and Cẩm Sơn commune (formerly part of Cai Lậy district).

On May 11, 2026, the People's Council of Đồng Tháp province approved the plan to establish 11 new wards in the province. Accordingly:

- The Bình Phú ward was established based on the entire area and population of Bình Phú commune.
