= Cai Lậy, Đồng Tháp =

Cai Lậy
- Ward
- Interactive map of Cai Lậy
- Country: Vietnam
- Region: Mekong Delta
- Province: Đồng Tháp
- Establish: June 16, 2025

Area
  - Total: 26 km^{2} (10 sq mi)

Population (2024)
  - Total: 34,117 people
  - Density: 1,300/km^{2} (3,400/sq mi)
- Area code: 28439

Cai Lậy is a ward in Đồng Tháp province, Vietnam. This is one of 102 communes and wards in the province.

== Geography ==
Cai Lậy is a ward located in the eastern part of Đồng Tháp province, 30 km west of Mỹ Tho ward and about 70 km east of Cao Lãnh ward. The ward has the following geographical location:

- To the east, it borders Nhị Quý ward
- To the northwest, it borders Thanh Hòa.
- To the south, it borders the Long Tiên commune.
- To the north, it borders Mỹ Phước Tây ward.

== History ==
Prior to 2025, the ward was part of Cai Lậy district-level town, Tiền Giang province.

On June 12, 2025, the National Assembly of Vietnam issued Resolution No. 202/2025/QH15 on the rearrangement of provincial-level administrative units. Accordingly, the entire natural area and population size of Tiền Giang province and Đồng Tháp province will be combined into a new province called Đồng Tháp province.

On June 16, 2025, the Standing Committee of the 15th National Assembly issued Resolution No. 1663/NQ-UBTVQH15 on the rearrangement of commune-level administrative units in Đồng Tháp province in 2025. Accordingly:

- Cai Lậy ward was established by merging the entire area and population of Ward 4, Ward 5, and Long Khánh commune in Cai Lậy district-level town.
