= Định Quán district =

Coordinates: 11.2038°N 107.3587°E

Định Quán district Huyện Định Quán
- District
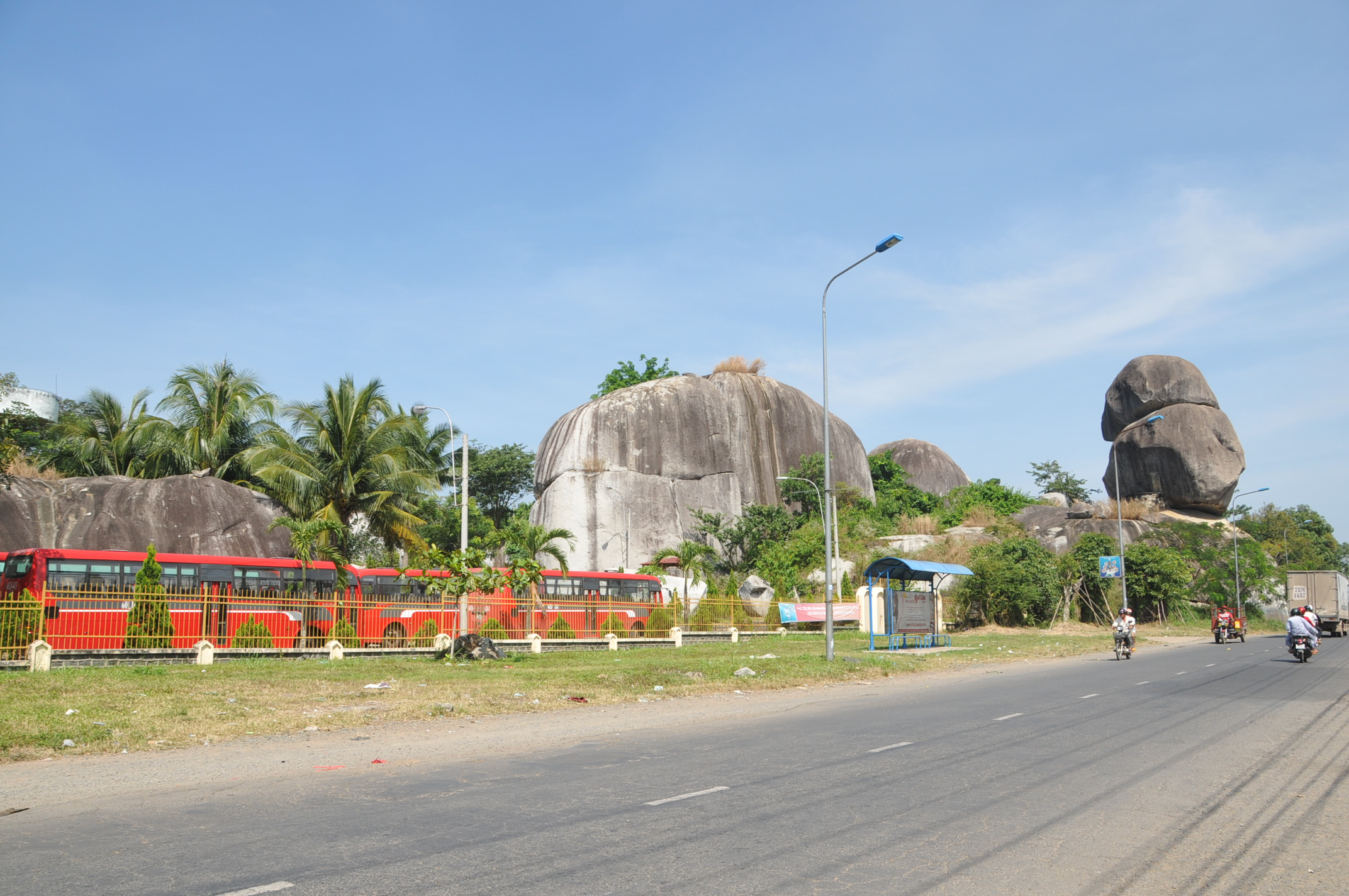
- Đá ba Chồng in Dinh Quan

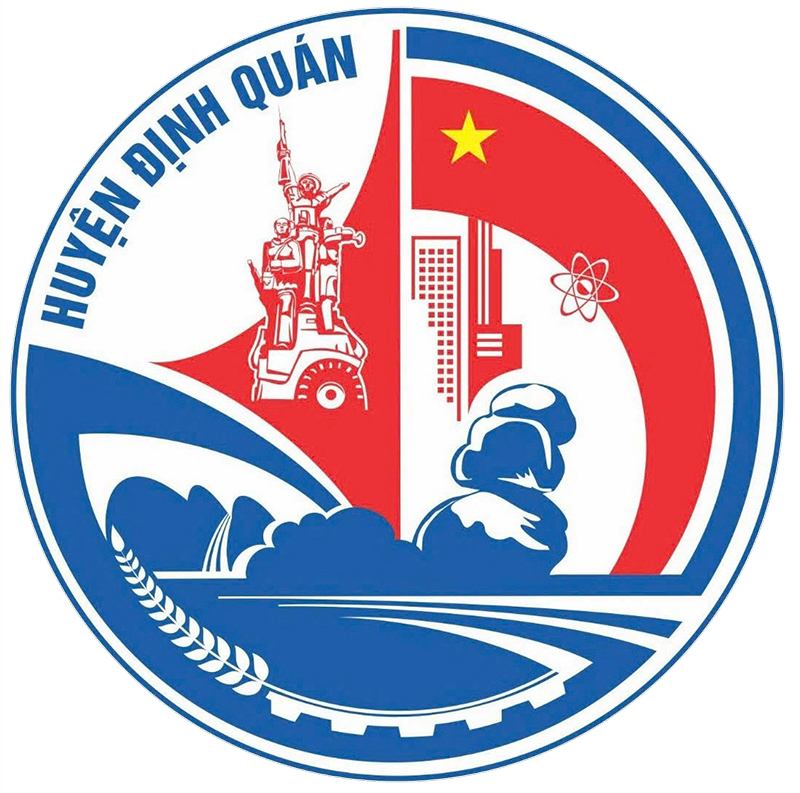
- Seal
- Interactive map of Định Quán district
- Country: Vietnam
- Region: Southeast
- Province: Đồng Nai
- Capital: Định Quán

Area
  - Total: 373 sq mi (967 km^{2})

Population (2019 census)
  - Total: 187,306
  - Density: 502/sq mi (194/km^{2})
- Time zone: UTC+7 (Indochina Time)

Định Quán is a former rural district of Đồng Nai province in the Southeast region of Vietnam. As of 2019 the district had a population of 187,306. The district covers an area of 967 km^{2} (373 sq mi). The district capital lies at Định Quán.

== Administrative subdivisions ==
This district is mostly rural, with the following xã:

- Định Quán town (thị trấn)
- Xã Thanh Sơn
- Xã Phú Tân
- Xã Phú Vinh
- Xã Ngọc Định
- Xã La Ngà
- Xã Phú Lợi
- Xã Phú Hoà
- Xã Gia Canh
- Xã Phú Ngọc
- Xã Túc Trưng
- Xã Phú Cường
- Xã Phú Túc
- Xã Suối Nho.
