= Mỹ Phước Tây =

- Ward
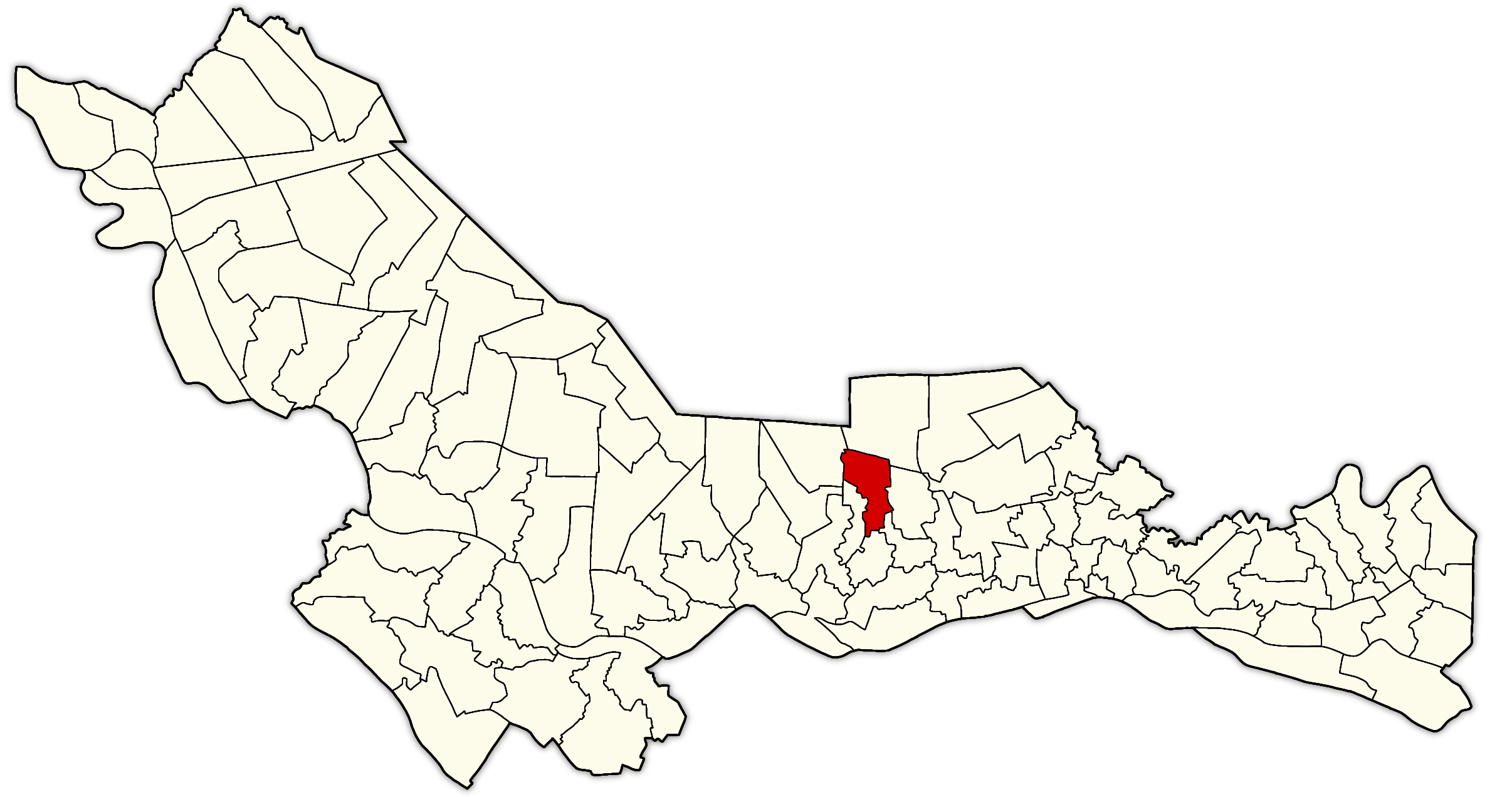
- Location of Mỹ Phước Tây ward on the map of Đồng Tháp province (highlight in red).
- Interactive map of Mỹ Phước Tây
- Coordinates: 10°28′37″N 106°07′00″E
- Country: Vietnam
- Province: Đồng Tháp
- Established: June 16, 2025

Area
  - Total: 13.92 sq mi (36.05 km^{2})

Population (2024)
  - Total: 40,730 people
  - Density: 2,926/sq mi (1,130/km^{2})
- Time zone: UTC+07:00 (Indochina Time)
- Administrative code: 28435

Mỹ Phước Tây (Vietnamese: Mỹ Phước Tây) is a ward of Đồng Tháp province, Vietnam. It is one of the 102 new wards, communes of the province following the reorganization in 2025.

== History ==
On June 16, 2025, the National Assembly Standing Committee issued Resolution No. 1663/NQ-UBTVQH15 on the arrangement of commune-level administrative units of Đồng Tháp province in 2025 (effective from June 16, 2025). Accordingly, the entire land area and population of Ward 1, Ward 3 and Mỹ Hạnh Trung, Mỹ Phước Tây communes of the former Cai Lậy town will be integrated into a new ward named Mỹ Phước Tây (Clause 99, Article 1).
