= Cai Lậy district =

Coordinates: 10.417°N 106.083°E

Cai Lậy district Huyện Cai Lậy
- District
- Interactive map of Cai Lậy district
- Country: Vietnam
- Region: Mekong Delta
- Province: Đồng Tháp province
- Capital: Bình Phú

Area
  - Total: 296 km^{2} (114 sq mi)

Population (2019)
  - Total: 193,328
- Time zone: UTC+7 (UTC + 7)
- Area code: 870

Cai Lậy is a former district of Tiền Giang province in the Mekong Delta region of Vietnam. As of 2019 the district had a population of 193,328. The district covers an area of 296 km^{2}. The district capital lies at Bình Phú commune-level town. The town of Cai Lậy was separated from the district in 2013.

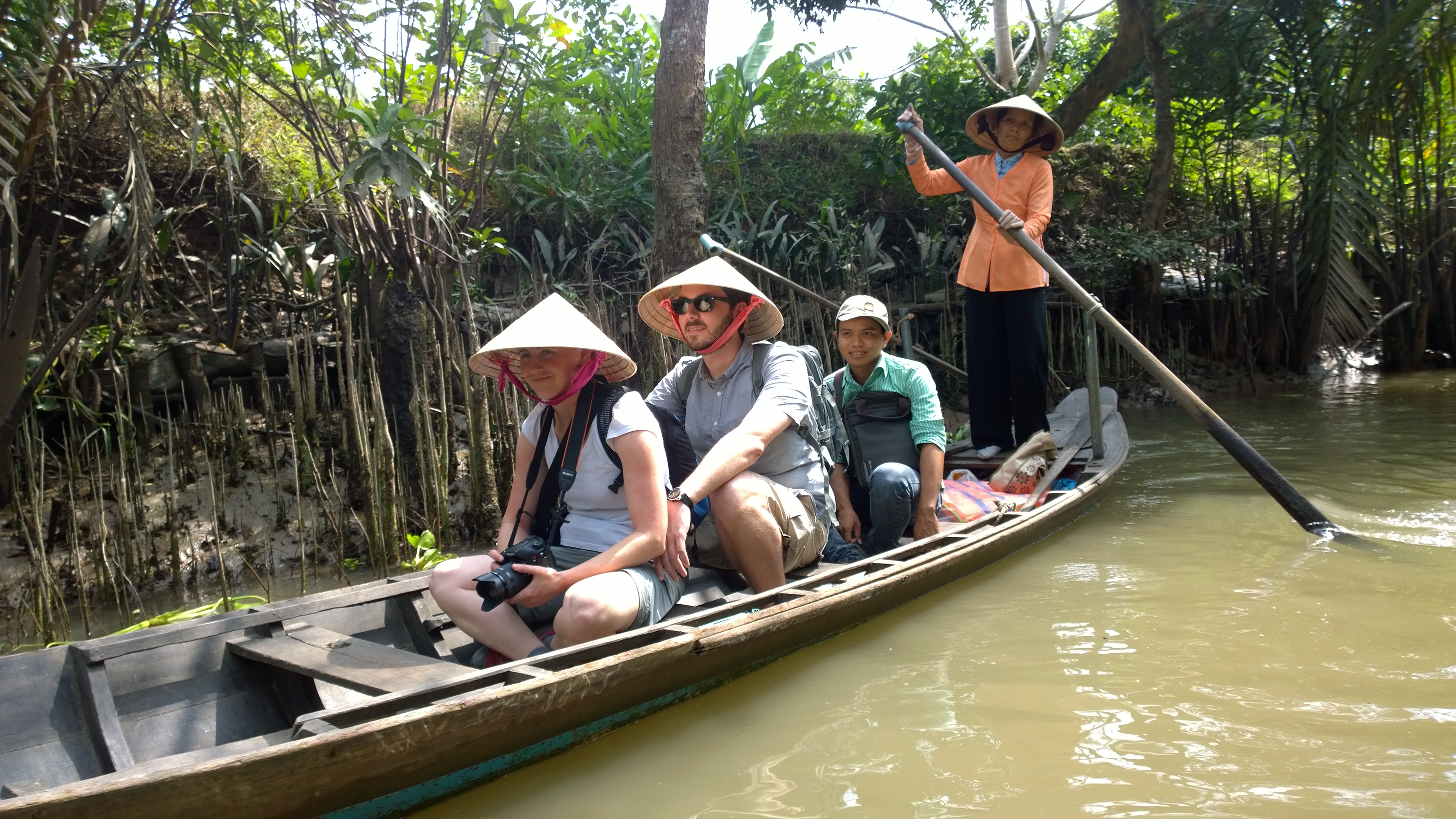
Ecotourism on Tan Phong island

The town lies on Highway 1A, which links Ho Chi Minh City with the Mekong delta, and is near a continuous ribbon of commercial development. The hinterland is largely agricultural, with many small holdings specialising in growing a variety of fruits, including custard apples, sweet mango and pomelos in the fertile delta soils.
