= Tân Phước =

Tân Phước may refer to several places in Vietnam:

- Tân Phước, Ho Chi Minh City: a ward in the former Phú Mỹ city, Bà Rịa–Vũng Tàu province
- Tân Phước district: a former district of Tiền Giang province, dissolved in 2025 as part of the 2025 Vietnamese administrative reform
- Tân Phước 1: a commune in Đồng Tháp province, Vietnam
- Tân Phước 2: a commune in Đồng Tháp province, Vietnam
- Tân Phước 3: a commune in Đồng Tháp province, Vietnam
- Tân Phước, Bình Thuận: formerly a ward of La Gi, now part of Phước Hội, Lâm Đồng
- Tân Phước, Bình Phước: formerly a commune of Đồng Phú district, now part of Đồng Tâm, Đồng Nai
- Tân Phước, Gò Công Đông: formerly a commune of Gò Công Đông district, now part of Tân Đông, Đồng Tháp
- Tân Phước, Lai Vung: formerly a commune of Lai Vung district in Đồng Tháp province, now part of Lai Vung
- Tân Phước, Tân Hồng: formerly a commune of Tân Hồng district in Đồng Tháp province, now part of An Phước, Đồng Tháp
