= Long Định =

- Commune
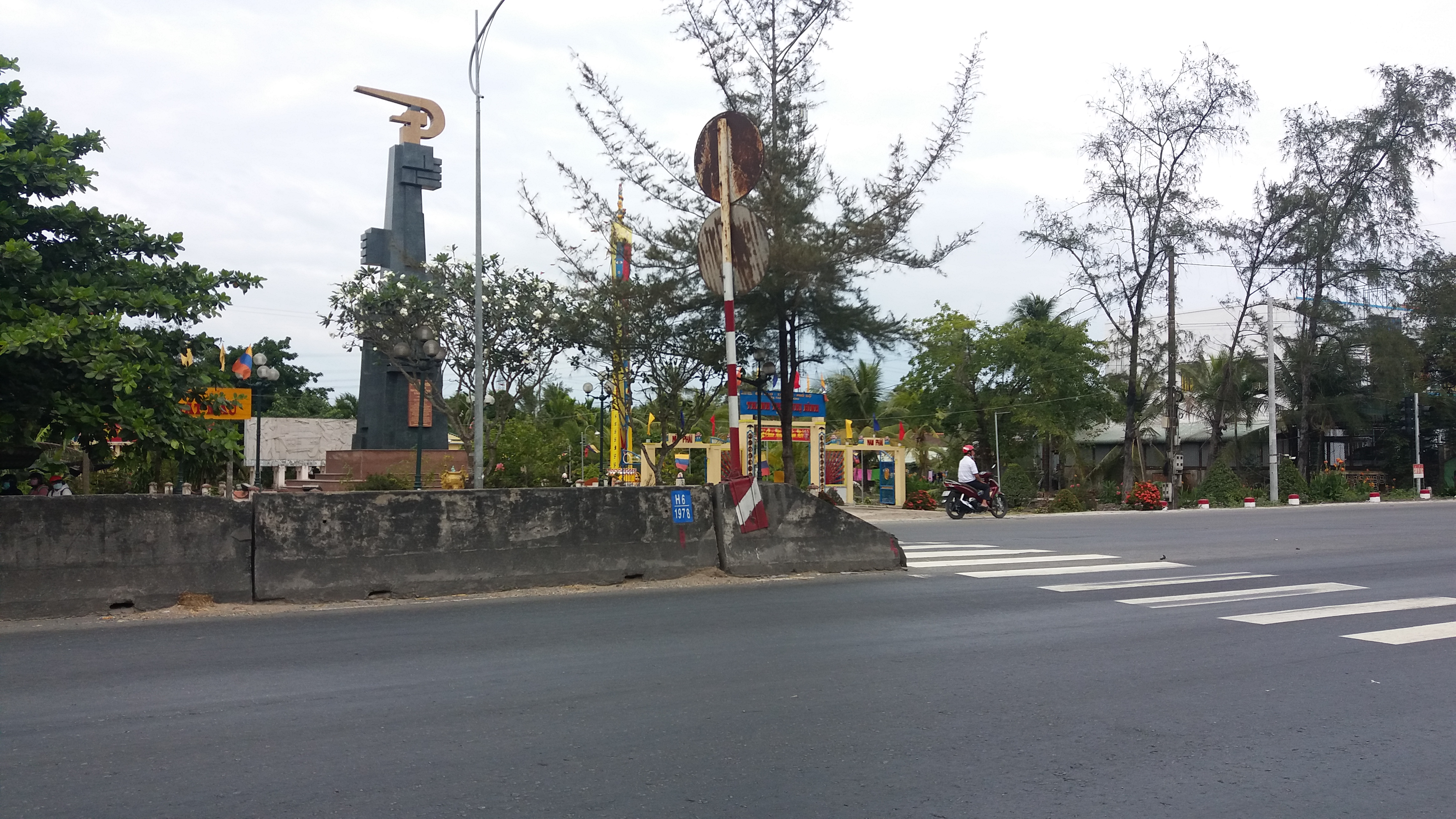
- Nhị Bình intersection in Long Định commune
- Interactive map of Long Định
- Country: Vietnam
- Province: Đồng Tháp
- Establish: June 16, 2025

Area
  - Total: 43.8 km^{2} (16.9 sq mi)

Population (2025)
  - Total: 48,391 people
  - Density: 1,100/km^{2} (2,860/sq mi)
- Time zone: UTC+07:00

Long Định is a commune in Đồng Tháp province. It is one of 102 communes and wards in the province after the 2025 reorganization.

== Geography ==
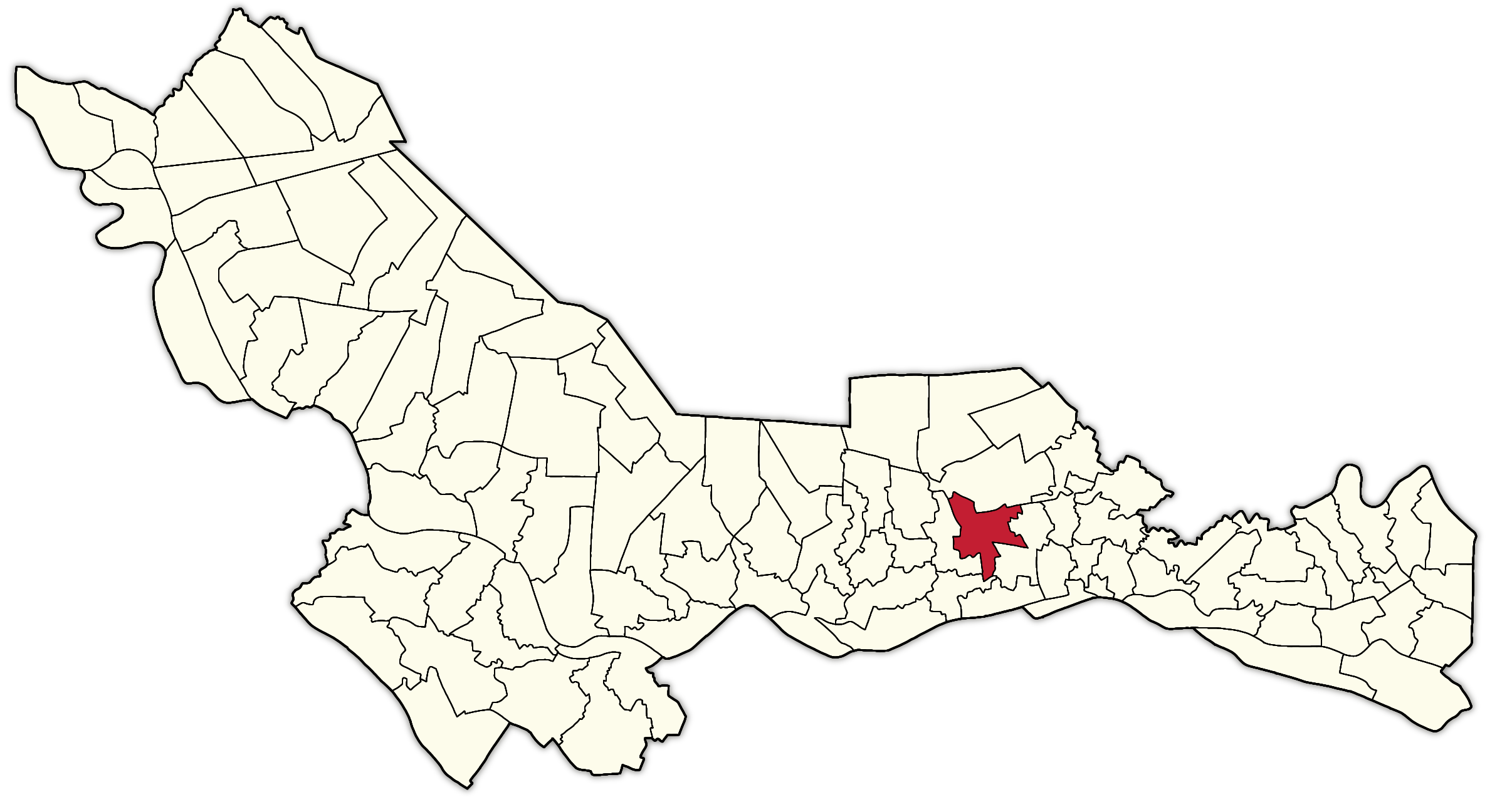
Location of Long Định commune in Đồng Tháp province map (highlight in red).

Long Định is a commune located in the eastern part of Đồng Tháp province, 90km east of Cao Lãnh ward and 15km west of Mỹ Tho ward. The commune has a geographical location:

- To the east, it borders Long Hưng commune.
- To the north, it borders Tân Phước 3 commune.
- To the west, it borders Bình Trưng commune.
- To the south, it borders Vĩnh Kim commune.

== History ==
Prior to 2025, Long Định commune was formerly Đông Hòa commune, Long Định commune, and Nhị Bình commune in Châu Thành district, Tiền Giang province.

On June 12, 2025, the National Assembly of Vietnam issued Resolution No. 202/2025/QH15 on the reorganization of provincial-level administrative units. Accordingly:

- Đồng Tháp province was established by merging the entire area and population of Đồng Tháp province and Tiền Giang province.

On June 16, 2025, the Standing Committee of the National Assembly of Vietnam issued Resolution No. 1663/NQ-UBTVQH15 on the reorganization of commune-level administrative units in Đồng Tháp province. Accordingly:

- Long Định commune was established by merging the entire area and population of Đông Hòa commune, Long Định commune, and Nhị Bình commune (formerly part of Châu Thành district; excerpt from Clause 61, Article 1).
