= Long Hưng, Đồng Tháp =

Long Hưng
- Commune
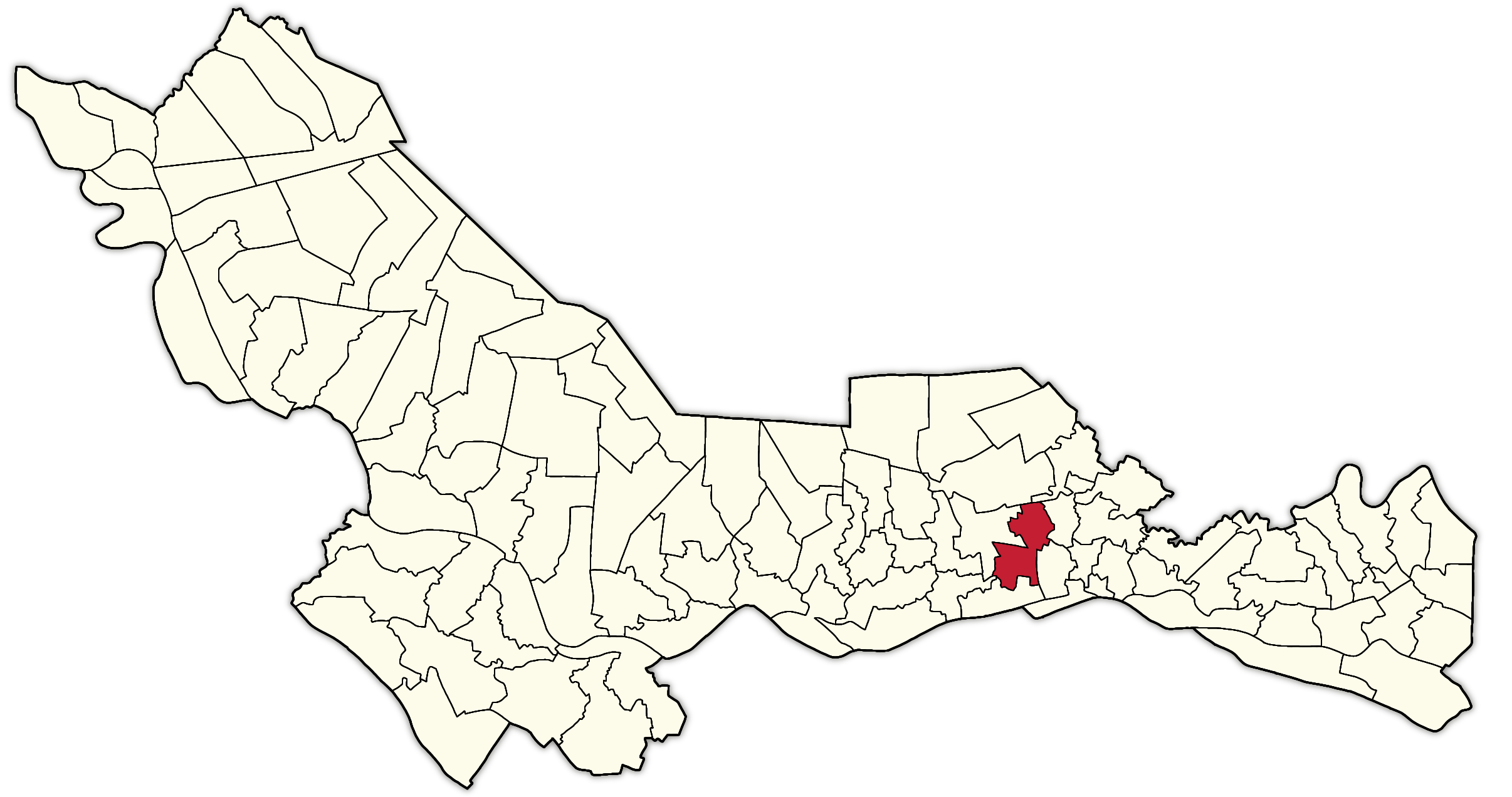
- Location of Long Hưng commune on Đồng Tháp province map (highlight in red).
- Interactive map of Long Hưng
- Country: Vietnam
- Province: Đồng Tháp province
- Establish: June 16, 2025

Area
  - Total: 43.3 km^{2} (16.7 sq mi)

Population (2025)
  - Total: 47,304 people
  - Density: 1,090/km^{2} (2,830/sq mi)
- Time zone: UTC+07:00

Long Hưng is a commune in Đồng Tháp province, Vietnam. It is one of 102 communes and wards in the province after the 2025 reorganization.

== Geography ==
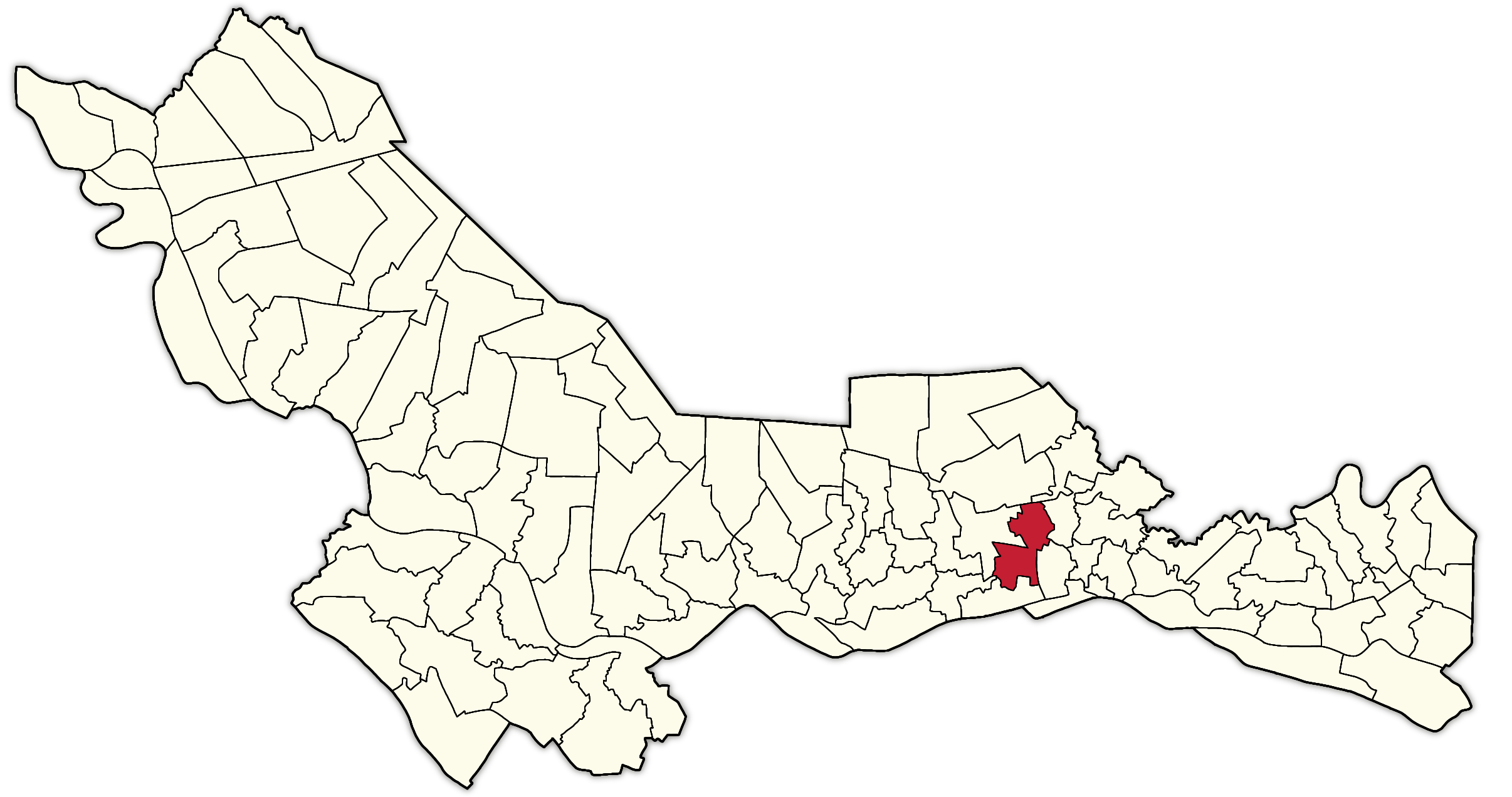
Location of Long Hưng commune on Đồng Tháp province map (highlight in red).

Long Hưng is a commune located in the eastern part of Đồng Tháp province. The commune has the following geographical location:

- To the east, it borders Châu Thành commune and Trung An ward.
- To the south, it borders Vĩnh Kim commune and Kim Sơn commune.
- To the west, it borders Long Định commune.
- To the north, it borders Tân Hương commune and Tân Phước 3 commune.

== History ==
Prior to 2025, Long Hưng commune was formerly Tam Hiệp commune, Thạnh Phú commune, and Long Hưng commune in Châu Thành district, Tiền Giang province.

On June 12, 2025, the National Assembly of Vietnam issued Resolution No. 202/2025/QH15 on the reorganization of provincial-level administrative units. Accordingly:

- Đồng Tháp province was established by merging the entire area and population of Đồng Tháp province and Tiền Giang province.

On June 16, 2025, the Standing Committee of the National Assembly of Vietnam issued Resolution No. 1663/NQ-UBTVQH15 on the reorganization of commune-level administrative units in Đồng Tháp province. Accordingly:

- Long Hưng commune was established by merging the entire area and population of Tam Hiệp commune, Thạnh Phú commune, and Long Hưng commune (formerly part of Châu Thành district; excerpt from Clause 60, Article 1).
