= Kim Sơn, Đồng Tháp =

Kim Sơn
- Commune
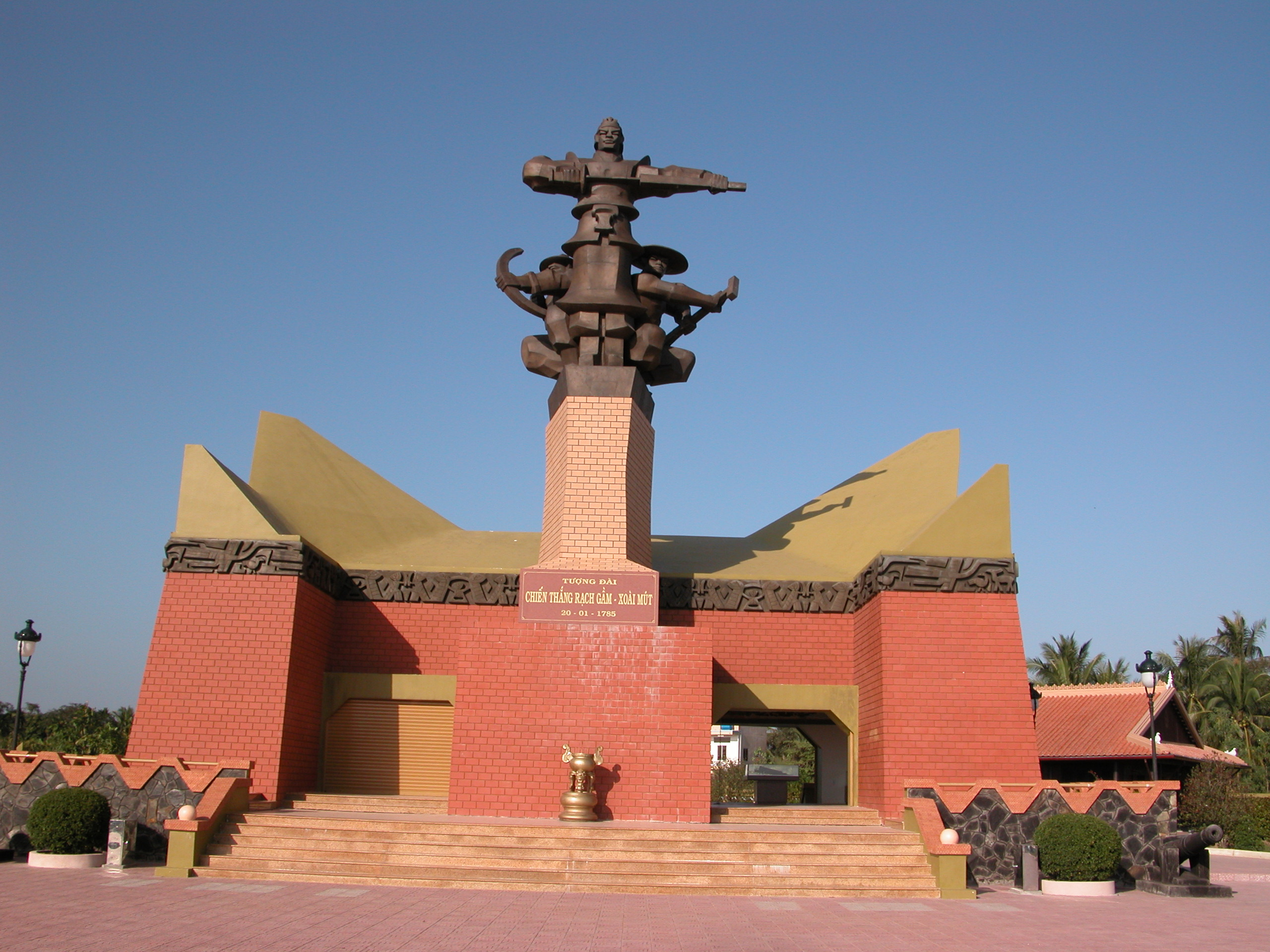
- Rạch Gầm - Xoài Mút Victory Monument
- Interactive map of Kim Sơn
- Country: Vietnam
- Province: Đồng Tháp
- Establish: June 16, 2025

Area
  - Total: 29.4 km^{2} (11.4 sq mi)

Population (2025)
  - Total: 29,382 people
  - Density: 999/km^{2} (2,590/sq mi)
- Time zone: UTC+07:00

Kim Sơn is a commune in Đồng Tháp province, Vietnam. It is one of 102 communes and wards in the province after the 2025 reorganization.

== Geography ==
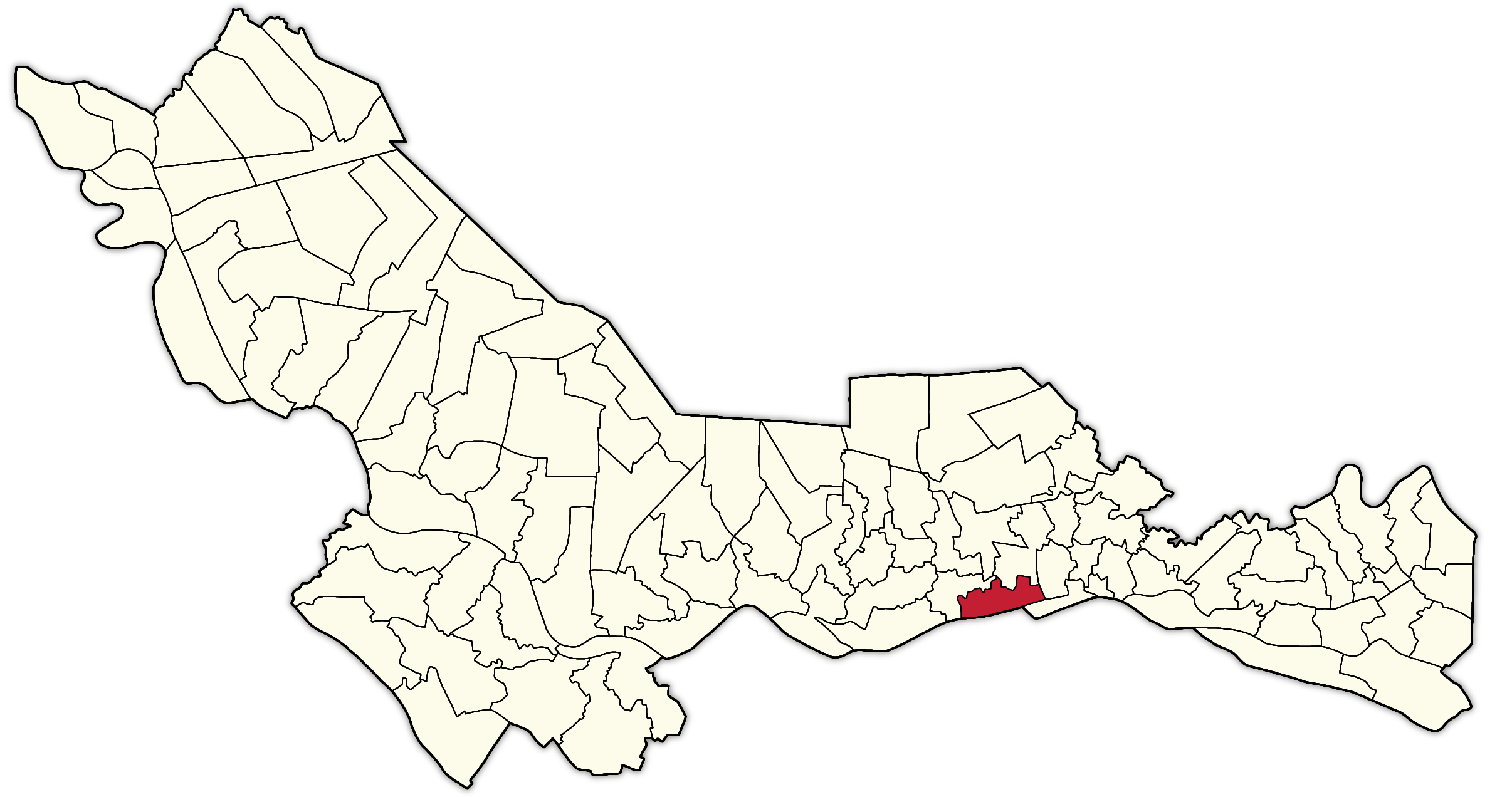
Location of Kim Sơn commune in Đồng Tháp province map (highlight in red).

Kim Sơn is a commune located in the eastern part of Đồng Tháp province, 90km east of Cao Lãnh ward and 15km west of Mỹ Tho ward. The commune has the following geographical location:

- To the east, it borders Trung An ward.
- To the west and northwest, it borders Vĩnh Kim commune.
- To the north, it borders Long Hưng commune.
- To the south, it borders Thới Sơn ward and Vĩnh Long province.

== History ==
Prior to 2025, Kim Sơn commune was formerly Song Thuận commune, Bình Đức commune, and Kim Sơn commune in Châu Thành district, Tiền Giang province.

On June 12, 2025, the National Assembly of Vietnam issued Resolution No. 202/2025/QH15 on the reorganization of provincial-level administrative units. Accordingly:

- Đồng Tháp province was established by merging the entire area and population of Đồng Tháp province and Tiền Giang province.

On June 16, 2025, the Standing Committee of the National Assembly of Vietnam issued Resolution No. 1663/NQ-UBTVQH15 on the reorganization of commune-level administrative units in Đồng Tháp province. Accordingly:

- Kim Sơn commune was established by merging the entire area and population of Bình Đức commune, Kim Sơn commune, and Song Thuận commune (formerly part of Châu Thành district; excerpt from Clause 64, Article 1).
