= Tân Hương =

- Commune
- Interactive map of Tân Hương
- Country: Vietnam
- Province: Đồng Tháp
- Establish: June 16, 2025

Area
  - Total: 35.05 km^{2} (13.53 sq mi)

Population
  - Total: 67,210 people
  - Density: 1,918/km^{2} (4,966/sq mi)
- Time zone: UTC+07:00

Tân Hương is a commune in Đồng Tháp province, Vietnam. It is one of 102 communes and wards in the province following the 2025 reorganization.

== Geography ==
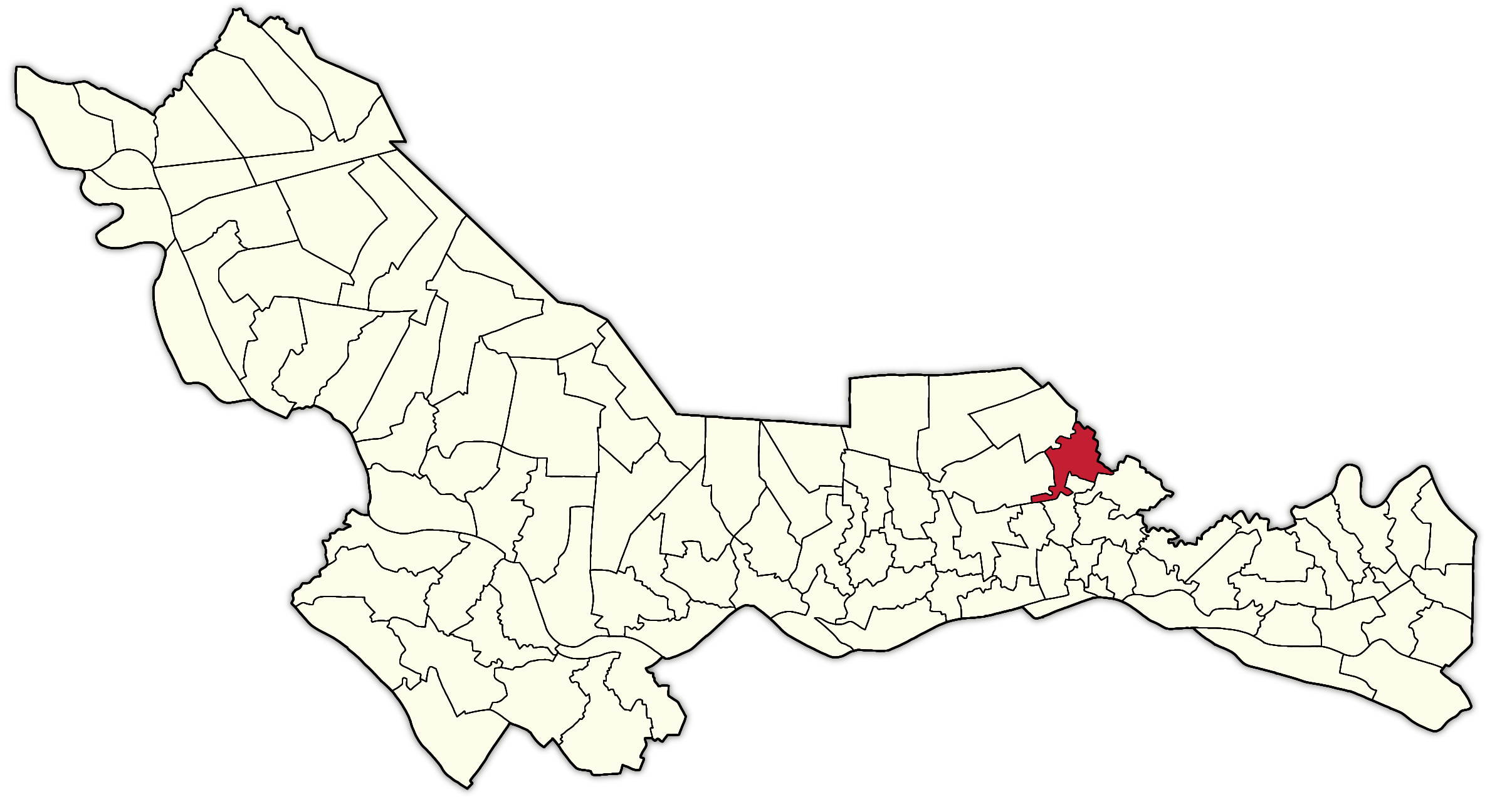
Location of Tân Hương commune on Đồng Tháp province map (highlight in red).

Tân Hương is a commune located in the eastern part of Đồng Tháp province. It serves as a northeastern gateway for transportation from Hồ Chí Minh city to the Mekong Delta and vice versa. The commune has a geographical location:

- To the south, it borders Châu Thành commune and Long Hưng commune.
- To the southeast, it borders Mỹ Tịnh An commune.
- To the northeast, it borders Tây Ninh province.
- To the west, it borders Tân Phước 3 commune and Hưng Thạnh commune.

== History ==
Prior to 2025, Tân Hương commune was formerly Tân Lý Đông, Tân Hội Đông, and Tân Hương communes in Châu Thành district, Tiền Giang province.

On June 12, 2025, the National Assembly of Vietnam issued Resolution No. 202/2025/QH15 on the reorganization of provincial-level administrative units. Accordingly:

- Đồng Tháp province was established by merging the entire area and population of Đồng Tháp province and Tiền Giang province.

On June 16, 2025, the Standing Committee of the National Assembly of Vietnam issued Resolution No. 1663/NQ-UBTVQH15 on the reorganization of commune-level administrative units in Đồng Tháp province. Accordingly:

- Tân Hương commune was established by merging the entire area and population of Tân Lý Đông, Tân Hội Đông, and Tân Hương communes (formerly part of Châu Thành district).
