= Hưng Thạnh =

- Commune
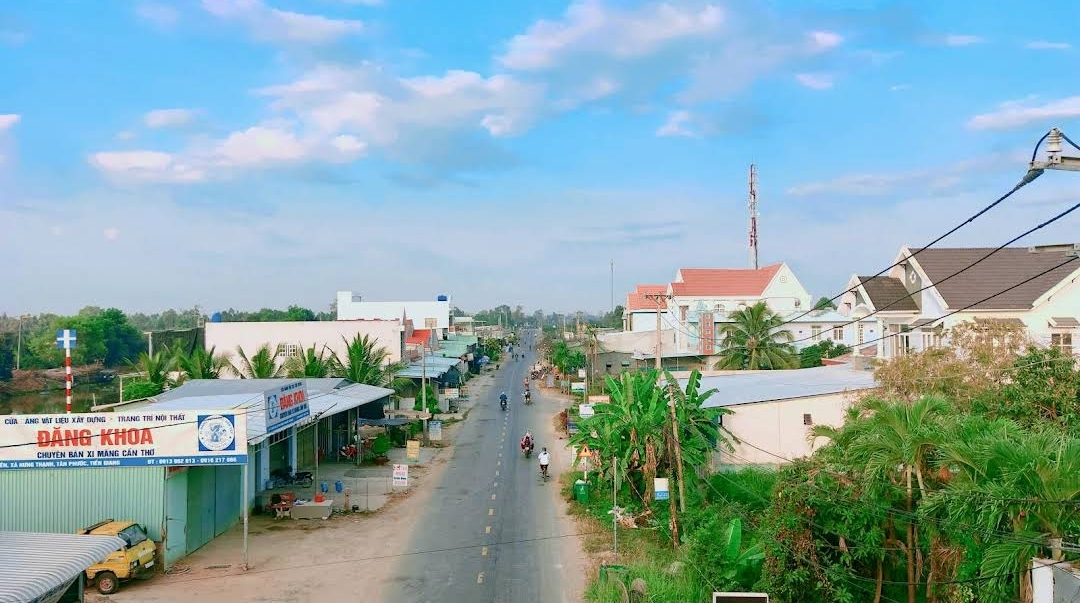
- Interactive map of Hưng Thạnh
- Country: Vietnam
- Province: Đồng Tháp
- Establish: June 16, 2025

Area
  - Total: 65.15 km^{2} (25.15 sq mi)

Population
  - Total: 31,368 people
  - Density: 481.5/km^{2} (1,247/sq mi)
- Time zone: UTC+07:00

Hưng Thạnh is a commune in Đồng Tháp province, Vietnam. It is one of 102 communes and wards in the province following the 2025 reorganization.

== Geography ==
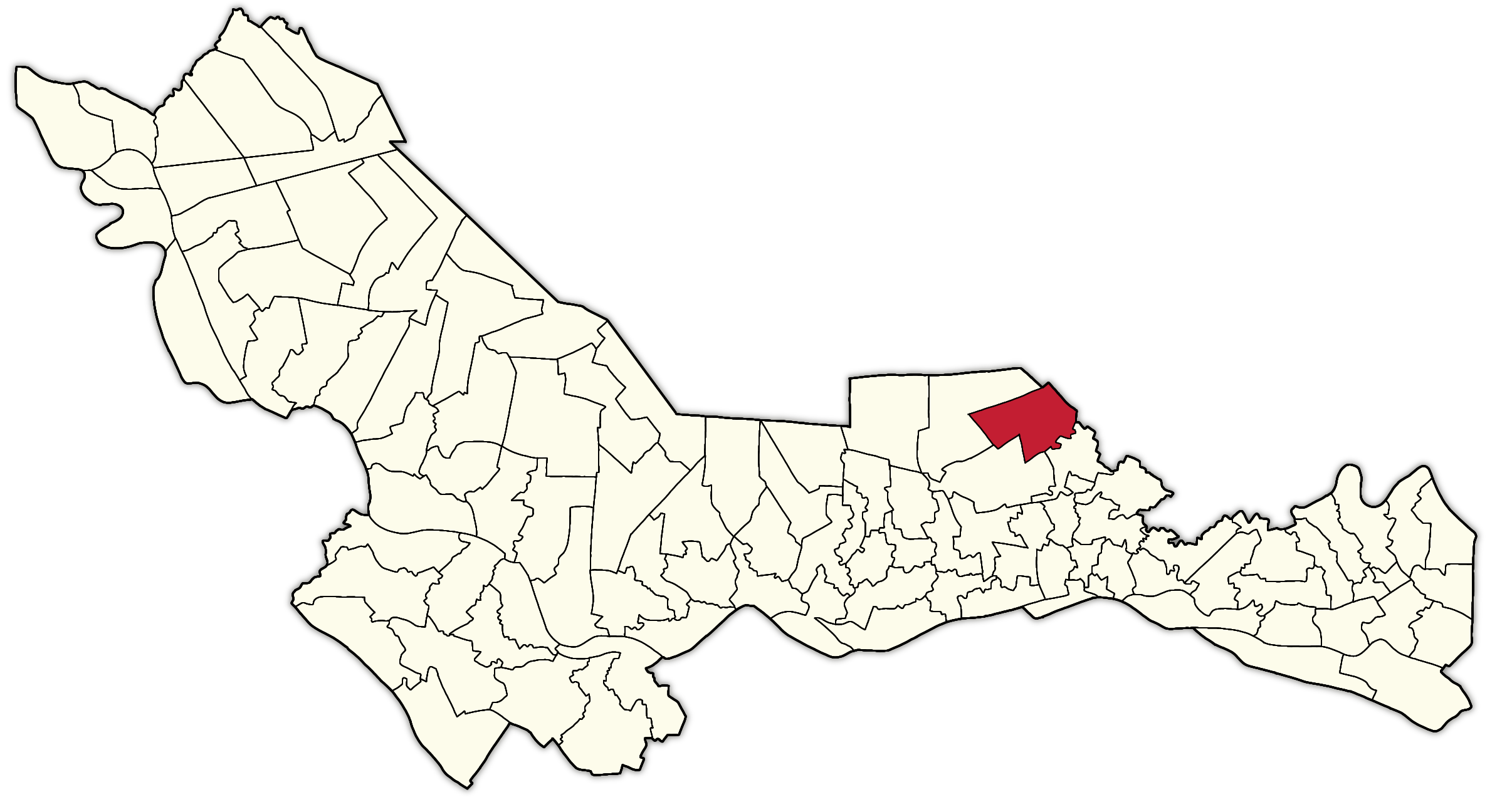
Location of Hưng Thạnh commune on Đồng Tháp province map (highlight in red).

Hưng Thạnh is a commune located in the eastern part of Đồng Tháp province, 90 km east of Cao Lãnh ward and 25 km northwest of Mỹ Tho ward. The commune has the following geographical location:

- To the northeast, it borders Tây Ninh province.
- To the southeast, it borders Tân Hương commune.
- To the south, it borders Tân Phước 3 commune.
- To the west and northwest, it borders Tân Phước 1 commune.

== History ==
Prior to 2025, Hưng Thạnh commune was formerly Hưng Thạnh, Phú Mỹ, and Tân Hòa communes belonging to Tân Phước district, Tiền Giang province.

On June 12, 2025, the National Assembly of Vietnam issued Resolution No. 202/2025/QH15 on the reorganization of provincial-level administrative units. Accordingly:

- Đồng Tháp province was established by merging the entire area and population of Đồng Tháp province and Tiền Giang province.

On June 16, 2025, the Standing Committee of the National Assembly of Vietnam issued Resolution No. 1663/NQ-UBTVQH15 on the reorganization of commune-level administrative units in Đồng Tháp province. Accordingly:

- Hưng Thạnh commune was established by merging the entire area and population of Hưng Thạnh commune, Phú Mỹ commune, and Tân Hòa commune (formerly part of Tân Phước district).
- After the reorganization, the new Hưng Thạnh commune has an area of 65.15 km² and a population of 31,368 people.
