= Vĩnh Kim =

- Ward
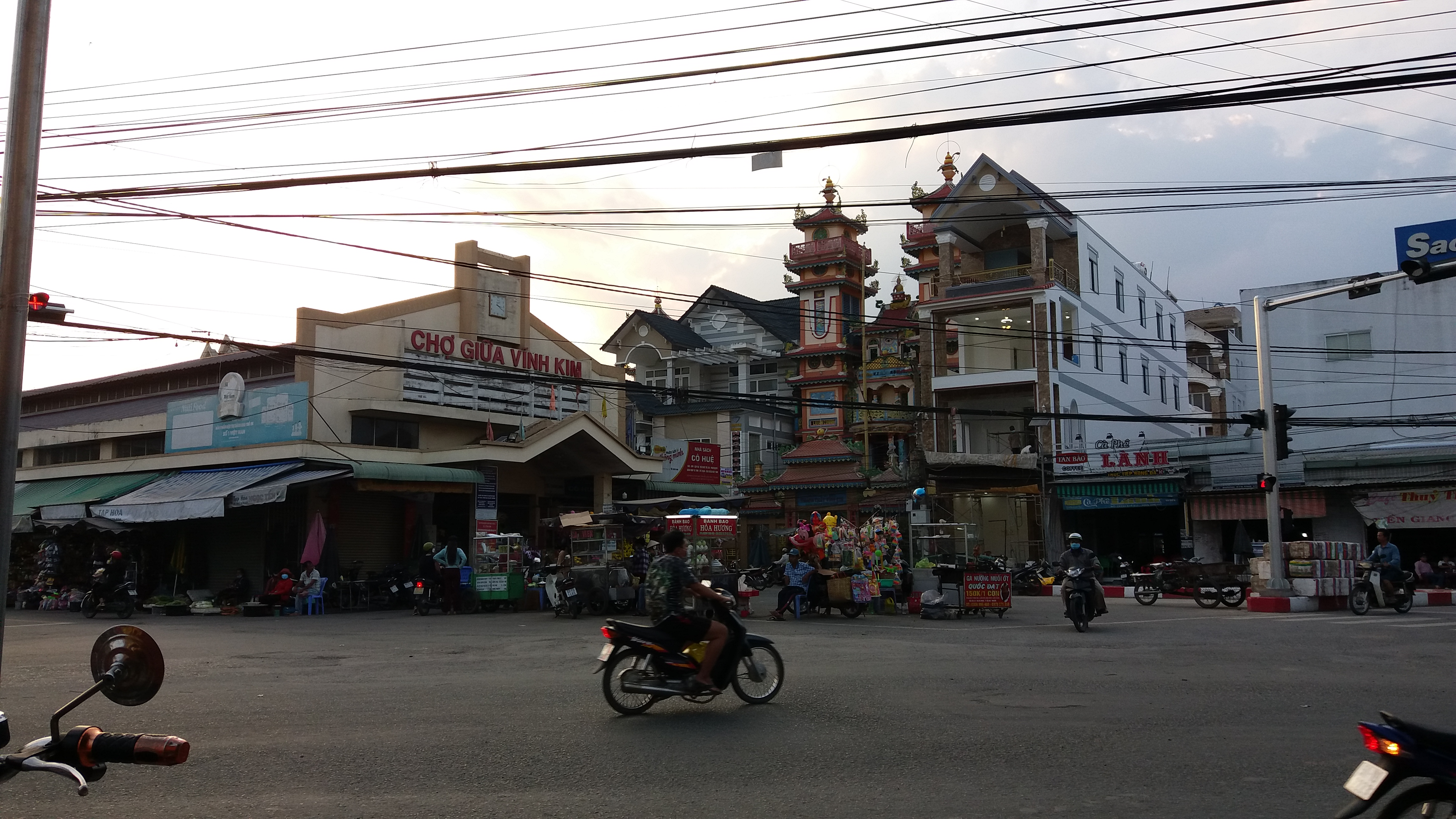
- Vĩnh Kim central market
- Interactive map of Vĩnh Kim
- Coordinates: 10°21′00″N 106°12′45″E
- Country: Vietnam
- Province: Đồng Tháp
- Establish: June 16, 2025
- Become a ward: May 11, 2026
- Headquarters of the People's Committee: in District road 35, Vĩnh Thạnh hamlet

Area
  - Total: 25.6 km^{2} (9.9 sq mi)

Population (2025)
  - Total: 31,466 people
  - Density: 1,230/km^{2} (3,180/sq mi)

Vĩnh Kim is a ward in Đồng Tháp province, Vietnam. It is one of 102 communes and wards in the province.

== Geography ==
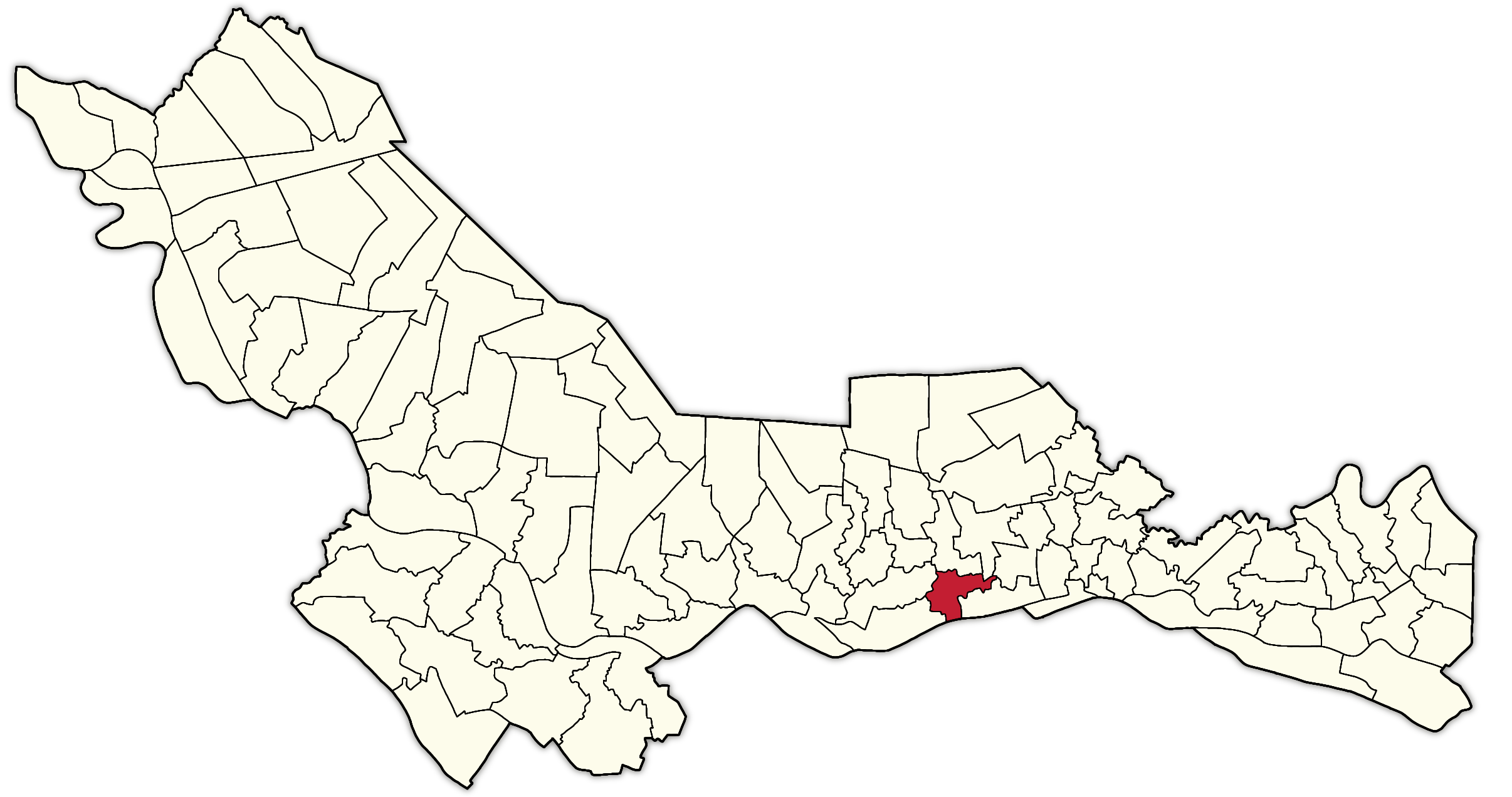
Location of Vĩnh Kim ward in Đồng Tháp province map (highlight in red).

Vĩnh Kim ward is located along the Tiền river. It is approximately 20 km west of Mỹ Tho ward and 90 km east of Cao Lãnh ward. The commune has the following geographical location:

- To the east, it borders Kim Sơn commune.
- To the south, it borders Tân Phú commune, Vĩnh Long province (the boundary is the Tiền river).
- To the west, it borders Long Tiên commune and Ngũ Hiệp commune.
- To the north, it borders Bình Trưng commune and Long Định commune.

== History ==
Prior to 2025, Vĩnh Kim ward was formerly Vĩnh Kim commune, Phú Phong commune, and Bàn Long commune in Châu Thành district, Tiền Giang province.

On June 12, 2025, the National Assembly of Vietnam issued Resolution No. 202/2025/QH15 on the reorganization of provincial-level administrative units. Accordingly:

- Đồng Tháp province was established by merging the entire area and population of Đồng Tháp province and Tiền Giang province.

On June 16, 2025, the Standing Committee of the National Assembly of Vietnam issued Resolution No. 1663/NQ-UBTVQH15 on the reorganization of commune-level administrative units in Đồng Tháp province. Accordingly:

- Vĩnh Kim commune was established by merging the entire area and population of Vĩnh Kim commune, Phú Phong commune, and Bàn Long commune (formerly part of Châu Thành district; excerpt from Clause 63, Article 1).

On May 11, 2026, the People's Council of Đồng Tháp province approved the plan to establish 11 new wards in the province. Accordingly:

- The Vĩnh Kim ward was established based on the entire area and population of Vĩnh Kim commune.
