= Tân Phước 3 =

Commune in Đồng Tháp province, Vietnam

- Commune
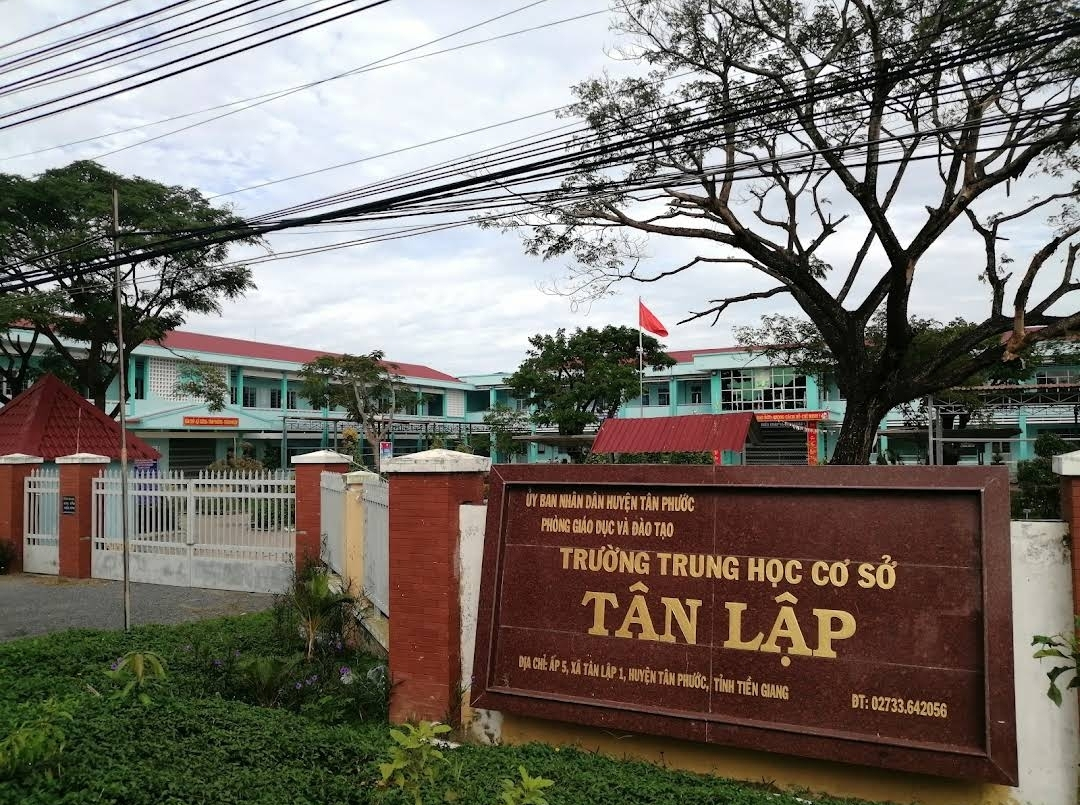
- Tân Lập Lower Secondary School in Tân Phước 3.
- Interactive map of Tân Phước 3
- Country: Vietnam
- Province: Đồng Tháp
- Establish: June 16, 2025

Area
  - Total: 80.19 km^{2} (30.96 sq mi)

Population (2025)
  - Total: 11,927 people
  - Density: 148.7/km^{2} (385.2/sq mi)
- Time zone: UTC+07:00

Tân Phước 3 is a commune in Đồng Tháp province, Vietnam. It is one of 102 communes and wards in the province following the 2025 administrative reform in Vietnam.

== Geography ==
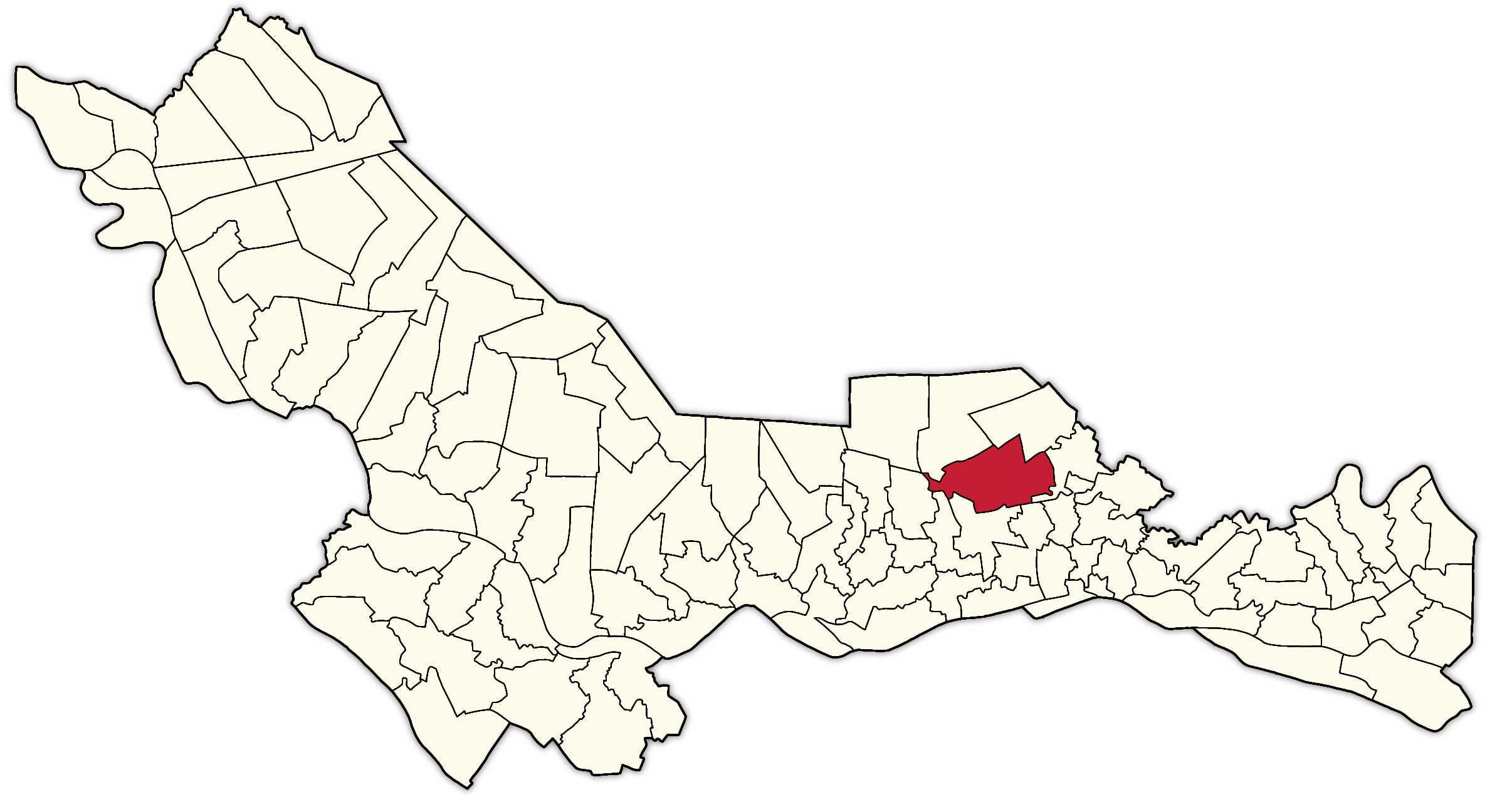
Location of Tân Phước 3 on Đồng Tháp province map (highlight in red).

Tan Phuoc 3 is a commune located in the northeastern part of Đồng Tháp province, approximately 95 km east of Cao Lãnh ward and about 20 km north of Mỹ Tho ward. The commune has the following geographical location:

- To the north, it borders Tân Phước 1 commune and Hưng Thạnh commune.
- To the west, it borders Tân Phú commune.
- To the south, it borders Bình Trưng commune, Long Định commune, and Long Hưng commune.
- To the east, it borders Tân Hương commune.

== History ==
Prior to 2025, Tân Phước 3 commune was formerly Tân Lập commune, Tân Lập 2 commune, and Phước Lập commune in Tân Phước district, Tiền Giang province.

On June 12, 2025, the National Assembly of Vietnam issued Resolution No. 202/2025/QH15 on the reorganization of provincial-level administrative units. Accordingly:

- Đồng Tháp province was established by merging the entire area and population of Đồng Tháp province and Tiền Giang province.

On June 16, 2025, the Standing Committee of the National Assembly of Vietnam issued Resolution No. 1663/NQ-UBTVQH15 on the reorganization of commune-level administrative units in Đồng Tháp province. Accordingly:

- Tân Phước 3 commune was established by merging the entire area and population of Tân Lập 1 commune, Tân Lập 2 commune, and Phước Lập commune (formerly part of Tân Phước district).
