= Tân Phước 1 =

- Commune
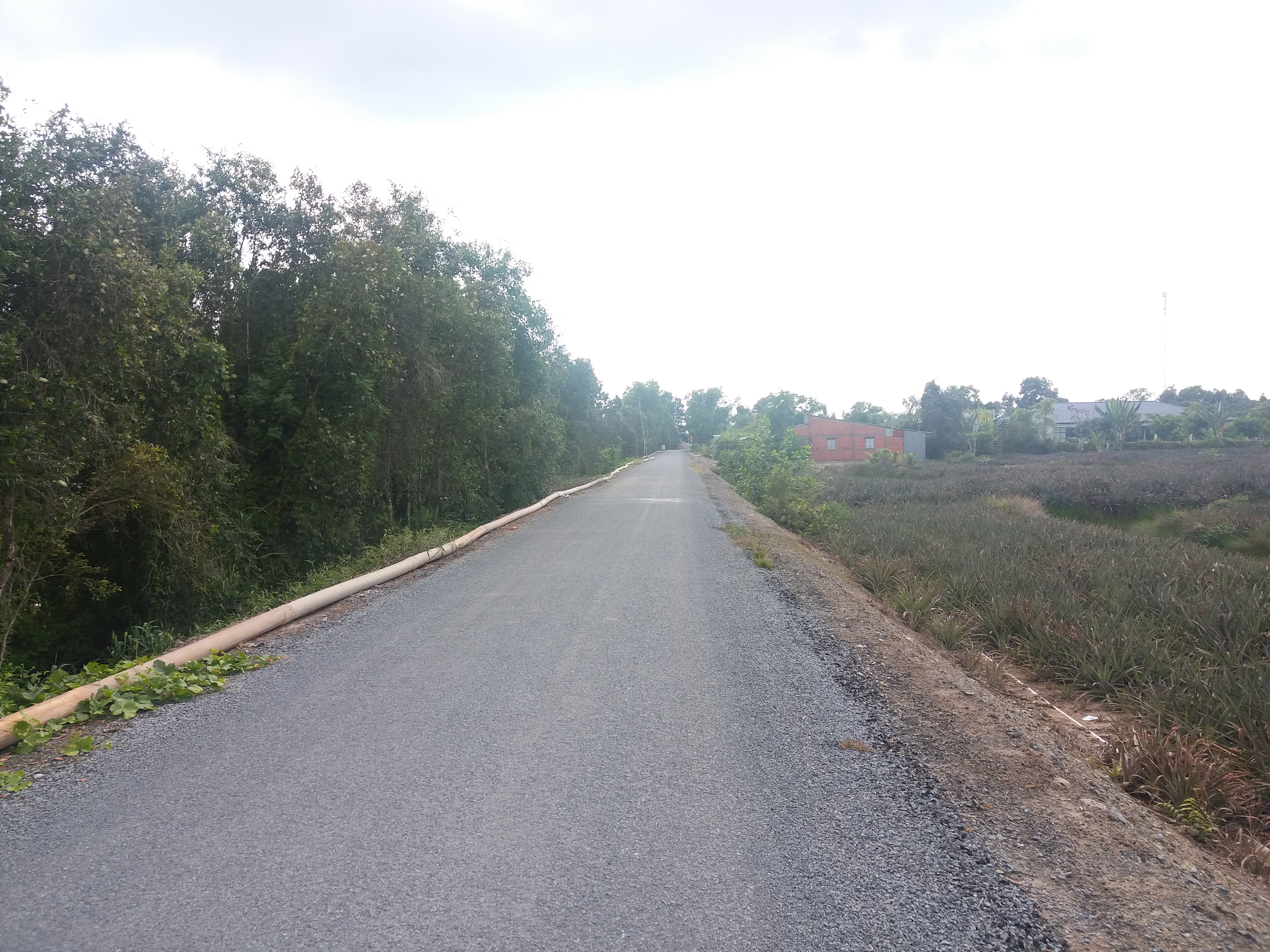
- A road in Tân Phước 1
- Interactive map of Tân Phước 1
- Coordinates: 10°31′40″N 106°12′35″E
- Country: Vietnam
- Region: Mekong Delta
- Province: Đồng Tháp
- Establish: June 16, 2025

Area
  - Total: 95.4 km^{2} (36.8 sq mi)

Population (2025)
  - Total: 12,836 people
  - Density: 135/km^{2} (348/sq mi)
- Time zone: UTC+07:00
- Administrative code: 28321

Tân Phước 1 is a commune in Đồng Tháp province, Vietnam. It is one of 102 communes and wards in the province following the 2025 reorganization.

== Geography ==
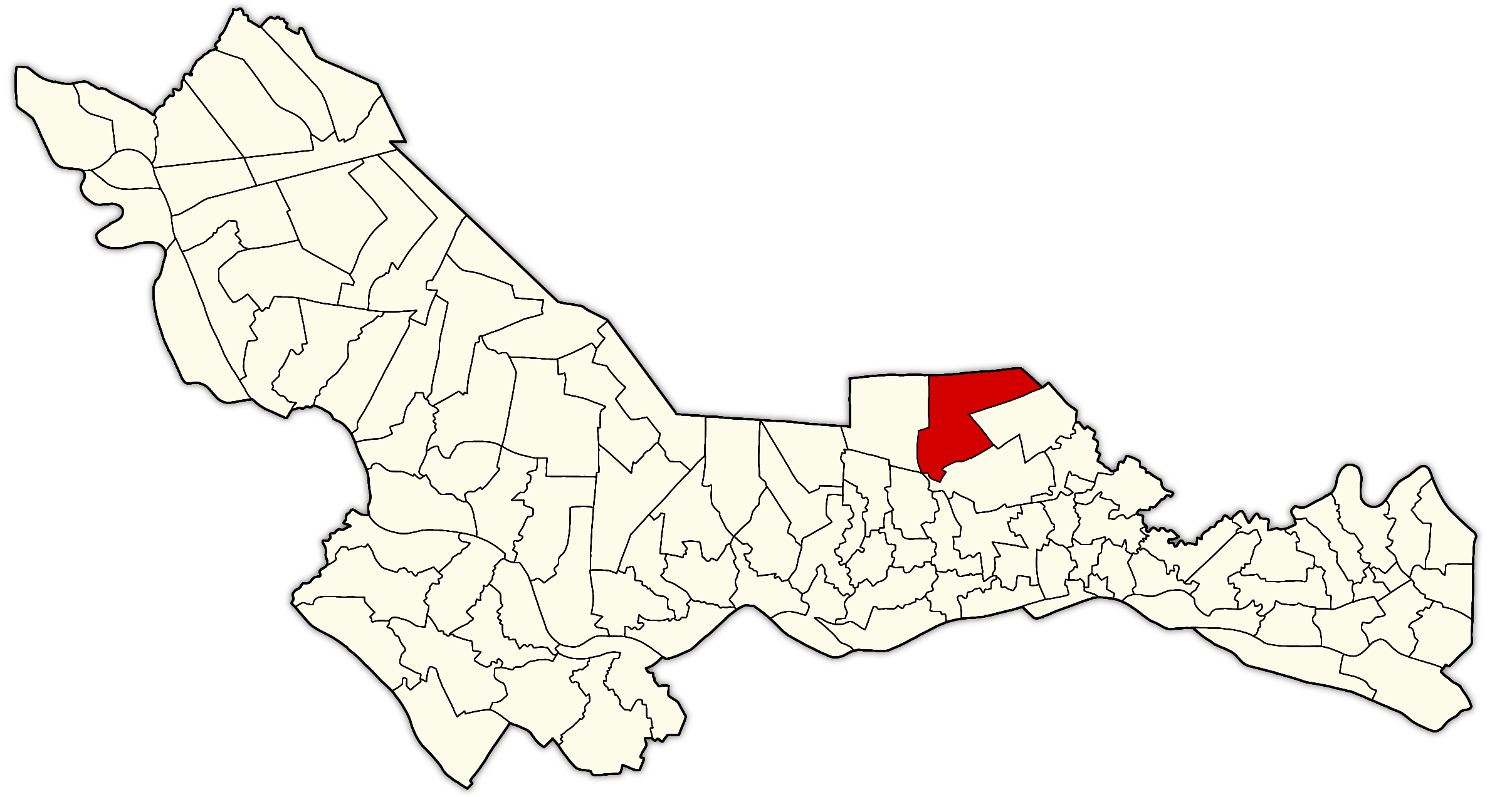
Location of Tân Phước 1 commune in Đồng Tháp province map (highlight in red).

Tân Phước 1 is a commune located in the eastern part of Đồng Tháp province, approximately 70km east of Cao Lãnh ward, 104km southeast of Hồng Ngự ward, and about 30km northwest of Mỹ Tho ward. The commune has a geographical location:

- To the north, it borders Tây Ninh province.
- To the east, it borders Hưng Thạnh commune.
- To the south, it borders Tân Phước 3 commune.
- To the west, it borders Tân Phước 2 commune.

The commune is divided into 13 hamlets: 1, 2, 3, 4, 5, Mỹ Hòa, Mỹ Lộc, Mỹ Thiện, Mỹ Thuận, Tân Long, Tân Phát, Tân Thành, Tân Thuận.

== History ==
Prior to 2025, Tân Phước 1 commune was formerly Mỹ Phước town and two communes: Thạnh Mỹ and Tân Hòa Đông, belonging to Tân Phước district, Tiền Giang province.

On June 12, 2025, the 15th National Assembly of Vietnam issued Resolution No. 202/2025/QH15 on the reorganization of provincial-level administrative units. Accordingly:

- The Đồng Tháp province was established by merging the entire area and population of Đồng Tháp province and Tiền Giang province.

On June 16 of the same year, the Standing Committee of the National Assembly of Vietnam issued Resolution No. 1663/NQ-UBTVQH15 on the reorganization of commune-level administrative units in Đồng Tháp province. Accordingly:

- Tân Phước 1 commune was established by merging the entire area and population of Mỹ Phước town and the two communes of Tân Hòa Đông and Thạnh Mỹ (formerly part of Tân Phước district).
