= Bình Trưng, Đồng Tháp =

Bình Trưng Xã Bình Trưng
- Commune
- Interactive map of Bình Trưng
- Coordinates: 10°22′34″N 106°13′08″E
- Country: Vietnam
- Province: Đồng Tháp province
- Established: June 16, 2025

Area
  - Total: 12.06 sq mi (31.23 km^{2})

Population (2024)
  - Total: 34,618
  - Density: 2,871/sq mi (1,108/km^{2})
- Time zone: UTC+07:00 (Indochina Time)
- Administrative code: 28564

Bình Trưng (Vietnamese: Xã Bình Trưng) is a commune of Đồng Tháp province, Vietnam. It is one of the 102 new wards, communes and special zones of the province following the reorganization in 2025.

== History ==
On June 16, 2025, the National Assembly Standing Committee issued Resolution No. 1663/NQ-UBTVQH15 on the arrangement of commune-level administrative units of Đồng Tháp province in 2025 (effective from June 16, 2025). Accordingly, the entire land area and population of Điềm Hy and Bình Trưng communes of the former Châu Thành district, Tiền Giang province will be integrated into a new commune named Bình Trưng (Clause 62, Article 1).
