= Tân Phước district =

Coordinates: 10.500°N 106.250°E

Tan Phuoc district Huyện Tân Phước Bà Bèo
- District
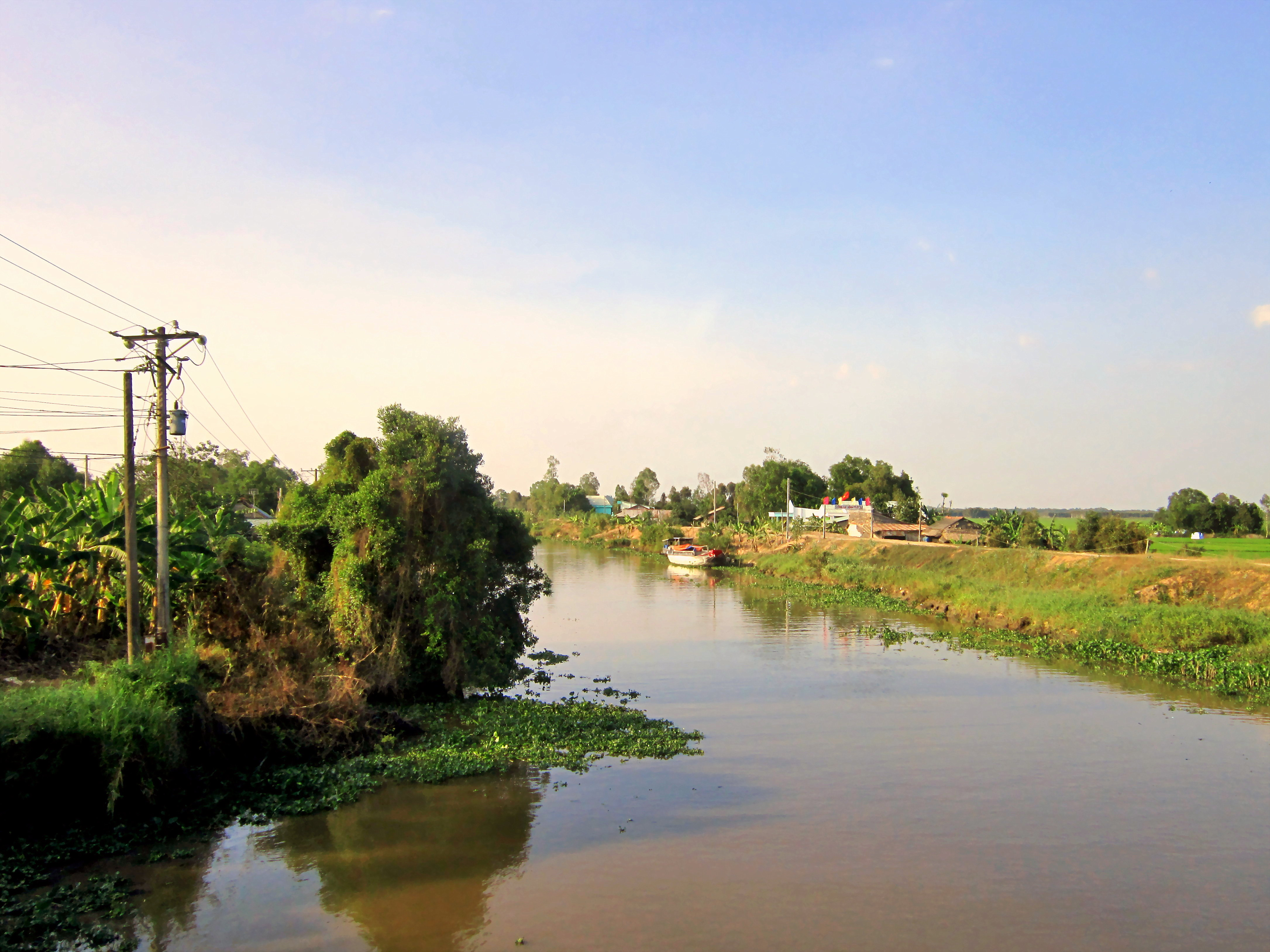
- View of the countryside
- Interactive map of Tan Phuoc district
- Country: Vietnam
- Region: Mekong Delta
- Province: Tien Giang
- Capital: Mỹ Phước

Area
  - Total: 128.65 sq mi (333.21 km^{2})

Population (2018)
  - Total: 63,032
  - Density: 490/sq mi (189/km^{2})
- Time zone: UTC+7 (UTC + 7)

Tân Phước is a rural district (huyện) of Tiền Giang province in the Mekong Delta region of Vietnam. As of 2018 the district had a population of 63,032. The district covers an area of 333.21 km^{2} (128.65 sq mi). The district capital lies at Mỹ Phước.
