= Châu Thành district, Tiền Giang =

Coordinates: 10°25′27″N 106°17′03″E

Chau Thanh District Huyện Châu Thành
- District
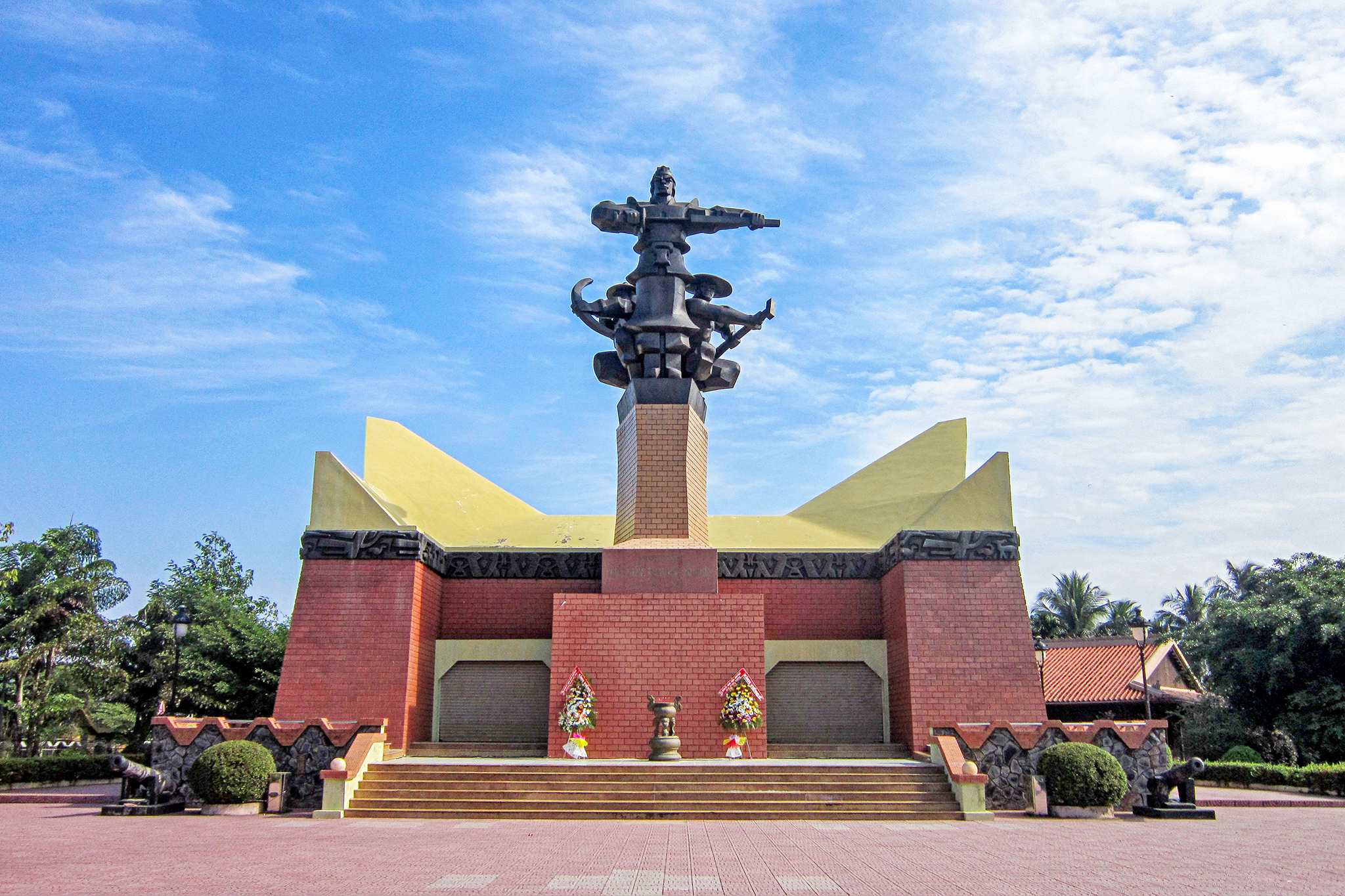
- Monument to celebrate the victory of Battle of Rạch Gầm-Xoài Mút
- Interactive map of Chau Thanh District
- Country: Vietnam
- Region: Mekong Delta
- Abolished: 2025
- Capital: Châu Thành

Area
  - Total: 25,092,431 sq mi (64,989,098 km^{2})

Population (2018)
  - Total: 252,068
- Time zone: UTC+7 (UTC + 7)

Châu Thành is a former rural district of Tien Giang province in the Mekong Delta region of Vietnam. As of 2003 the district had a population of 252,068. The district covers an area of 256 km^{2} (99 sq mi). The district capital lies at Tân Hiệp.
