= Yên Thắng =

Yên Thắng Phường Yên Thắng
- Ward
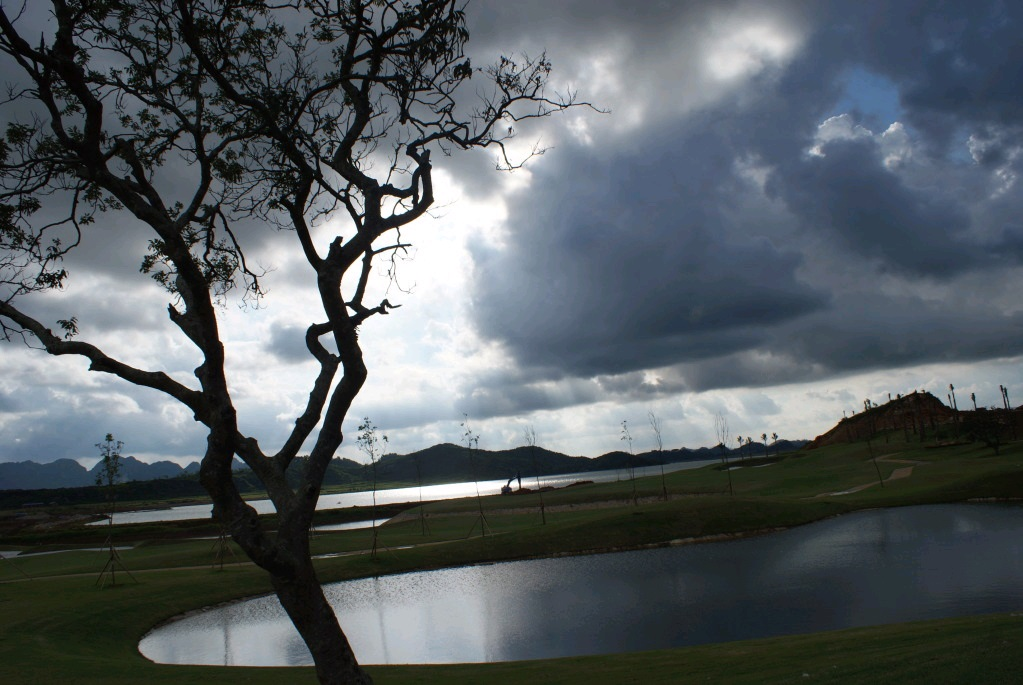
- Royal Golf Club
- Interactive map of Yên Thắng
- Location in Vietnam
- Country: Vietnam
- Regions: Red River Delta
- Province: Ninh Bình Province
- Established: June 16, 2025

Area
  - Total: 29.95 km^{2} (11.56 sq mi)

Population (2025)
  - Total: 28,405
  - Density: 948.4/km^{2} (2,456/sq mi)
- Time zone: UTC+07:00 (Indochina Time)

Yên Thắng is a ward (phường) of Ninh Bình Province, Vietnam.

== Geography ==
Yên Thắng Ward located in southern Ninh Bình Province, and adjacent to:

- Đông Hoa Lư Ward and Nam Hoa Lư Ward to the north
- Trung Sơn Ward and Đồng Thái Commune to the south
- Tam Điệp Ward and Yên Sơn Ward to the west
- Yên Mô Commune to the east.

== History ==
On June 12, 2025, the National Assembly of Vietnam issued Resolution No. 202/2025/QH15 on the arrangement of provincial-level administrative units (effective from June 12, 2025). Accordingly, the entire land area and population of Hà Nam Province, Nam Định Province and Ninh Bình Province were merged to form a new province named Ninh Bình Province.

On June 16, 2025, the Standing Committee of the National Assembly of Vietnam issued Resolution No. 1674/NQ-UBTVQH15 on the arrangement of commune-level administrative units of Ninh Bình Province in 2025 (effective from June 16, 2025). Accordingly, the entire land area and population of Yên Thắng Commune, Khánh Thượng Commune (Yên Mô District) và Yên Bình Ward (Tam Điệp City were merged to form a new ward named Yên Thắng Ward.
