= Hoa Lư =

Hoa Lư may refer to:

- Hoa Lư, ward and capital of Ninh Bình province
- Đông Hoa Lư, ward of Ninh Bình province
- Tây Hoa Lư, ward of Ninh Bình province
- Nam Hoa Lư, ward of Ninh Bình province.
- Hoa Lư (city), former provincial city and capital of Ninh Bình province
- Hoa Lư district, a former rural district of Ninh Bình province; then it is a part of Hoa Lu (city)
- Hoa Lư Ancient Capital, a historical capital of Vietnam
