= Tân Bình =

Tân Bình may refer to several places in Vietnam, including:

- Tân Bình District, an urban district of Ho Chi Minh City
- Tân Bình, Hải Dương, a ward of Hải Dương
- Tân Bình, Ninh Bình, a ward of Tam Điệp
- Tân Bình, Bình Phước, a ward of Đồng Xoài
- Tân Bình, Dĩ An, a ward of Dĩ An in Bình Dương Province
- Tân Bình, Tuyên Quang, a township of Yên Sơn District
- Tân Bình, Tây Ninh City, a commune of Tây Ninh in Tây Ninh Province
- Tân Bình, Thái Bình, a commune of Thái Bình
- Tân Bình, Bình Thuận, a commune of La Gi
- Tân Bình, Tiền Giang, a commune of Cai Lậy
- Tân Bình, Bến Tre, a commune of Mỏ Cày Bắc District
- Tân Bình, Bắc Tân Uyên, a commune of Bắc Tân Uyên District in Bình Dương Province
- Tân Bình, Đồng Nai, a commune of Vĩnh Cửu District
- Tân Bình, Châu Thành, a commune of Châu Thành District, Đồng Tháp Province
- Tân Bình, Thanh Bình, a commune of Thanh Bình District in Đồng Tháp Province
- Tân Bình, Gia Lai, a commune of Đắk Đoa District
- Tân Bình, Hậu Giang, a commune of Phụng Hiệp District
- Tân Bình, Long An, a commune of Tân Thạnh District
- Tân Bình, Quảng Ninh, a commune of Đầm Hà District
- Tân Bình, Tân Biên, a commune of Tân Biên District in Tây Ninh Province
- Tân Bình, Thanh Hóa, a commune of Như Xuân District
- Tân Bình, Trà Vinh, a commune of Càng Long District
- Tân Bình, Vĩnh Long, a commune of Bình Tân District, Vĩnh Long Province
