= Tam Điệp (disambiguation) =

Tam Điệp is a ward in Ninh Bình province, Vietnam.

Tam Điệp may also refer to:

- Tam Điệp (city), a former provincial city of Ninh Bình province, Vietnam
- Tam Điệp pass, a mountain pass between boundary of Ninh Bình province and Thanh Hóa province
