= Đông Hoa Lư =

Đông Hoa Lư Phường Đông Hoa Lư
- Ward
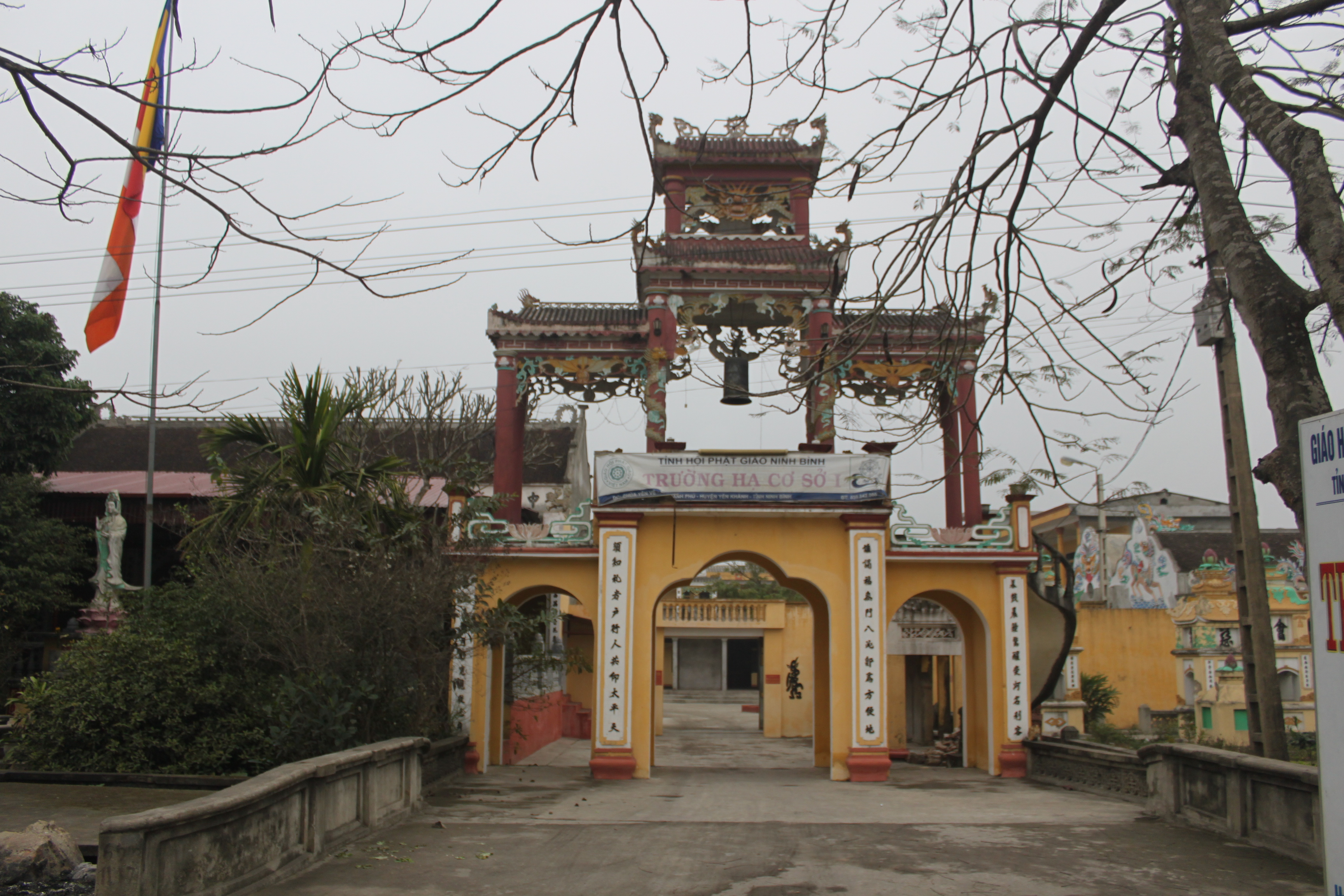
- Phúc Long Pagoda
- Interactive map of Đông Hoa Lư
- Location in Vietnam
- Country: Vietnam
- Regions: Red River Delta
- Province: Ninh Bình Province
- Established: June 16, 2025

Area
  - Total: 25.62 km^{2} (9.89 sq mi)

Population (2025)
  - Total: 34,141
  - Density: 1,333/km^{2} (3,451/sq mi)
- Time zone: UTC+07:00 (Indochina Time)

Đông Hoa Lư is a ward (phường) of Ninh Bình Province, Vietnam.

== Geography ==
Đông Hoa Lư Ward located in southern Ninh Bình Province, and adjacent to:

- Yên Đồng Commune and Ý Yên Commune to the north
- Yên Thắng Ward and Yên Mô Commune to the south
- Hoa Lư Ward and Nam Hoa Lư Ward to the west
- Yên Khánh Commune to the east.

== History ==
On June 12, 2025, the National Assembly of Vietnam issued Resolution No. 202/2025/QH15 on the arrangement of provincial-level administrative units (effective from June 12, 2025). Accordingly, the entire land area and population of Hà Nam Province, Nam Định Province and Ninh Bình Province were merged to form a new province named Ninh Bình Province.

On June 16, 2025, the Standing Committee of the National Assembly of Vietnam issued Resolution No. 1674/NQ-UBTVQH15 on the arrangement of commune-level administrative units of Ninh Bình Province in 2025 (effective from June 16, 2025). Accordingly, the entire land area and population of Ninh Phúc Ward and Khánh Hòa, Khánh Phú, Khánh An Communes were merged to form a new ward named Đông Hoa Lư Ward.
