= Tân Phú Trung =

Commune in Đồng Tháp province, Vietnam

- Commune
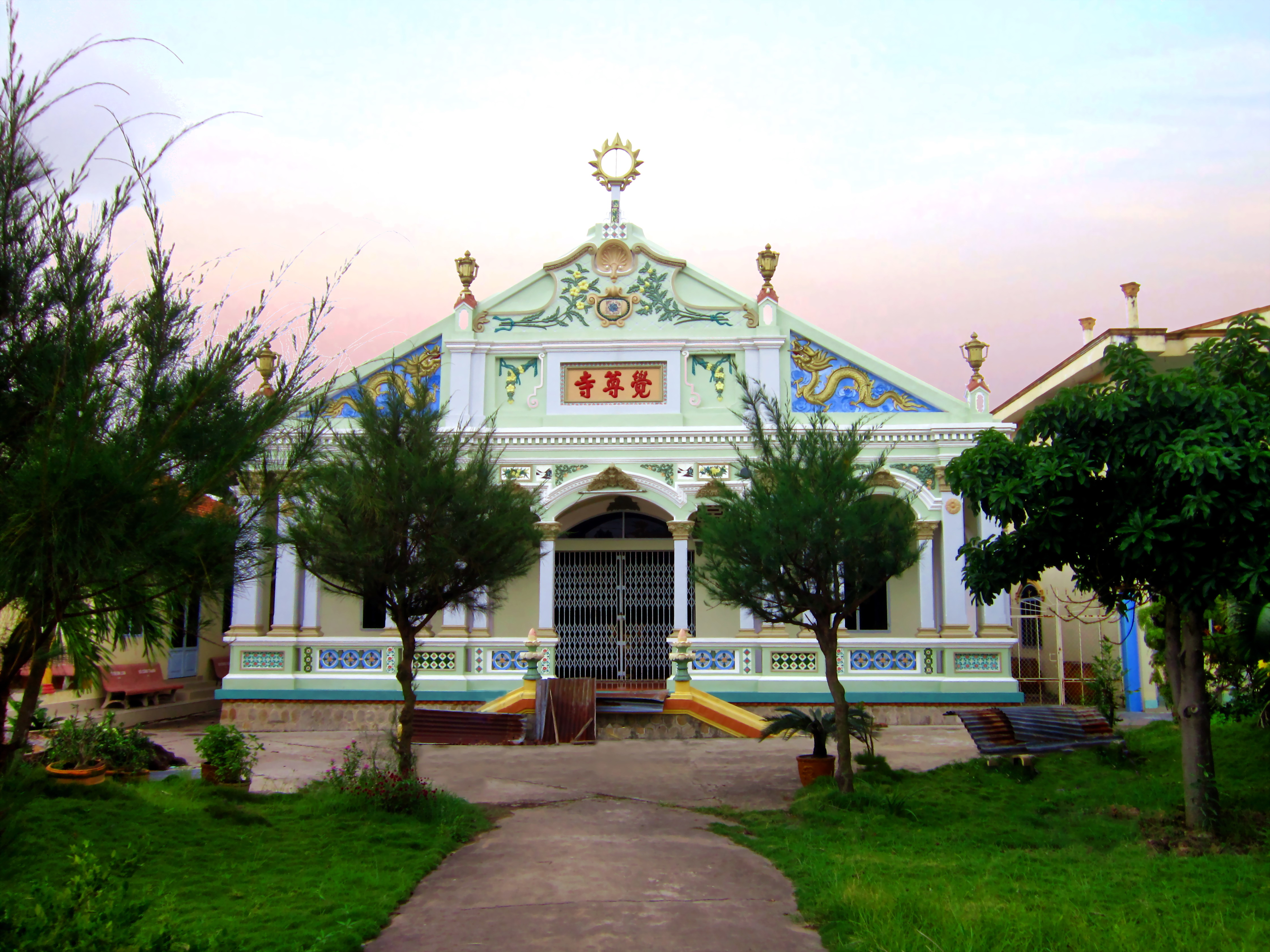
- Giác Tôn Pagoda in Tân Phú Trung commune
- Interactive map of Tân Phú Trung
- Coordinates: 10°13′50″N 105°45′49″E
- Country: Vietnam
- Region: Mekong Delta
- Province: Đồng Tháp
- Establish: June, 16, 2025

Area
  - Total: 82.6 km^{2} (31.9 sq mi)

Population (2024)
  - Total: 62,831 people
  - Density: 761/km^{2} (1,970/sq mi)
- Time zone: UTC+7
- Administrative code: 30259

Tân Phú Trung is a commune in Đồng Tháp province, Vietnam. It is one of the 102 communes and wards in the province.

== Geography ==
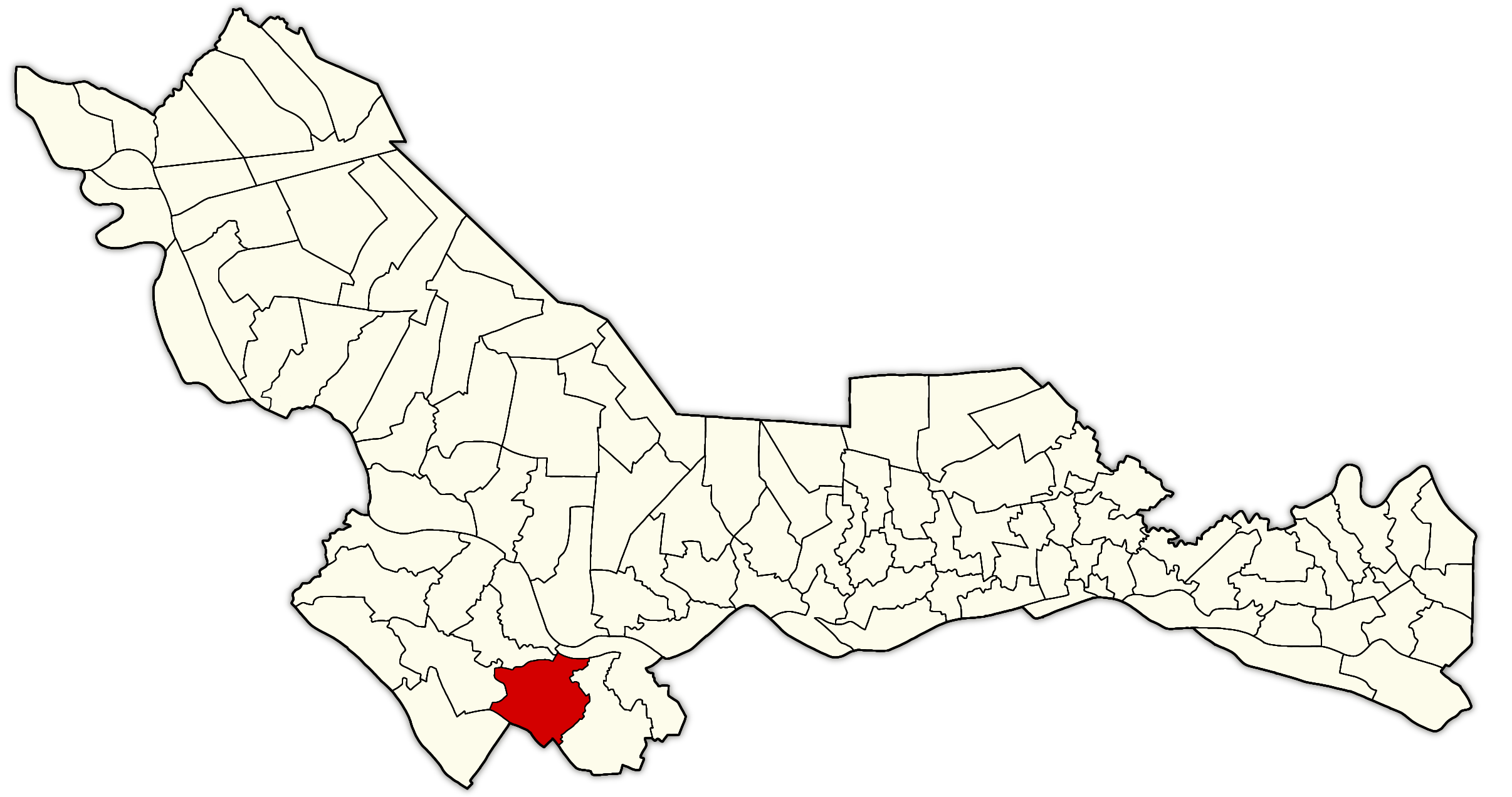
The map shows the location of Tân Phú Trung commune in Đồng Tháp province (highlighted in red).

Tân Phú Trung is a commune located in the southern part of Đồng Tháp province. Located 40km southeast of Cao Lãnh ward and approximately 90km southwest of Mỹ Tho ward, the commune has the following geographical location:

- To the east, it borders the Tân Nhuận Đông commune.
- To the north, it borders the Phú Hựu commune.
- To the northwest, it borders Sa Đéc ward and Tân Dương commune.
- To the west and southwest, it borders Hòa Long and Phong Hòa communes.
- To the south, it borders the Tân Lược commune, Vĩnh Long province.

== History ==
Prior to 1975, the area of the current commune belonged to Đức Tôn district, Sa Đéc province.

On February 24, 1976, the Provisional Revolutionary Government of the Republic of South Vietnam issued Decree No. 3/NQ/1976. Accordingly, the entire area and population of Sa Đéc province and Kiến Phong province were merged into a new province called Đồng Tháp province.

At that time, the current geographical area of the commune corresponded to the communes of Tân Bình, Tân Phú Trung, Tân Phú, and Phú Long in Châu Thành district, Đồng Tháp province.

On June 12, 2025, the National Assembly of Vietnam issued Resolution No. 202/2025/QH15 on the reorganization of provincial-level administrative units. Accordingly:

- The province of Đồng Tháp was established by merging the entire area and population of Đồng Tháp province and Tiền Giang province.

On June 16, 2025, the National Assembly of Vietnam issued Resolution No. 1663/NQ-UBTVQH15 on the reorganization of commune-level administrative units in Đồng Tháp province. Accordingly:

- The commune of Tân Phú Trung was established by merging the entire area and population of the communes of Tân Phú Trung, Tân Phú, Tân Bình, and Phú Long in Châu Thành district, Đồng Tháp province.
