= Đào Thái Hanh =

Vietnamese mandarin

- 陶泰亨
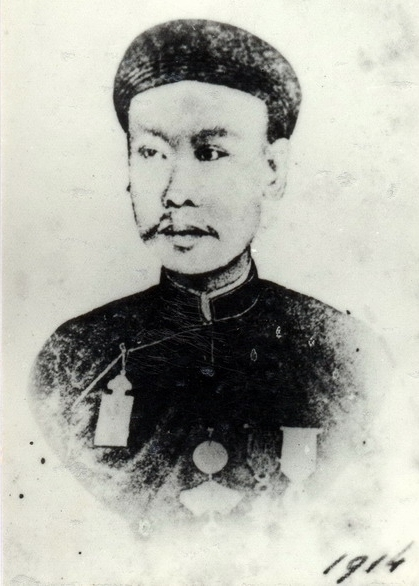

Personal details
- Born: February 24, 1871
- Died: January 6, 1916 (aged 44)

Đào Thái Hanh (Chữ Hán: 陶泰亨, February 24, 1871 – January 6, 1916), courtesy name Gia Hội (嘉會), art name Sa Giang (沙江) and Mộng Châu (夢珠), was a Vietnamese mandarin of the Nguyễn dynasty. As one of the earliest collaborators of Bulletin des Amis du Vieux Hué since its establishment in 1914, his articles for the magazine have left many valuable studies on the history and culture of Huế.

== Biography ==
Đào Thái Hanh was born to a Confucian mandarin family in An Tịch village, tổng An Hội, (Note: Tổng (總) is a local administrative unit in Vietnam before 1945, between a district and a commune.) An Xuyên district, phủ Tân Thành, (Note: Phủ (府) is a local administrative unit in ancient Vietnam.) Sa Đéc province (now part of An Hiệp commune, Châu Thành district, Đồng Tháp province). His grandfather, Đào Văn Quế, was a mandarin and was named as Hàn lâm viện thị độc (翰林院侍讀). His father Đào Văn Chung was named as Thái thường tự khanh (太常寺卿).

Hanh grew up learning Chinese characters and chữ Quốc Ngữ from her father, and later learned French when he was in the school of Sa Đéc province. A solid foundation in the Literary Chinese allowed Hanh to successfully conduct later research.

Hanh was designated, in February 1915, as Tuần vũ (巡撫, provincial governor) of Quảng Trị province, and then died in Quảng Trị on January 9, 1916, while in office.

== Works ==
As a talented classical poet, Đào Thái Hanh's poems are collected in the poetry book "Mộng châu thi tập" (夢珠詩集).

== Achievements, awards and recognition ==
- Officier d'Académie (March 20, 1910)
- Royal Order of Monisaraphon (April 15, 1912)
- Chevaliers of the Légion d'honneur (July 25, 1912)
