= Tân Nhuận Đông =

Tân Nhuận Đông Nha Mân
- Commune
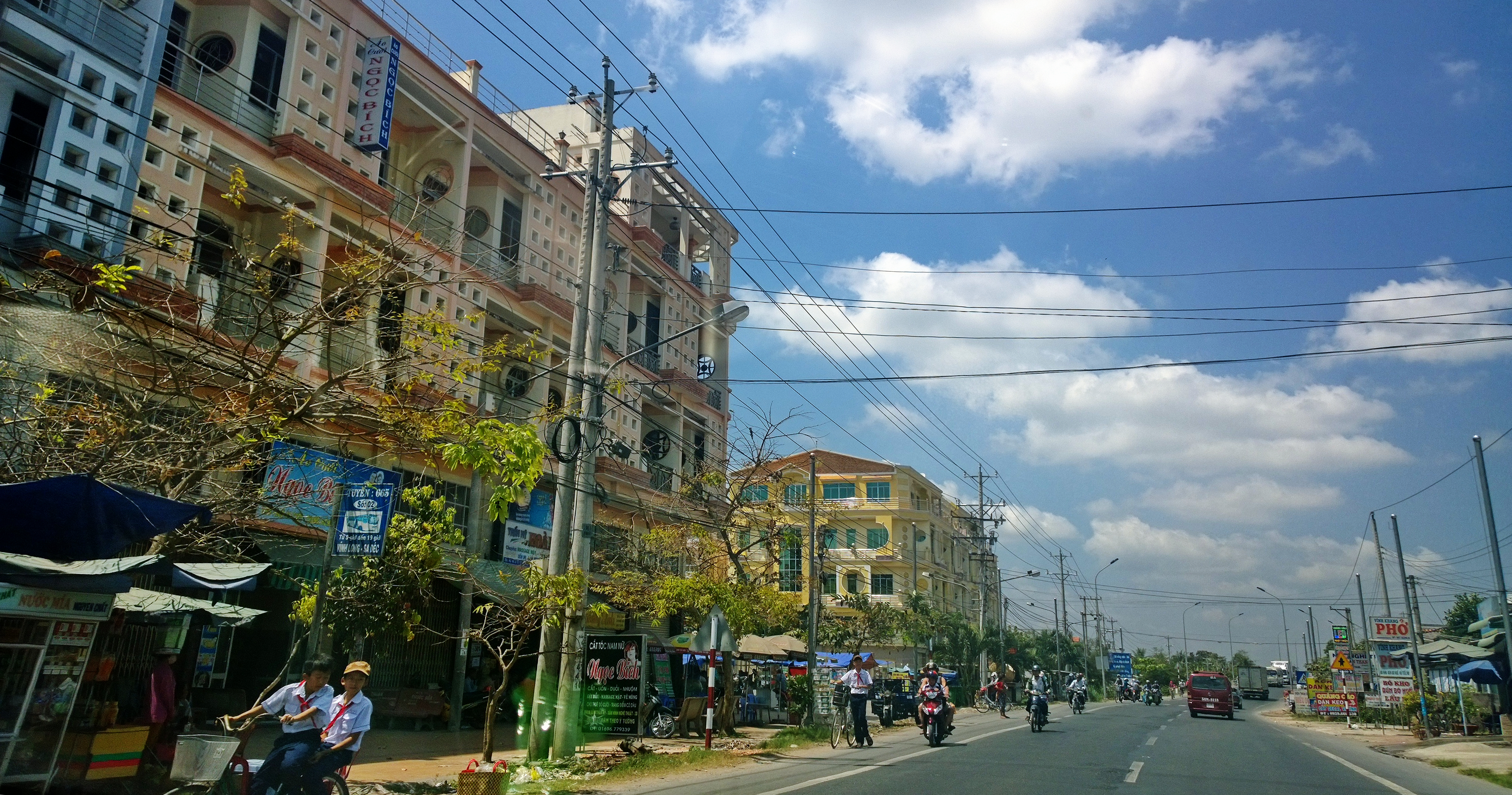
- National Highway 80 in Tân Nhuận Đông
- Interactive map of Tân Nhuận Đông
- Coordinates: 10°12′31″N 105°50′02″E
- Country: Vietnam
- Province: Đồng Tháp
- Establish: June 16, 2026

Area
  - Total: 92 km^{2} (36 sq mi)

Population (2024)
  - Total: 59,576 people
  - Density: 650/km^{2} (1,700/sq mi)

Tân Nhuận Đông is a commune in Đồng Tháp province, Vietnam. It is one of the 102 commune and wards in the province.

== Geography ==
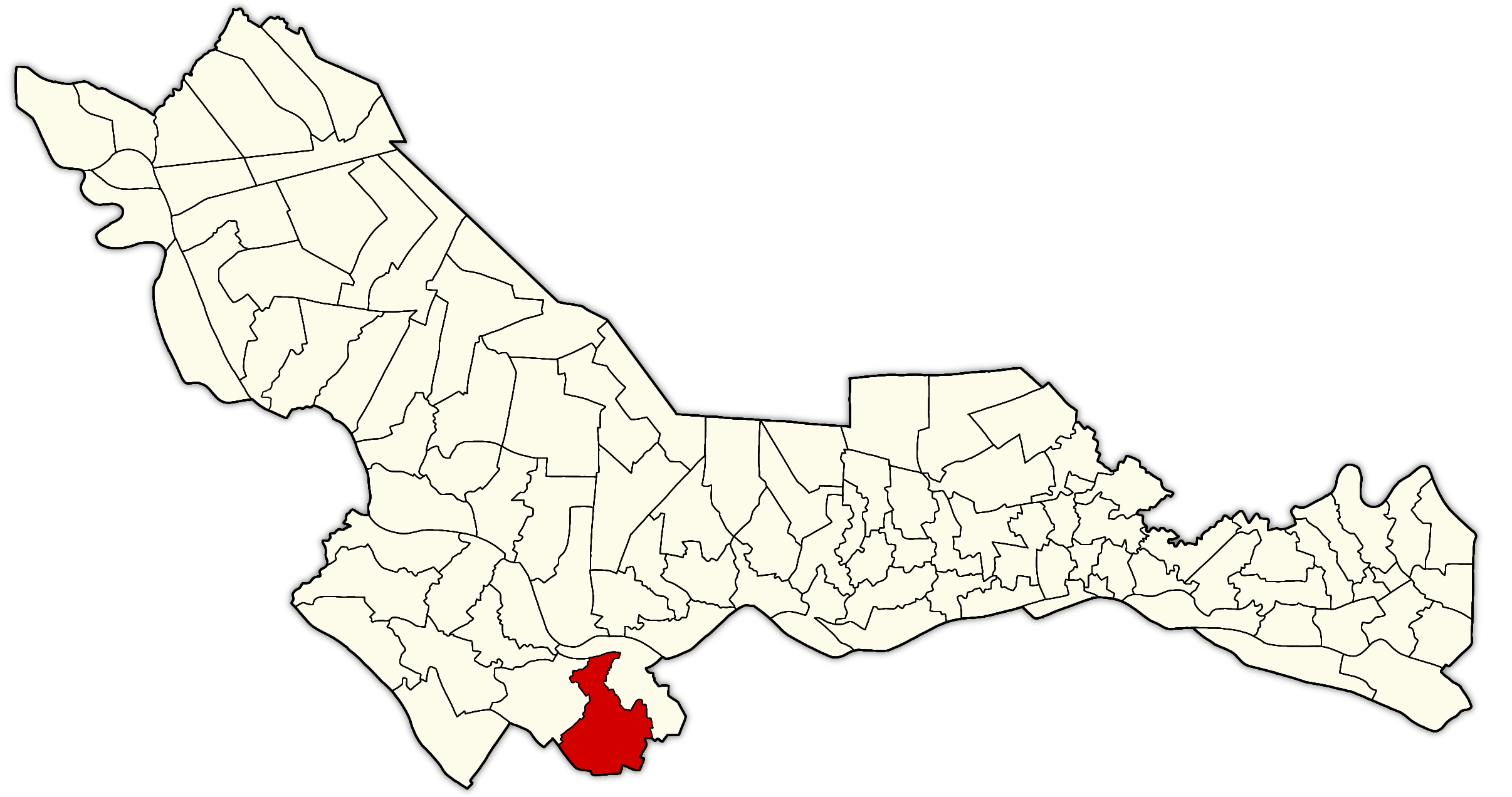
The location of Tân Nhuận Đông commune on the map of Đồng Tháp province (highlighted in red).

Tân Nhuận Đông is a commune located in the southern part of Đồng Tháp province, about 10km southeast of Sa Đéc ward, about 40km southeast of Cao Lãnh ward, and about 90km west of Mỹ Tho ward. The commune has a geographical location:

- To the north and east, it borders Phú Hựu commune.
- To the west, it borders Tân Phú Trung commune.
- To the south and southeast, it borders Vĩnh Long province.

== History ==
Prior to April 30, 1975, the commune was located in Đức Tôn district, Sa Đéc province.

At that time, the area that is now Tân Nhuận Đông commune was originally part of Hòa Tân, An Khánh, and Tân Nhuận Đông communes in Châu Thành district, Đồng Tháp province.

On June 12, 2025, the 15th National Assembly of Vietnam issued Resolution No. 202/2025/QH15 on the reorganization of provincial-level administrative units. Accordingly, the entire area and population of Tiền Giang province will be merged into Đồng Tháp province.

On June 16, 2025, the Standing Committee of the National Assembly issued Resolution No. 1663/NQ-UBTVQH15 on the rearrangement of commune-level administrative units in Đồng Tháp province in 2025. Accordingly:

- The entire area and population of the communes of An Khánh, Hoà Tân, and Tân Nhuận Đông in Châu Thành district, Đồng Tháp province, are merged into a new commune named Tân Nhuận Đông (Excerpt from Clause 37, Article 1).
