= Yên Sơn, Ninh Bình =

Yên Sơn Phường Yên Sơn
- Ward
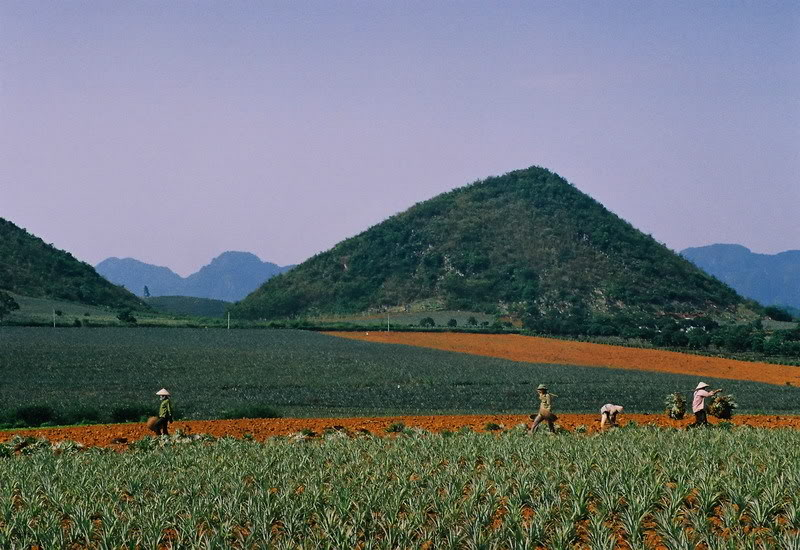
- Đồng Giao Pineapple Farm
- Interactive map of Yên Sơn
- Country: Vietnam
- Regions: Red River Delta
- Province: Ninh Bình Province
- Established: June 16, 2025

Area
  - Total: 35.86 km^{2} (13.85 sq mi)

Population (2025)
  - Total: 21,196
  - Density: 591.1/km^{2} (1,531/sq mi)
- Time zone: UTC+07:00 (Indochina Time)

Yên Sơn is a ward (phường) of Ninh Bình Province, Vietnam.

== Geography ==
Yên Sơn Ward located in southwestern Ninh Bình Province, and adjacent to:

- Nam Hoa Lư Ward, Tây Hoa Lư Ward and Quỳnh Lưu Commune to the north
- Tam Điệp Ward and Trung Sơn Ward to the south
- Phú Long Commune to the west
- Yên Thắng Ward to the east.

== History ==
On June 12, 2025, the National Assembly of Vietnam issued Resolution No. 202/2025/QH15 on the arrangement of provincial-level administrative units (effective from June 12, 2025). Accordingly, the entire land area and population of Hà Nam Province, Nam Định Province and Ninh Bình Province were merged to form a new province named Ninh Bình Province.

On June 16, 2025, the Standing Committee of the National Assembly of Vietnam issued Resolution No. 1674/NQ-UBTVQH15 on the arrangement of commune-level administrative units of Ninh Bình Province in 2025 (effective from June 16, 2025). Accordingly, the entire land area and population of Tân Bình Ward, Quảng Lạc Commune and Yên Sơn Commune were merged to form a new ward named Yên Sơn Ward.
