= Nem chua Lai Vung =

Vietnamese fermented pork roll

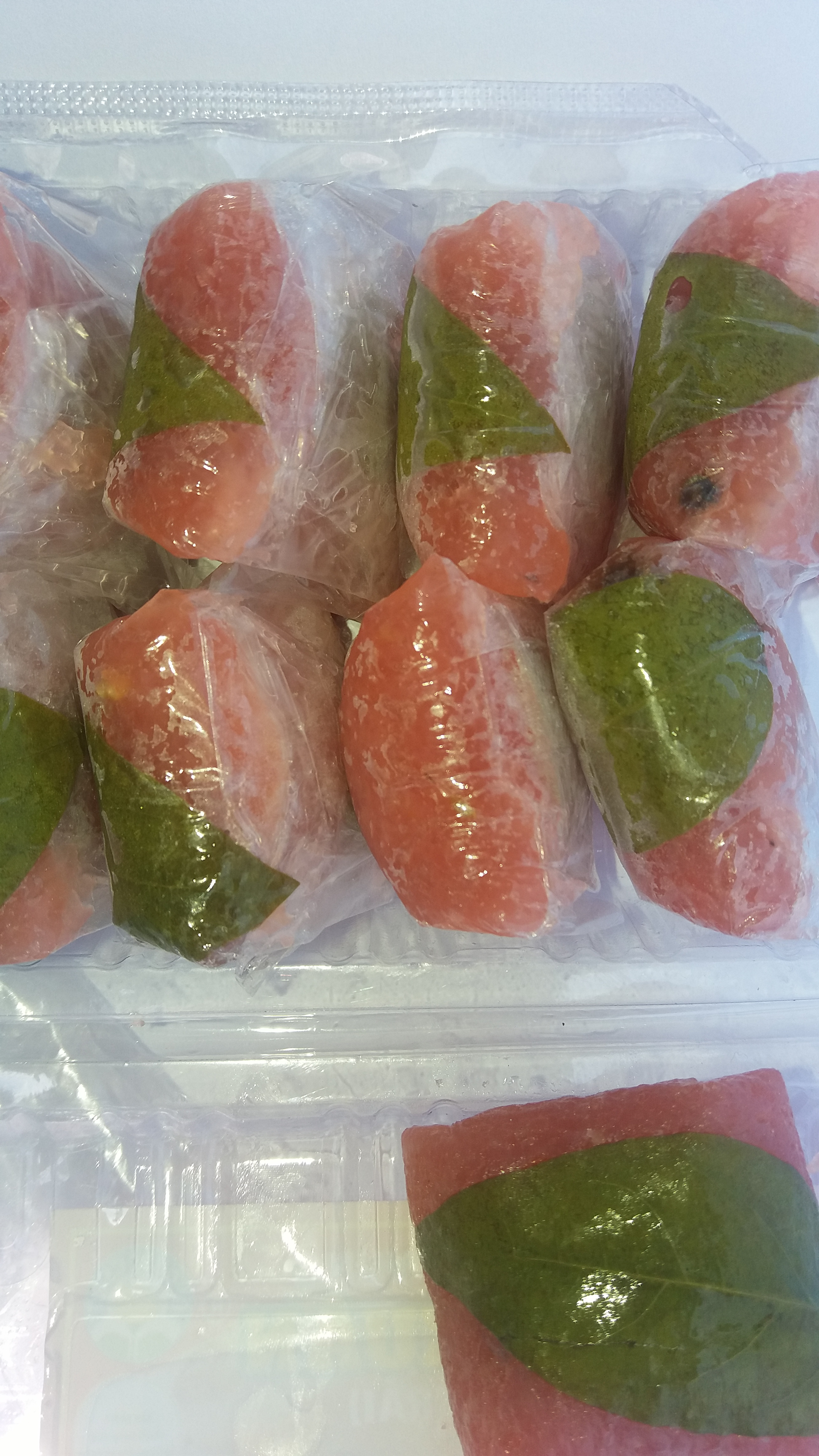
- Type: Fermented sausage
- Place of origin: Vietnam
- Region or state: Đồng Tháp Province
- Serving temperature: Cold
- Main ingredients: Pork, pork rind, rice, garlic, pepper

Nem chua Lai Vung is a fermented pork roll originating from Lai Vung in Đồng Tháp Province, Vietnam. It is characterized by its distinctive sour, spicy, salty, and sweet flavors, achieved through natural fermentation without heat treatment.

== History ==
The production of nem chua in Lai Vung originated before 1975 in Tân Khánh hamlet, Tân Thành commune, Sa Dec province pioneered by Nguyễn Thị Mặn, known locally as Tư Mặn. Initially crafted for ancestral offerings, Tet holidays, and gifts to relatives, the technique spread among locals and evolved into a commercial product sold at markets, bus stations, and eventually other provinces.

== Production ==
Nem chua Lai Vung is handmade using fresh lean pork from the hind leg or rump, cleaned of tendons and fat, soaked in salted water, drained, and ground or sliced. Pork rind is boiled, drained, and minced, then mixed with the meat in an 8:2 ratio (meat to rind), along with thính (roasted rice powder). The mixture is seasoned with salt, sugar, pepper, monosodium glutamate, garlic, and black peppercorns, then marinated for about two days.

The seasoned mixture is wrapped in vông leaves (or substitutes like chùm ruột leaves due to scarcity), enclosed in banana leaves, and tied with strings. Fermentation begins after one day and completes by the third day, resulting in a pink-red color and balanced flavors. Since 1995, some producers have used plastic packaging while retaining traditional elements.

There are over 20 production facilities in Lai Vung, including brands like Giáo Thơ, Út Thắng, Thanh Xuân, Ba Liêm, Cô Hoàn, and Hoàng Khánh, primarily in Tân Thành and Long Hậu communes. Production increases during Tet, with facilities like Cô Hoàn doubling output to meet demand.

== Consumption ==
It is consumed directly or paired with dishes such as bún (rice vermicelli), bánh mì (Vietnamese bread), or grilled over charcoal with chili sauce. The product is a popular souvenir, often sold along National Highway 80.
