= Tây Hoa Lư =

Tây Hoa Lư Phường Tây Hoa Lư
- Ward
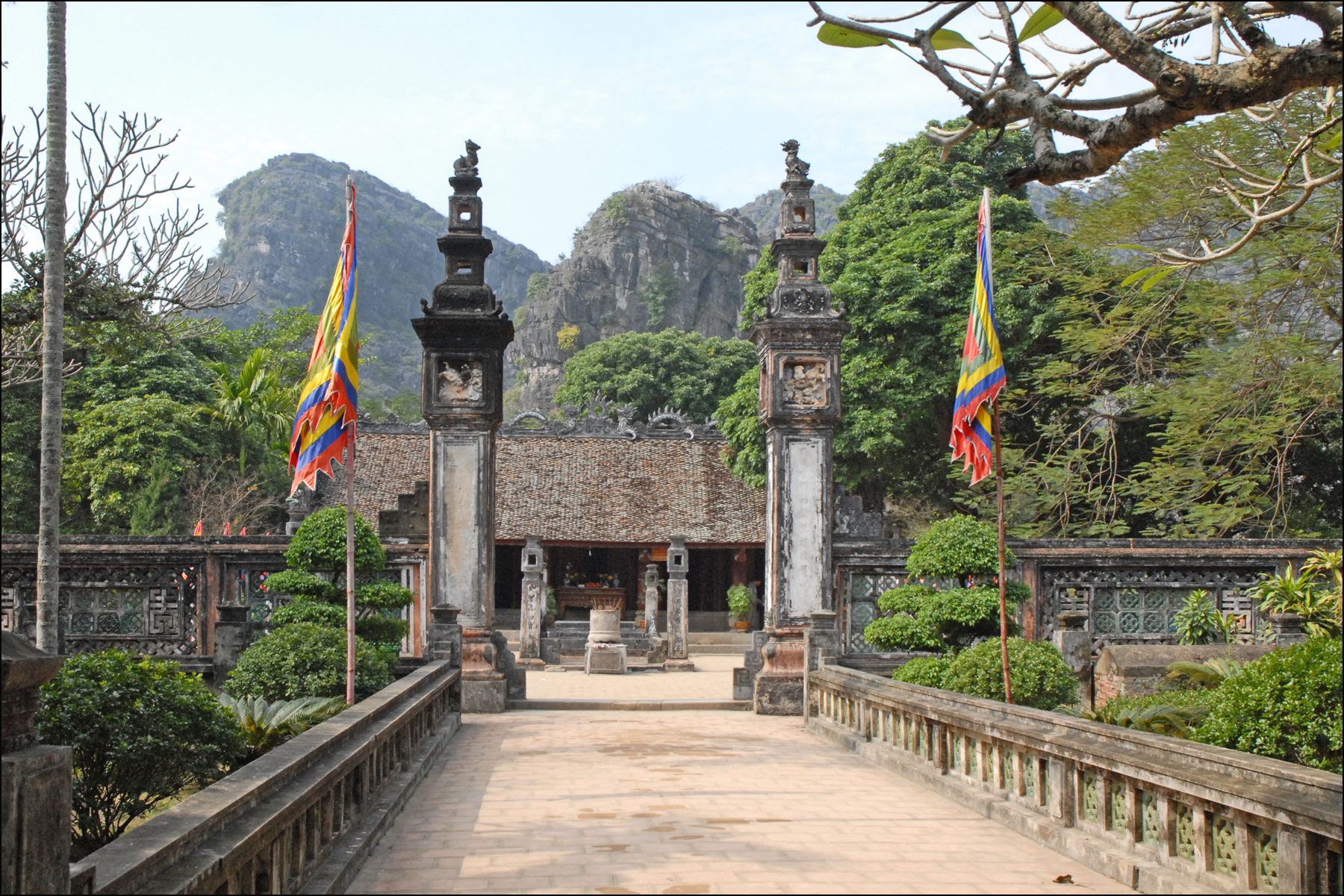
- View of Đinh Tiên Hoàng Temple
- Interactive map of Tây Hoa Lư
- Country: Vietnam
- Regions: Red River Delta
- Province: Ninh Bình Province
- Established: June 16, 2025

Area
  - Total: 84.96 km^{2} (32.80 sq mi)

Population (2025)
  - Total: 46,648
  - Density: 549.1/km^{2} (1,422/sq mi)
- Time zone: UTC+07:00 (Indochina Time)

Tây Hoa Lư is a ward (phường) of Ninh Bình Province, Vietnam.

== Geography ==
Tây Hoa Lư Ward located in southwestern Ninh Bình Province, and adjacent to:

- Đại Hoàng Commune, Gia Phong Commune, Gia Trấn Commune, Gia Vân Commune, Phong Doanh Commune, and Ý Yên Commune to the north
- Yên Sơn Ward to the south
- Thanh Sơn Commune and Quỳnh Lưu Commune to the west
- Hoa Lư Ward and Nam Hoa Lư Ward to the east.

== History ==
On June 12, 2025, the National Assembly of Vietnam issued Resolution No. 202/2025/QH15 on the arrangement of provincial-level administrative units (effective from June 12, 2025). Accordingly, the entire land area and population of Hà Nam Province, Nam Định Province and Ninh Bình Province were merged to form a new province named Ninh Bình Province.

On June 16, 2025, the Standing Committee of the National Assembly of Vietnam issued Resolution No. 1674/NQ-UBTVQH15 on the arrangement of commune-level administrative units of Ninh Bình Province in 2025 (effective from June 16, 2025). Accordingly, the entire land area and population of Ninh Giang Ward, Trường Yên, Ninh Hòa, Phúc Sơn, Gia Sinh Communes, and the remaining part of Gia Tân Commune after being arranged were merged to form a new ward named Tây Hoa Lư Ward.
