= Tân Lược =

- Commune
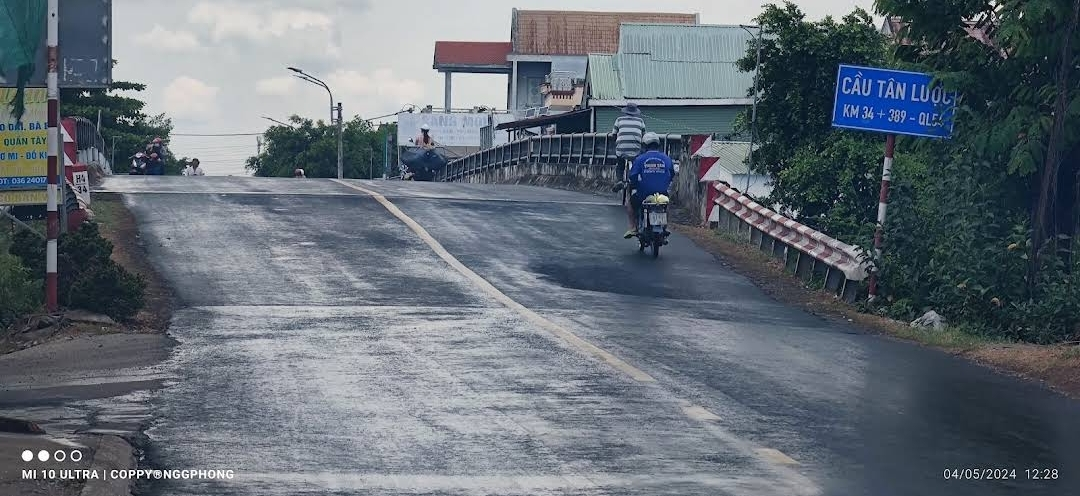
- Tân Lược bridge is located on National route 54, in the section passing through Tân Lược commune.
- Interactive map of Tân Lược
- Country: Vietnam
- Province: Vĩnh Long
- Establish: June 16, 2025
- People's Committee: Tân Vĩnh hamlet

Area
  - Total: 56.39 km^{2} (21.77 sq mi)

Population 2025
  - Total: 38,844 people
  - Density: 688.8/km^{2} (1,784/sq mi)

Tân Lược is a commune in Vĩnh Long province, Vietnam. It is one of 124 communes and wards in the province following the 2025 reorganization.

== Geography ==
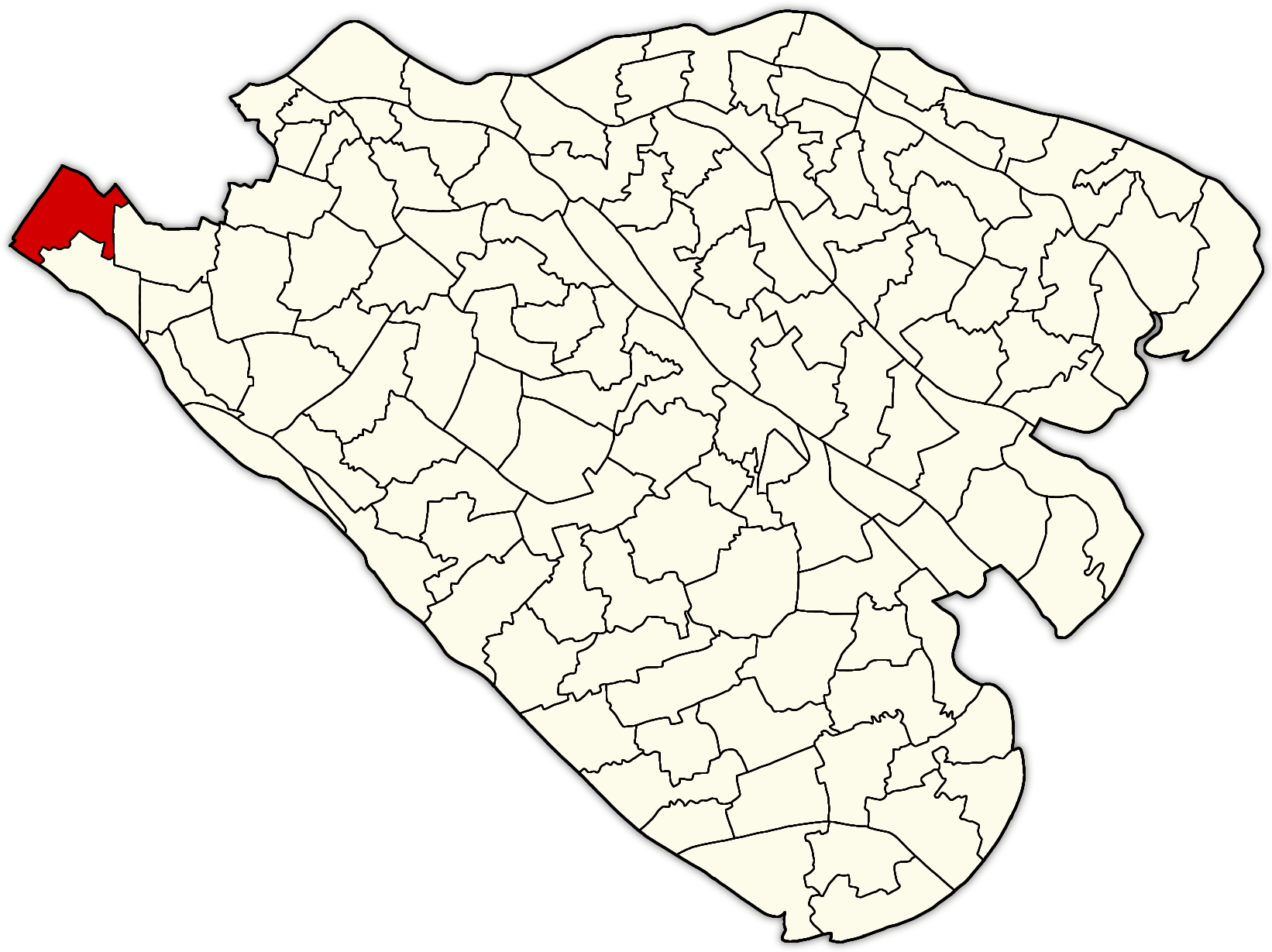
Location of Tân Lược commune on Vĩnh Long province map (highlight in red).

Tân Lược is a commune located in the westernmost part of Vĩnh Long province. The commune has the following geographical location:

- To the northwest and north, it borders Đồng Tháp province.
- To the west, it borders Cần Thơ municipality.
- To the south, it borders Tân Quới commune.
- To the east, it borders Mỹ Thuận commune.

== History ==
Prior to 2025, Tân Lược commune consisted of Tân Lược, Tân Thành, and Tân An Thạnh communes in Bình Tân district, Vĩnh Long province.

On June 12, 2025, the National Assembly of Vietnam issued Resolution No. 202/2025/QH15 on the reorganization of provincial-level administrative units. Accordingly:

- Vĩnh Long province was established by merging the entire area and population of Bến Tre province, Vĩnh Long province and Trà Vinh province.

On June 16, 2025, the Standing Committee of the National Assembly of Vietnam issued Resolution No. 1684/NQ-UBTVQH15 on the reorganization of commune-level administrative units in Vĩnh Long province. Accordingly:

- Tân Lược commune was established by merging the entire area and population of the former communes of Tân Lược, Tân Thành, and Tân An Thạnh (formerly part of Bình Tân district).
