= Đinh Tiên Hoàng Temple =

- Đền thờ Vua Đinh Tiên Hoàng (Vietnamese)
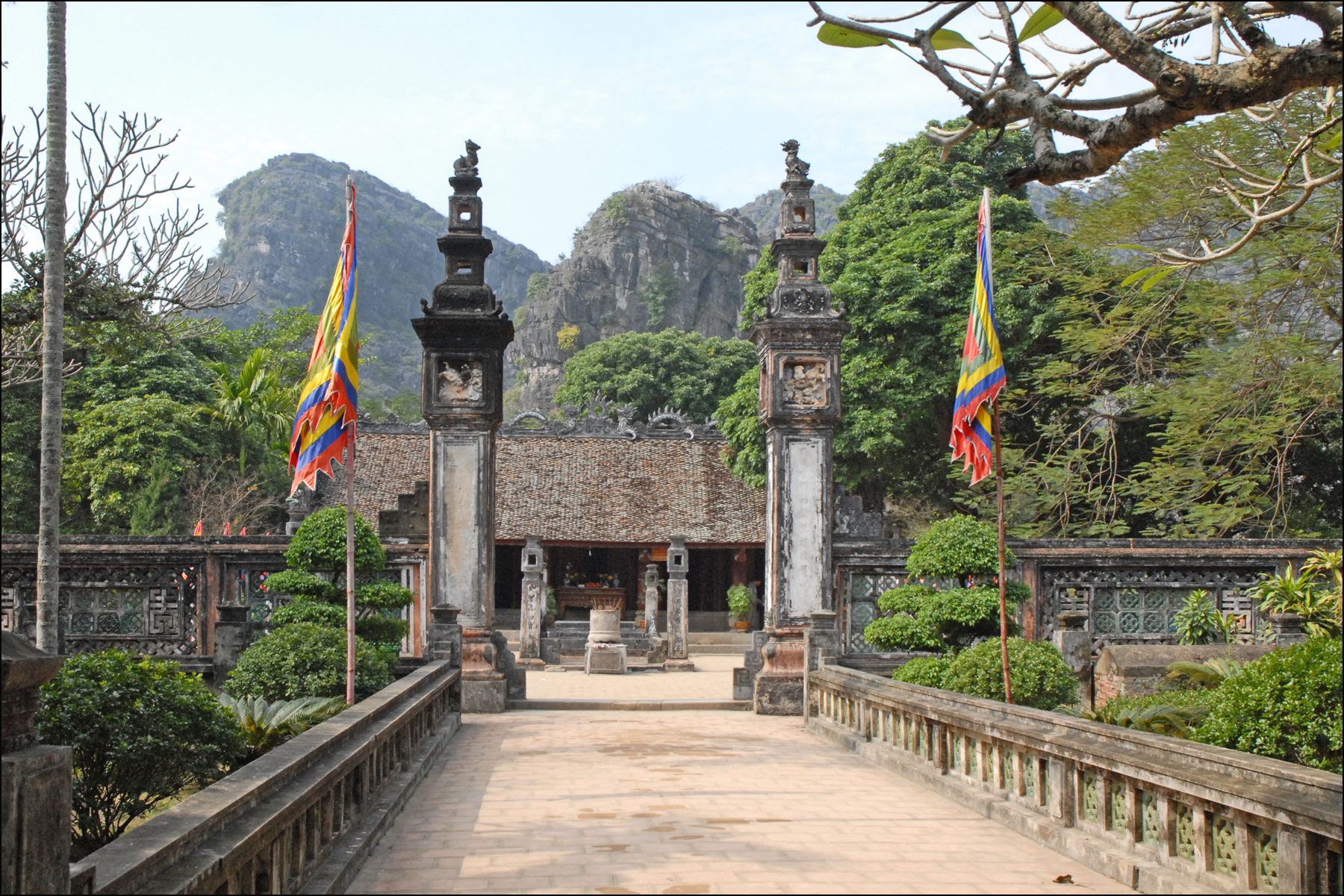
- View of Đinh Tiên Hoàng Temple from the temple entrance
- Interactive map of Đinh Tiên Hoàng Temple
- 20°15′16″N 105°55′11″E
- Location: Tây Hoa Lư, Ninh Bình, Vietnam

History
- Built: 17th century

Đinh Tiên Hoàng Temple (Vietnamese: Đền thờ Vua Đinh Tiên Hoàng) is a historic temple located in Tây Hoa Lư ward, Ninh Bình province, Vietnam. It is dedicated to Emperor Đinh Tiên Hoàng (also known as Đinh Bộ Lĩnh), the founder of the Đinh dynasty, along with his parents, sons, and key generals. The temple is part of the ancient capital of Hoa Lư and is included in the Tràng An Scenic Landscape Complex, a UNESCO World Heritage Site recognized in 2014.

== History ==
The temple was constructed in the 17th century on the site of the ancient Hoa Lư palace. Archaeological excavations have revealed bricks from the Đinh and Early Lê periods, inscribed with phrases such as "Đại Việt Quốc quân thành chuyên" and "Giang tây quân." The site is central to the eastern citadel of the ancient capital Hoa Lư. It is the only temple in Vietnam that worships Emperor Đinh Tiên Hoàng, his parents, his sons (Đinh Liễn, Đinh Hạng Lang, and Đinh Toàn), and the four key generals of the Đinh court: Nguyễn Bặc, Đinh Điền, Trịnh Tú, and Lưu Cơ. In 2014, as part of the Hoa Lư ancient capital relics, the temple was incorporated into the Tràng An UNESCO World Heritage Site.

== Architecture ==
The temple follows the "nội công ngoại quốc" architectural style, with its main axis oriented eastward. It features a crescent-shaped lake, a screen wall with a sun motif, an outer ceremonial gate (Ngọ môn quan) with tiled roofs and lion-like creatures, and an inner gate (Nghi môn) made of lim wood. The dragon courtyard includes two stone dragon platforms (long sàng), recognized as national treasures in 2017. These platforms are carved with dragons, clouds, and other motifs, flanked by stone nghê guardians from the 17th century. The worship hall (Bái đường) is a five-bay structure, and the main shrine (Chính cung) houses a bronze statue of Emperor Đinh Tiên Hoàng on a green stone pedestal, flanked by statues of his sons and altars for the generals. The architecture incorporates 17th-century Vietnamese folk wood carvings and preserves artifacts like inscribed bricks and steles.

== Cultural significance ==
The temple holds unique cultural value as it represents the fusion of folk and scholarly traditions in Vietnamese history. It preserves historical steles that document contributions from various families and officials across dynasties. The site symbolizes the aquatic and agricultural aspects of Vietnamese culture, with dragon motifs adapted to the local environment.

== Festivals ==
The temple is a focal point during the annual Hoa Lư Festival, which includes processions carrying palanquins and incense from surrounding temples. These events commemorate the Đinh dynasty and draw thousands of participants and tourists.
