= Phong Hòa =

Commune in Đồng Tháp province, Vietnam

- Commune
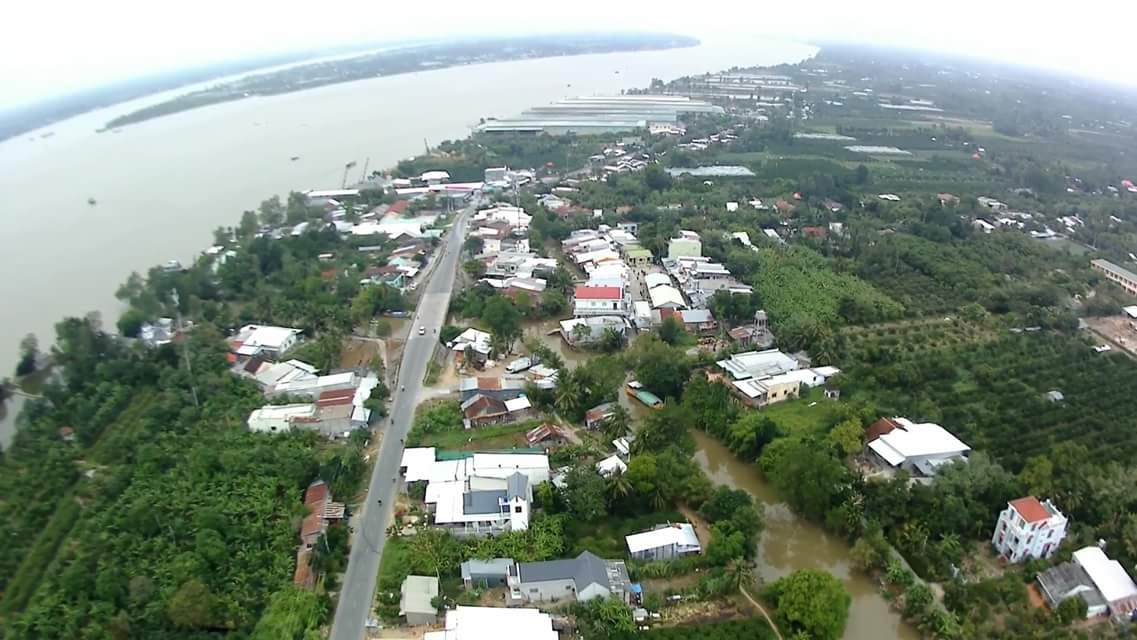
- Cái Dứa Market in Phong Hòa commune, viewed from above.
- Interactive map of Phong Hòa
- Coordinates: 10°11′29″N 105°37′52″E
- Country: Vietnam
- Region: Mekong Delta
- Province: Đồng Tháp
- Established: 16 June, 2026

Area
  - Total: 88 km^{2} (34 sq mi)

Population
  - Total: 71,537 people
  - Density: 810/km^{2} (2,100/sq mi)
- Administrative code: 30235

Phong Hòa is a commune in Đồng Tháp province, Vietnam. It is one of 102 communes and wards in the province after the merger in 2025.

== Geography ==
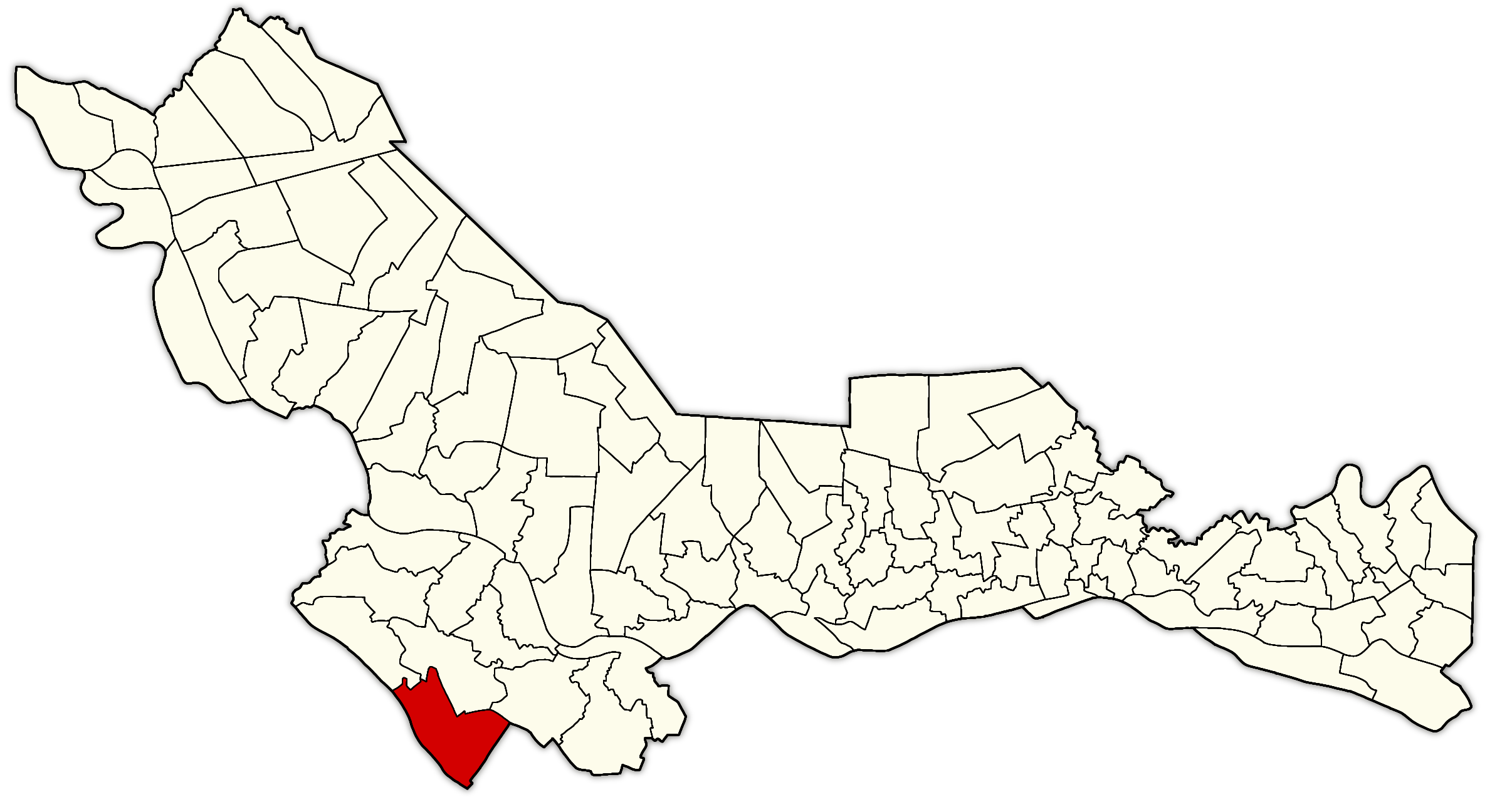
The map shows the location of Phong Hòa commune, Đồng Tháp province (highlighted in red).

Phong Hòa is a commune located on the banks of the Hậu river, in the southernmost of Đồng Tháp province. It is 115km southwest of Mỹ Tho ward, 45km south of Cao Lãnh ward, and 15km south of Sa Đéc ward. The commune has the following geographical location:

- To the north, it borders the communes of Lai Vung and Hòa Long.
- To the northeast, it borders Tân Phú Trung commune.
- To the east, it borders Vĩnh Long province.
- To the west, it borders Cần Thơ city.

== Administration ==
Phong Hòa is divided into 25 hamlets: Định Mỹ, Định Phong, Định Phú, Định Tân, Định Thành, Hòa Bình, Hòa Định 1, Hòa Định 2, Hòa Khánh, Hòa Tân, Tân An, Tân Bình, Tân Hưng, Tân Lợi, Tân Mỹ, Tân Phong, Tân Phú, Tân Quới, Tân Thạnh, Tân Thới, Tân Thuận 1, Tân Thuận 2, Thới Hòa, Thới Mỹ 1, Thới Mỹ 2.

== History ==
From 1989 to 2025, the communes of Tân Hòa, Định Hòa, Vĩnh Thới, and Phong Hòa belonged to Lai Vung district, Đồng Tháp province.

On June 12, 2025, the National Assembly of Vietnam issued Resolution No. 202/2025/QH15 on the reorganization of provincial-level administrative units. Accordingly:

- The Đồng Tháp province was established by merging the entire area and population of Đồng Tháp province and Tiền Giang province.

On June 16, 2025, the Standing Committee of the National Assembly issued Resolution No. 1663/NQ-UBTVQH15 on the rearrangement of commune-level administrative units in Đồng Tháp province in 2025. Accordingly:

- The commune of Phong Hòa is established based on the entire area and population of the communes of Phong Hòa, Định Hòa, Tân Hòa, and Vĩnh Thới belonging to the former Lai Vung district (excerpt from Clause 34, Article 1).
