= Trung Sơn =

Trung Sơn Phường Trung Sơn
- Ward
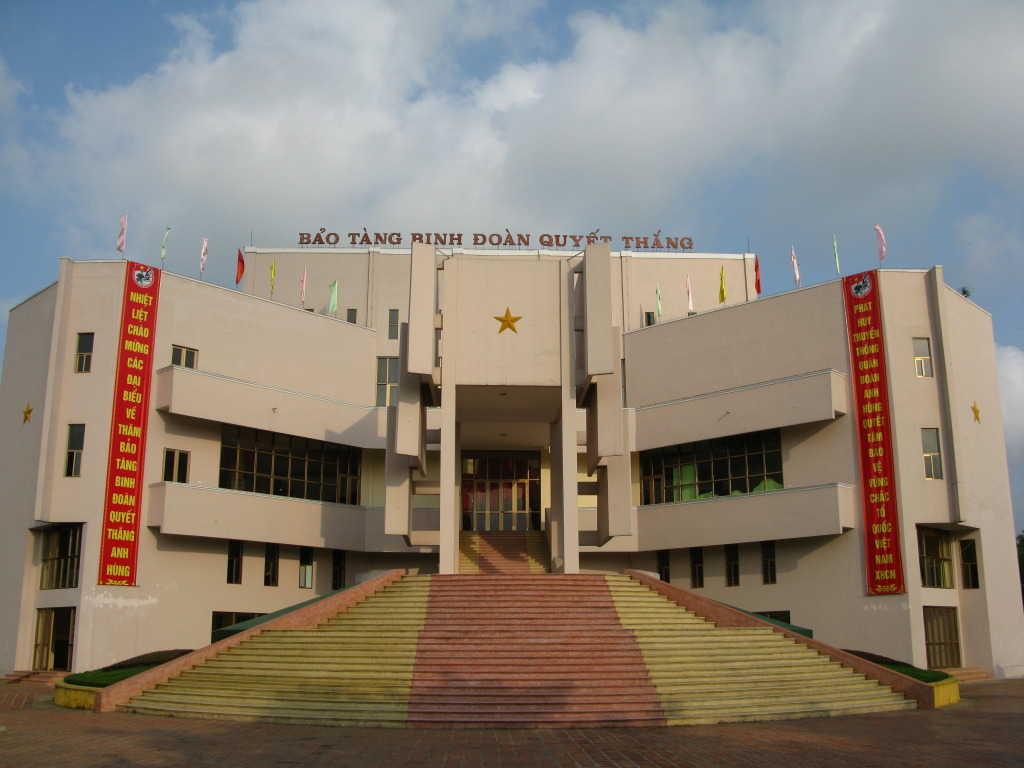
- Quyết Thắng Army Corps Museum
- Interactive map of Trung Sơn
- Location in Vietnam
- Country: Vietnam
- Regions: Red River Delta
- Province: Ninh Bình Province
- Established: June 16, 2025

Area
  - Total: 38.15 km^{2} (14.73 sq mi)

Population (2025)
  - Total: 31,539
  - Density: 826.7/km^{2} (2,141/sq mi)
- Time zone: UTC+07:00 (Indochina Time)

Trung Sơn is a ward (phường) of Ninh Bình Province, Vietnam.

== Geography ==
Trung Sơn Ward located in southern Ninh Bình Province, and adjacent to:

- Yên Sơn Ward to the north
- Thanh Hóa Province to the south
- Đồng Thái Commune to the west
- Tam Điệp Ward to the east.

== History ==
On June 12, 2025, the National Assembly of Vietnam issued Resolution No. 202/2025/QH15 on the arrangement of provincial-level administrative units (effective from June 12, 2025). Accordingly, the entire land area and population of Hà Nam Province, Nam Định Province and Ninh Bình Province were merged to form a new province named Ninh Bình Province.

On June 16, 2025, the Standing Committee of the National Assembly of Vietnam issued Resolution No. 1674/NQ-UBTVQH15 on the arrangement of commune-level administrative units of Ninh Bình Province in 2025 (effective from June 16, 2025). Accordingly, the entire land area and population of Nam Sơn Ward, Trung Sơn Ward and Đông Sơn Commune were merged to form a new ward named Trung Sơn Ward.
