= Phú Hựu =

Commune in Đồng Tháp province, Vietnam

- Commune
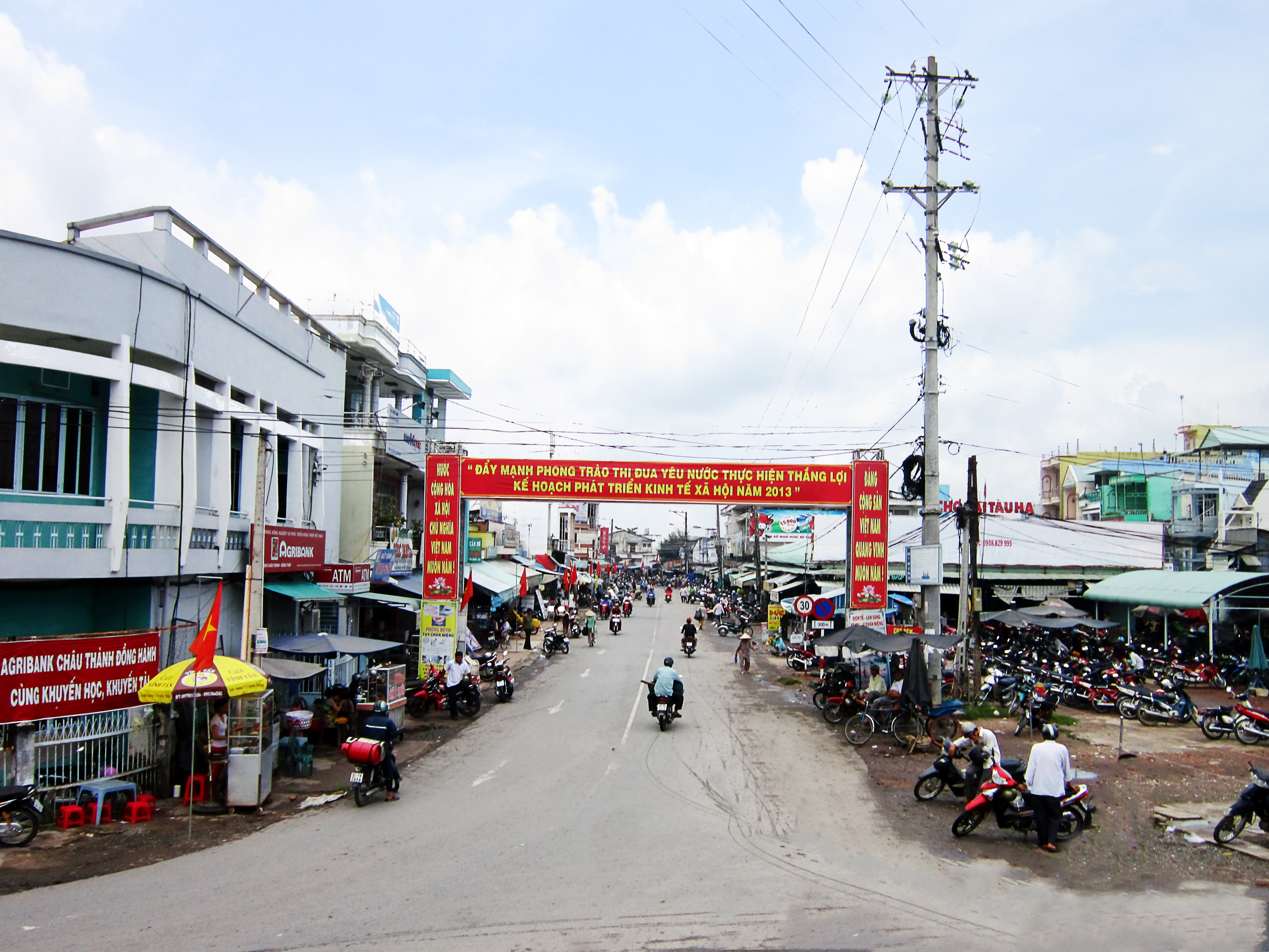
- Interactive map of Phú Hựu
- Coordinates: 10°15′34″N 105°52′15″E
- Country: Vietnam
- Province: Đồng Tháp
- Establish: June 16, 2025

Area
  - Total: 27.52 sq mi (71.28 km^{2})

Population (2025)
  - Total: 68,475 people
- Time zone: UTC+7 (UTC + 7)

Phú Hựu is a commune in Đồng Tháp province, Vietnam. This is one of 102 communes and wards in the province after the 2025 reorganization.

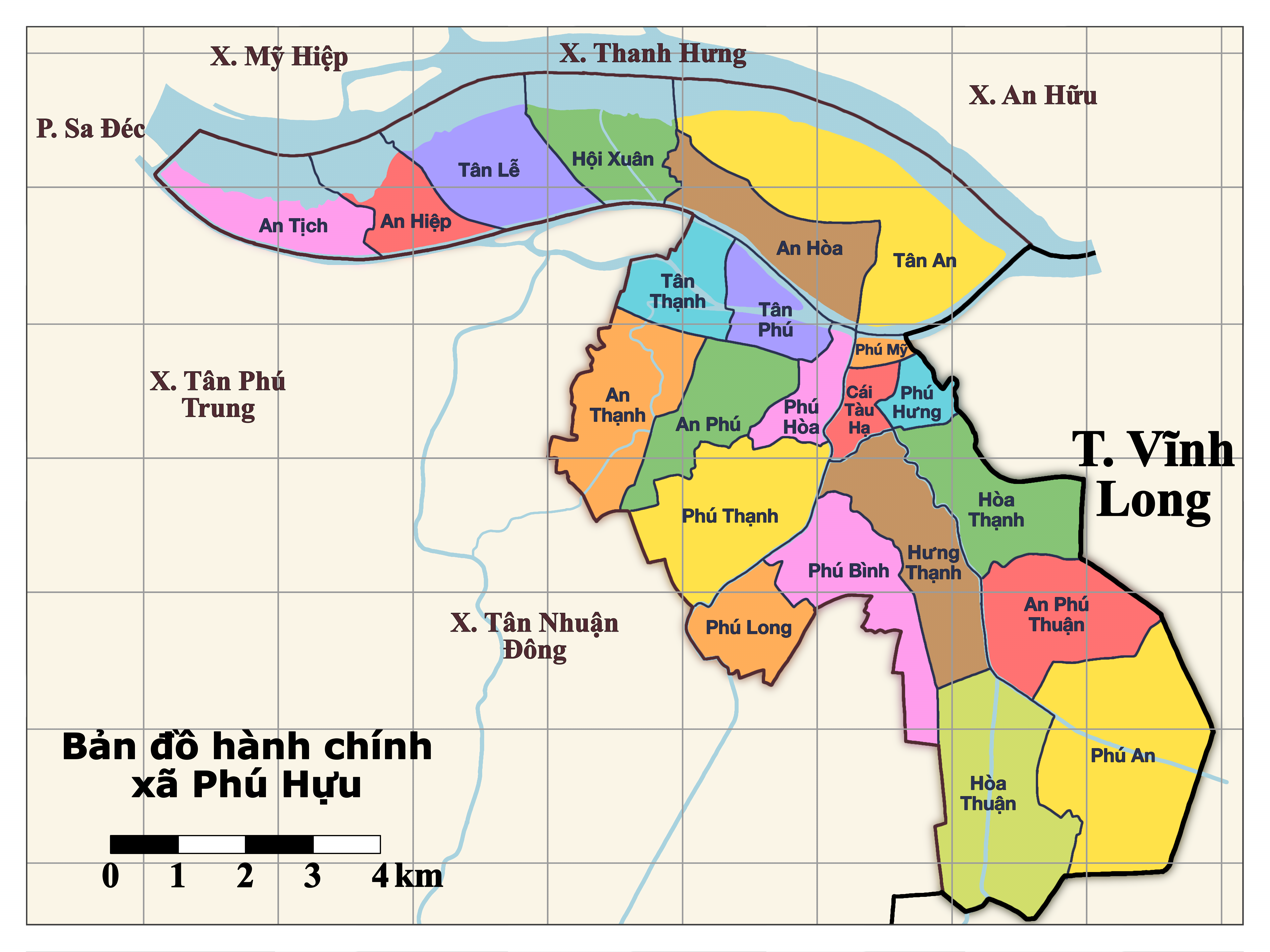
Administrative map of Phú Hựu commune, Đồng Tháp province.

== History ==
Prior to 2025, Phú Hựu commune was formerly Cái Tàu Hạ commune-level town and Phú Hựu commune, An Phú Thuận commune, An Nhơn commune, and An Hiệp commune in Châu Thành district, Đồng Tháp province.

On June 12, 2025, the National Assembly of Vietnam issued Resolution No. 202/2025/QH15 on the reorganization of provincial-level administrative units. Accordingly:

- Đồng Tháp province was established by merging the entire area and population of Đồng Tháp province and Tiền Giang province.

On June 16, 2025, the Standing Committee of the National Assembly of Vietnam issued Resolution No. 1663/NQ-UBTVQH15 on the reorganization of commune-level administrative units under Đồng Tháp province, accordingly:

- Arrange the total area and population size of Cái Tàu Hạ commune-level town, Phú Hựu, An Phú Thuận, An Hiệp, An Nhơn communes belonging to the Châu Thành district, Đồng Tháp province to become a new commune named Phú Hựu commune.

== Geography ==
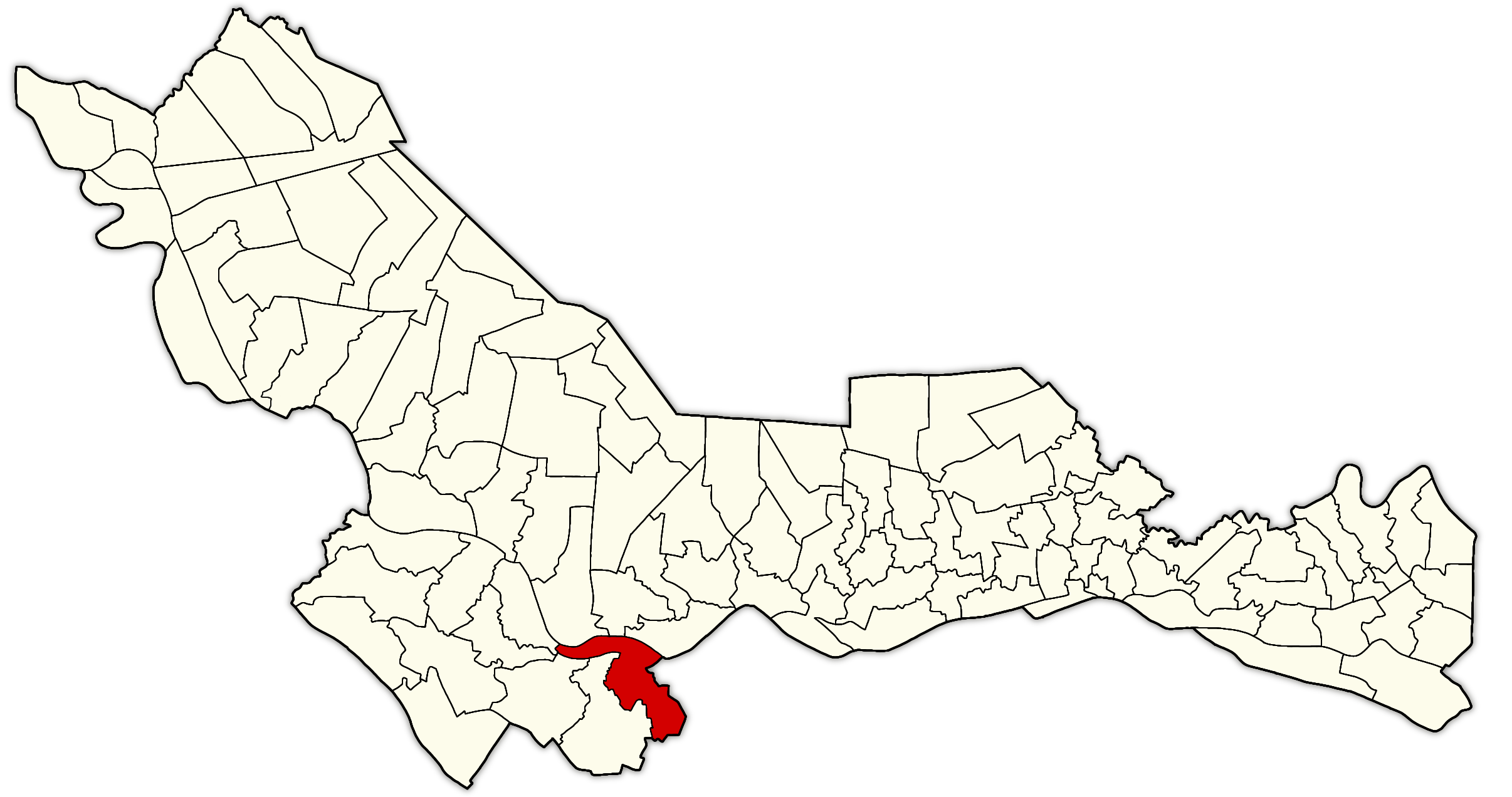
Location of Phú Hựu commune on the map of Đồng Tháp province (highlighted in red)

Phú Hựu is a commune located in the southern part of Đồng Tháp province, approximately 45km southeast of Cao Lãnh ward and 85km west of Mỹ Tho ward.

- To the north, it borders the communes An Hữu, Mỹ Hiệp and Thanh Hưng, across the Tiền River.
- To the west-southwest, it borders Sa Đéc ward and Tân Nhuận Đông, Tân Phú Trung communes.
- To the southeast, it borders Tân Ngãi and Tân Hạnh wards belonging to Vĩnh Long province.
- To the southeast, it borders Phú Quới commune of Vĩnh Long province.
