= Nam Hoa Lư =

Nam Hoa Lư Phường Nam Hoa Lư
- Ward
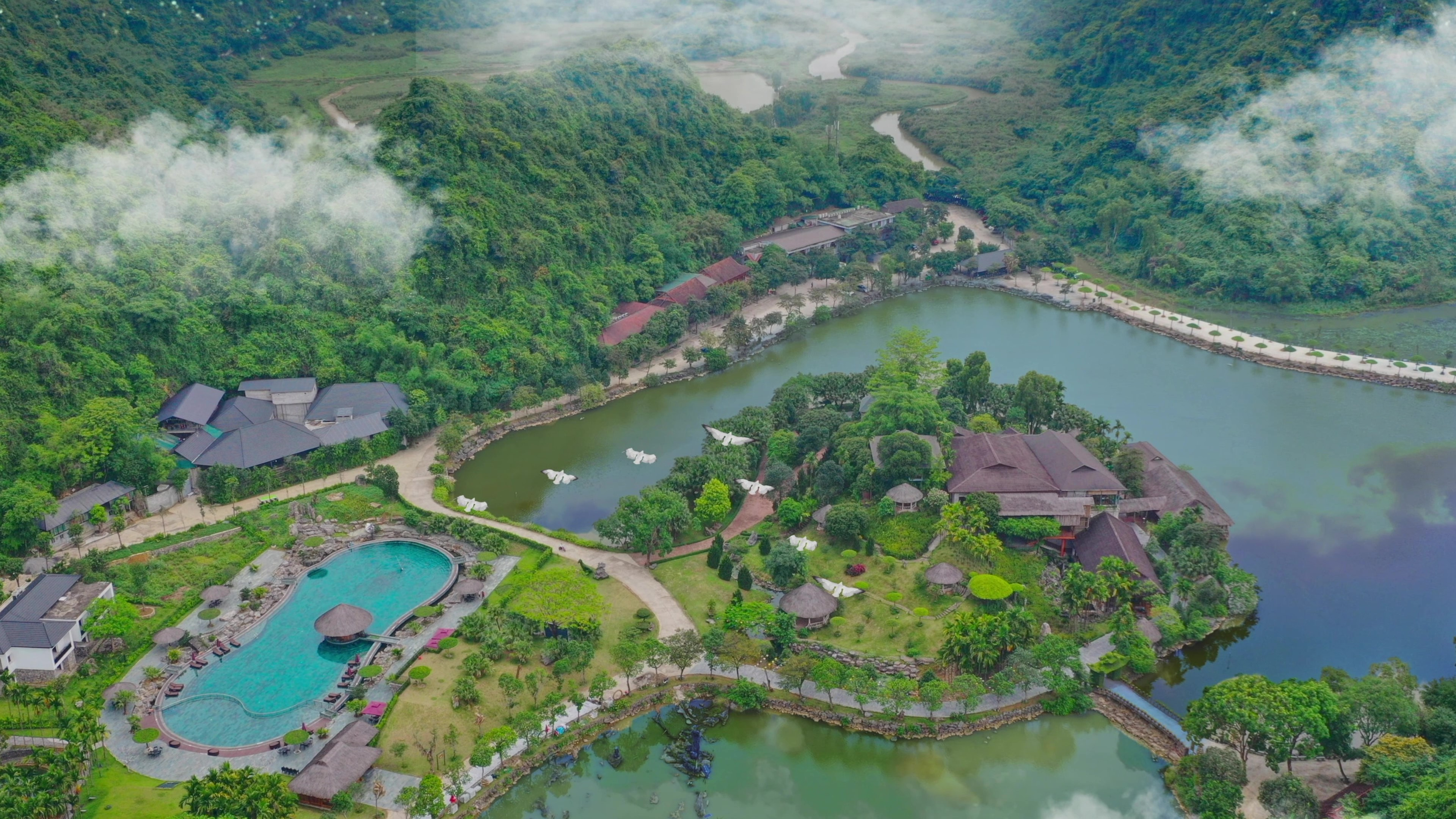
- View of Thung Nham – Vườn Chim
- Interactive map of Nam Hoa Lư
- Country: Vietnam
- Regions: Red River Delta
- Province: Ninh Bình Province
- Established: June 16, 2025

Area
  - Total: 54.30 km^{2} (20.97 sq mi)

Population (2025)
  - Total: 53,514
  - Density: 985.5/km^{2} (2,552/sq mi)
- Time zone: UTC+07:00 (Indochina Time)

Nam Hoa Lư is a ward (phường) of Ninh Bình Province, Vietnam.

== Geography ==
Nam Hoa Lư Ward located in southern Ninh Bình Province, and adjacent to:

- Hoa Lư Ward to the north
- Yên Thắng Ward and Yên Sơn Ward to the south
- Tây Hoa Lư Ward to the west
- Đông Hoa Lư Ward to the east.

== History ==
On June 12, 2025, the National Assembly of Vietnam issued Resolution No. 202/2025/QH15 on the arrangement of provincial-level administrative units (effective from June 12, 2025). Accordingly, the entire land area and population of Hà Nam Province, Nam Định Province and Ninh Bình Province were merged to form a new province named Ninh Bình Province.

On June 16, 2025, the Standing Committee of the National Assembly of Vietnam issued Resolution No. 1674/NQ-UBTVQH15 on the arrangement of commune-level administrative units of Ninh Bình Province in 2025 (effective from June 16, 2025). Accordingly, the entire land area and population of Ninh Phong Ward, Ninh Sơn Ward and Ninh Vân, Ninh An, Ninh Hải Communes were merged to form a new ward named Nam Hoa Lư Ward.
