= Hoa Lư (ward) =

Hoa Lư Phường Hoa Lư
- Ward
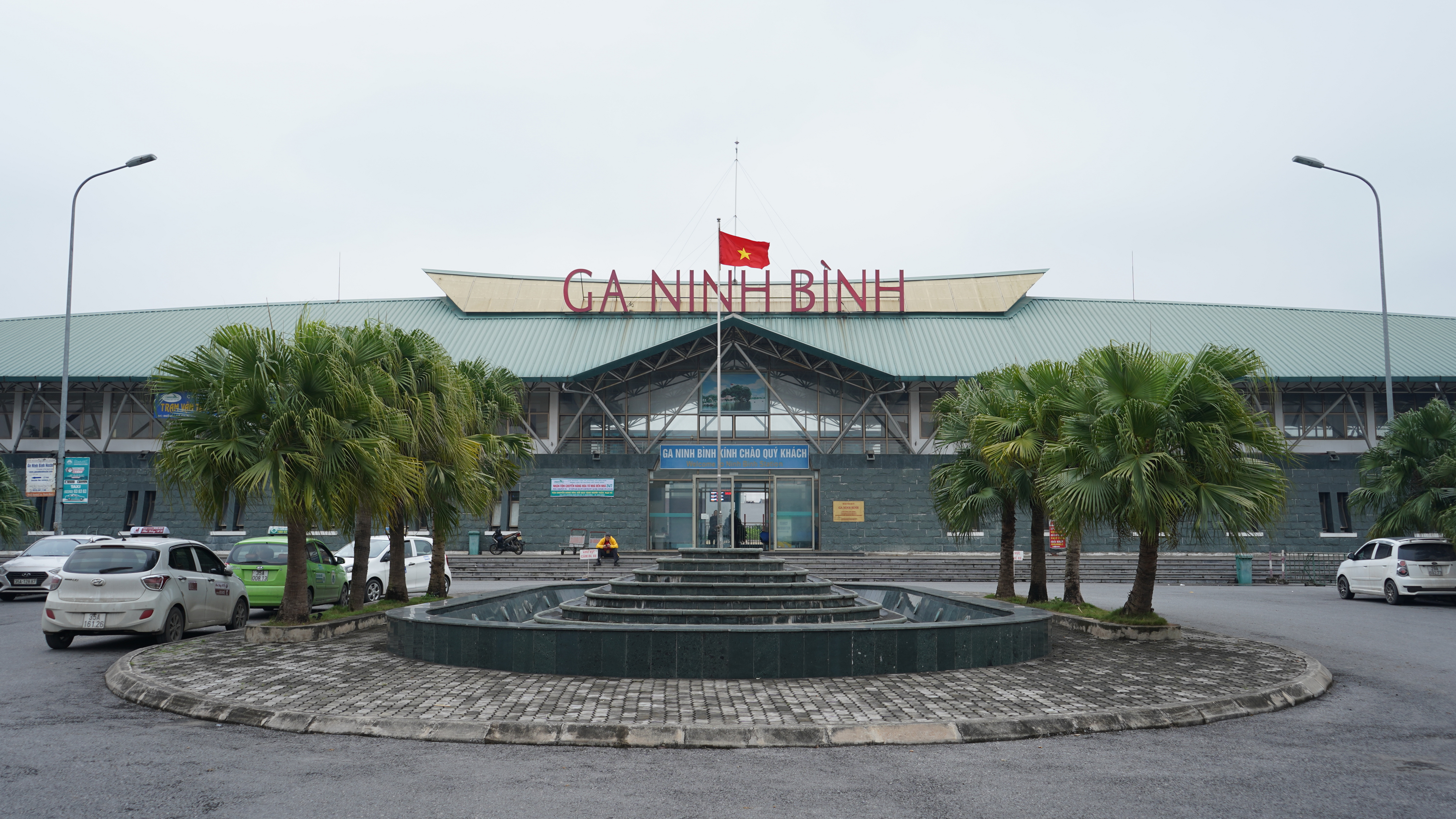
- Ninh Bình station
- Interactive map of Hoa Lư
- Country: Vietnam
- Regions: Red River Delta
- Province: Ninh Bình Province
- Established: June 16, 2025

Area
  - Total: 53.72 km^{2} (20.74 sq mi)

Population (2025)
  - Total: 148,406
  - Density: 2,763/km^{2} (7,155/sq mi)
- Time zone: UTC+07:00 (Indochina Time)

Hoa Lư is a ward (phường) of Ninh Bình Province, Vietnam. It is the capital of Ninh Bình Province.

== Geography ==
Hoa Lư Ward located in southern Ninh Bình Province, and adjacent to:

- Ý Yên Commune to the north
- Nam Hoa Lư Ward to the south
- Tây Hoa Lư Ward to the west
- Đông Hoa Lư Ward to the east.

== History ==
On June 12, 2025, the National Assembly of Vietnam issued Resolution No. 202/2025/QH15 on the arrangement of provincial-level administrative units (effective from June 12, 2025). Accordingly, the entire land area and population of Hà Nam Province, Nam Định Province and Ninh Bình Province were merged to form a new province named Ninh Bình Province.

On June 16, 2025, the Standing Committee of the National Assembly of Vietnam issued Resolution No. 1674/NQ-UBTVQH15 on the arrangement of commune-level administrative units of Ninh Bình Province in 2025 (effective from June 16, 2025). Accordingly, the entire land area and population of Ninh Mỹ, Ninh Khánh, Đông Thành, Tân Thành, Vân Giang, Nam Thành, Nam Bình, Bích Đào Wards, and Ninh Khang, Ninh Nhất, Ninh Tiến Communes were merged to form a new ward named Hoa Lư Ward.
