= Yên Khánh =

- Commune
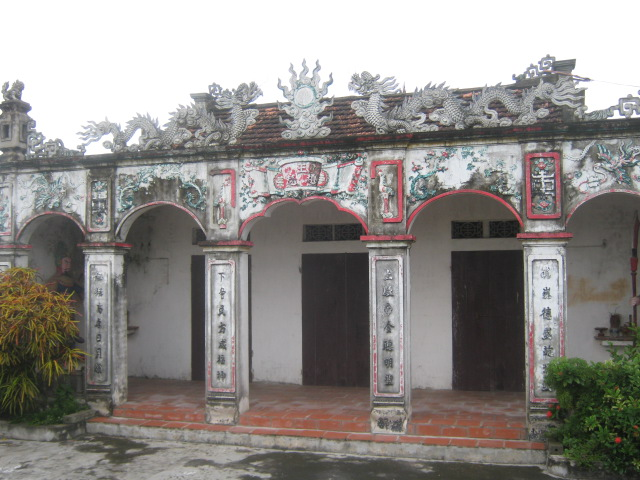
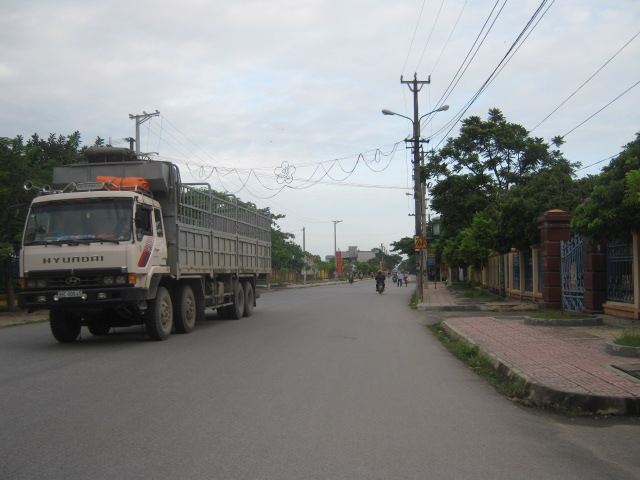
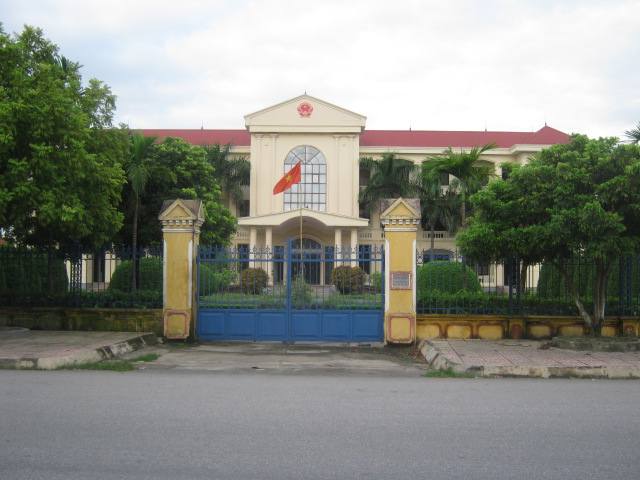
- Đền Triệu Việt Vương Quốc lộ 10 Trụ sở UBND
- Interactive map of Yên Khánh
- Coordinates: 20.184250359864926°N 106.06163822420335°E
- Country: Vietnam
- Region: Red River Delta
- Province: Ninh Bình
- Established: 16 June 2025
- Administrative headquarters: 298 Hòa Bình Hamlet

Area
  - Total: 29.88 km^{2} (11.54 sq mi)

Population (2025)
  - Total: 40,134
  - Density: 1,343/km^{2} (3,480/sq mi)
- Postal code: 08825
- Website: yenkhanh.ninhbinh.gov.vn

Yên Khánh is a commune in Ninh Bình province, Vietnam. It is one of 129 new communes and wards in Ninh Bình province established as part of the 2025 Vietnamese administrative reforms. The commune inherited its name from the former Yên Khánh district.

On 12 June 2025, the National Assembly of Vietnam adopted Resolution No. 202/2025/QH15 on the reorganization of provincial-level administrative units (effective from 12 June 2025). Under the resolution, Hà Nam province and Nam Định province were merged into Ninh Bình province.

On 16 June 2025:

- The National Assembly of Vietnam adopted Resolution No. 203/2025/QH15 amending and supplementing several articles of the Constitution of Vietnam. Under the resolution, district-level administrative units nationwide ceased to operate from 1 July 2025.
- The Standing Committee of the National Assembly of Vietnam issued Resolution No. 1674/NQ-UBTVQH15 on the arrangement of commune-level administrative units in Ninh Bình province in 2025. Under the resolution, Yên Ninh township, Khánh Cư commune, Khánh Hải commune, and Khánh Vân commune, formerly part of Yên Khánh district, were merged to form a new commune named Yên Khánh.
