= Ý Yên =

- Commune
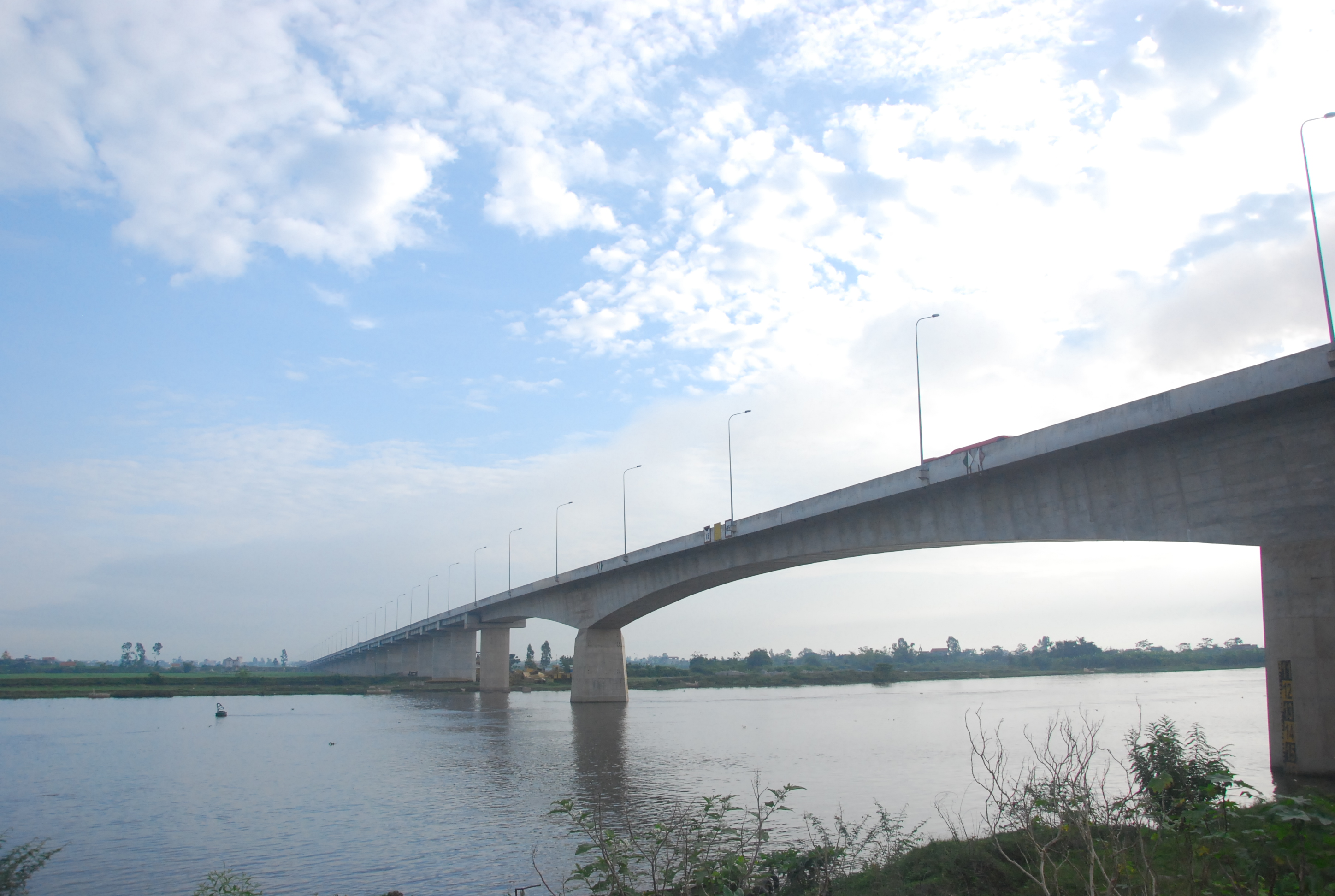
- Nam Bình Bridge
- Interactive map of Ý Yên
- Coordinates: 20.328180124658253°N 106.01257129186597°E
- Country: Vietnam
- Region: Red River Delta
- Province: Ninh Bình
- Established: 16 June 2025
- Administrative headquarters: Thanh Lịch Hamlet

Area
  - Total: 46.73 km^{2} (18.04 sq mi)

Population (2025)
  - Total: 53,419
  - Density: 1,143/km^{2} (2,960/sq mi)
- Website: yyen.ninhbinh.gov.vn

Ý Yên is a commune in Ninh Bình province, Vietnam. It is one of 129 new communes and wards in Ninh Bình province established as part of the 2025 commune-level administrative reorganization. The commune inherited its name from the former Ý Yên district, Nam Định province. The commune's administrative headquarters is located 10 km east of Hoa Lư Ward, the provincial capital of Ninh Bình province.

On 12 June 2025, the National Assembly of Vietnam adopted Resolution No. 202/2025/QH15 on the reorganization of provincial-level administrative units (effective from 12 June 2025). Under the resolution, Hà Nam province, Nam Định province, and Ninh Bình province were merged to form a new province named Ninh Bình.

On 16 June 2025:

- The National Assembly of Vietnam adopted Resolution No. 203/2025/QH15 amending and supplementing several articles of the Constitution of Vietnam (effective from 16 June 2025). Under the resolution, district-level administrative units nationwide ceased to operate from 1 July 2025.
- The Standing Committee of the National Assembly of Vietnam issued Resolution No. 1674/NQ-UBTVQH15 on the arrangement of commune-level administrative units in Ninh Bình province in 2025 (effective from 16 June 2025). Under the resolution, Lâm township and Yên Phong, Hồng Quang, and Yên Khánh communes were merged to form a new commune named Ý Yên.
