= Yên Mô district =

Coordinates: 20.083°N 106.000°E

Yên Mô District Huyện Yên Mô
- District
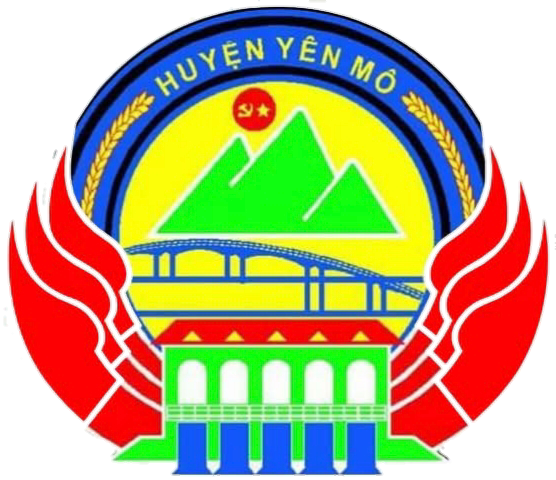
- Seal
- Interactive map of Yên Mô District
- Country: Vietnam
- Region: Red River Delta
- Province: Ninh Bình
- Capital: Yên Thịnh

Area
  - Total: 58 sq mi (149 km^{2})

Population (2003)
  - Total: 119,412
- Time zone: UTC+07:00 (Indochina Time)

Yên Mô is a former rural district of Ninh Bình province in the Red River Delta region of Vietnam. As of 2003 the district had a population of 119,412. The district covers an area of 149 km^{2}. The district capital lies at Yên Thịnh.
