= Bình Tân district, Vĩnh Long =

Coordinates: 10.1190°N 105.7560°E

Binh Tan district Huyện Bình Tân
- District
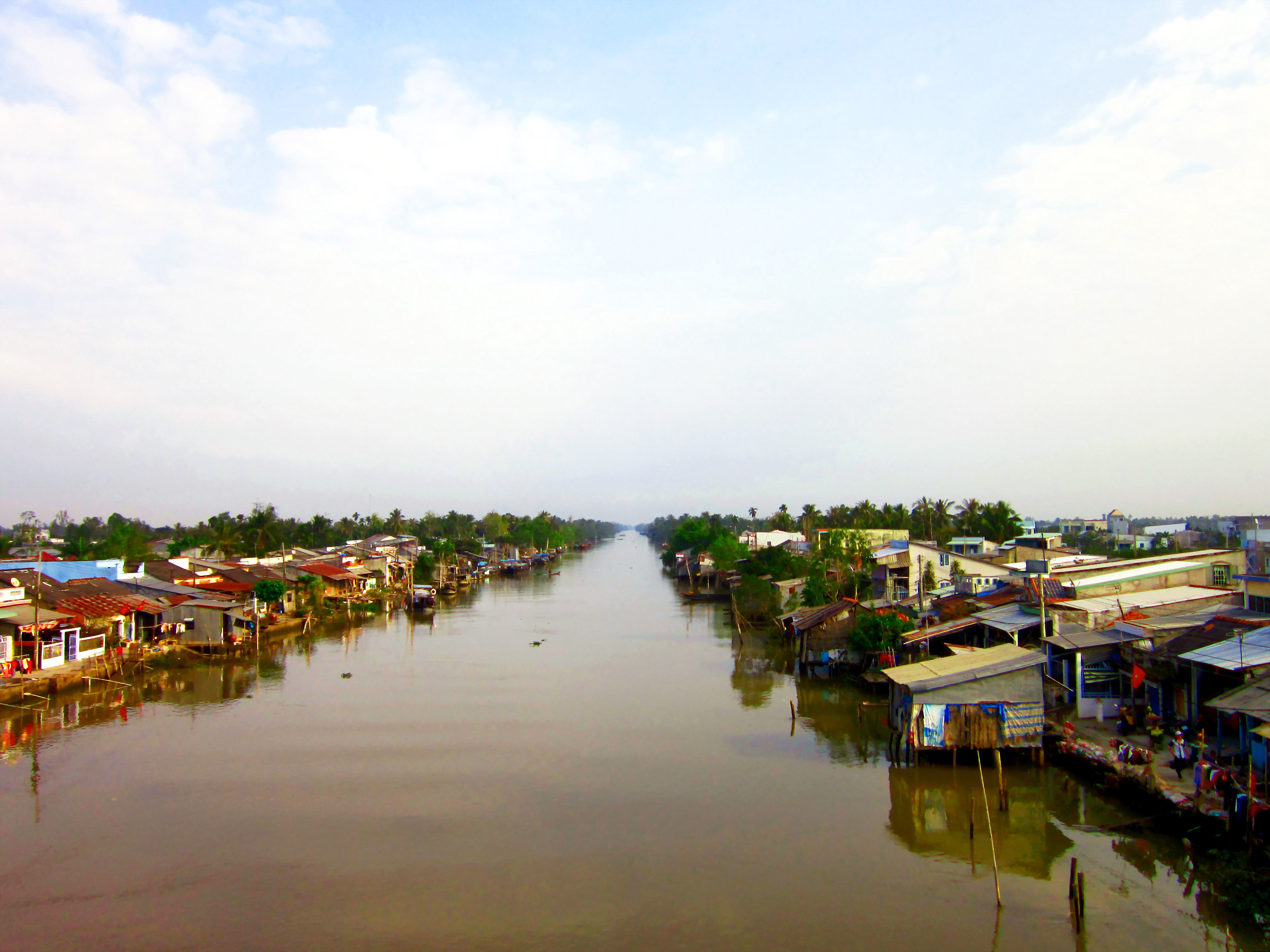
- Bà market, Thành Lợi
- Country: Vietnam
- Region: Mekong Delta
- Province: Vĩnh Long
- Capital: Tân Quới

Area
  - Total: 59.03 sq mi (152.89 km^{2})

Population (2009)
  - Total: 93,758
  - Density: 1,588.3/sq mi (613.24/km^{2})
- Time zone: UTC+7 (UTC + 7)

Bình Tân is a rural district (huyện) of Vĩnh Long province in the Mekong Delta region of Vietnam.
