= Tam Điệp (city) =

- Provincial city (Class-3)
- Tam Điệp City; Thành phố Tam Điệp
- Location in Vietnam
- Coordinates: 20°09′20″N 105°55′05″E
- Country: Vietnam
- Region: Red River Delta
- Province: Ninh Bình

Government
  - Type: City People's Committee

Area
  - Total: 40.53 sq mi (104.98 km^{2})

Population (2015)
  - Total: 104,175
  - Density: 2,570/sq mi (992/km^{2})
- Time zone: UTC+7 (Indochina Time)

Tam Điệp is a former provincial city of Ninh Bình province in the Red River Delta region of Vietnam.

== History ==
Its name Tam Điệp means "the three peaks", which is indicated with the large limestone mountain with five peaks (3 tall and 2 low) in the city center.

Tam Điệp City was established on 11 May 2015. As of 2015 it had a population of 104,175. The city covers an area of 105 km^{2}.
