= Châu Thành district, Đồng Tháp =

Châu Thành
- District
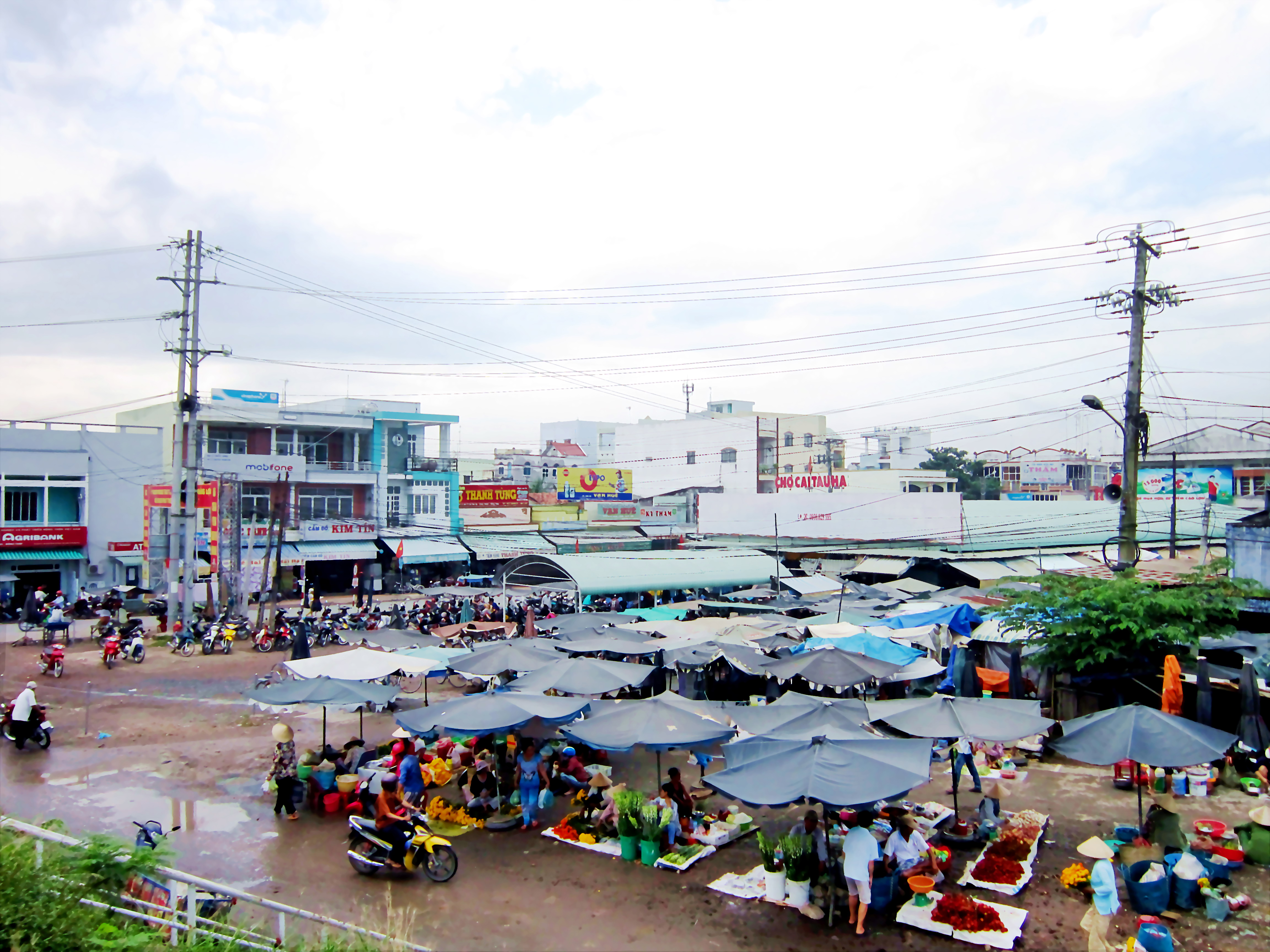
- Cái Tàu Hạ market
- Interactive map of Châu Thành
- Country: Vietnam
- Region: Mekong Delta
- Province: Đồng Tháp
- Founded: 1924
- Capital: Cái Tàu Hạ

Area
  - Total: 9,496 sq mi (24,594 km^{2})

Population (2019)
  - Total: 146,812
  - Density: 2,100/sq mi (809/km^{2})
- Time zone: UTC+7 (Indochina Time)
- Website: chauthanh.dongthap.gov.vn

Châu Thành is a former rural district (huyện) of Đồng Tháp province in the Mekong Delta region of Vietnam. As of 2019 the district had a population of 146,812. The district covers an area of 245 km^{2} (95 sq mi). The district capital lies at Cái Tàu Hạ commune-level town.

On June 16, 2025, the Standing Committee of the National Assembly issued Resolution No. 1685/NQ-UBTVQH15. The district was dissolved and new wards were rearranged from the district.

== Administrative division ==
Administratively, Châu Thành district, Đồng Tháp province is divided into 12 communes and 1 district town:

1. Cái Tàu Hạ commune-level town (Capital district)
2. Phú Hựu commune
3. An Nhơn commune
4. An Phú Thuận commune
5. An Khánh commune
6. Hoà Tân commune
7. Tân Nhuận Đông commune
8. An Hiệp commune
9. Tân Bình commune
10. Tân Phú Trung commune
11. Tân Phú commune
12. Phú Long commune.

== Gallery ==
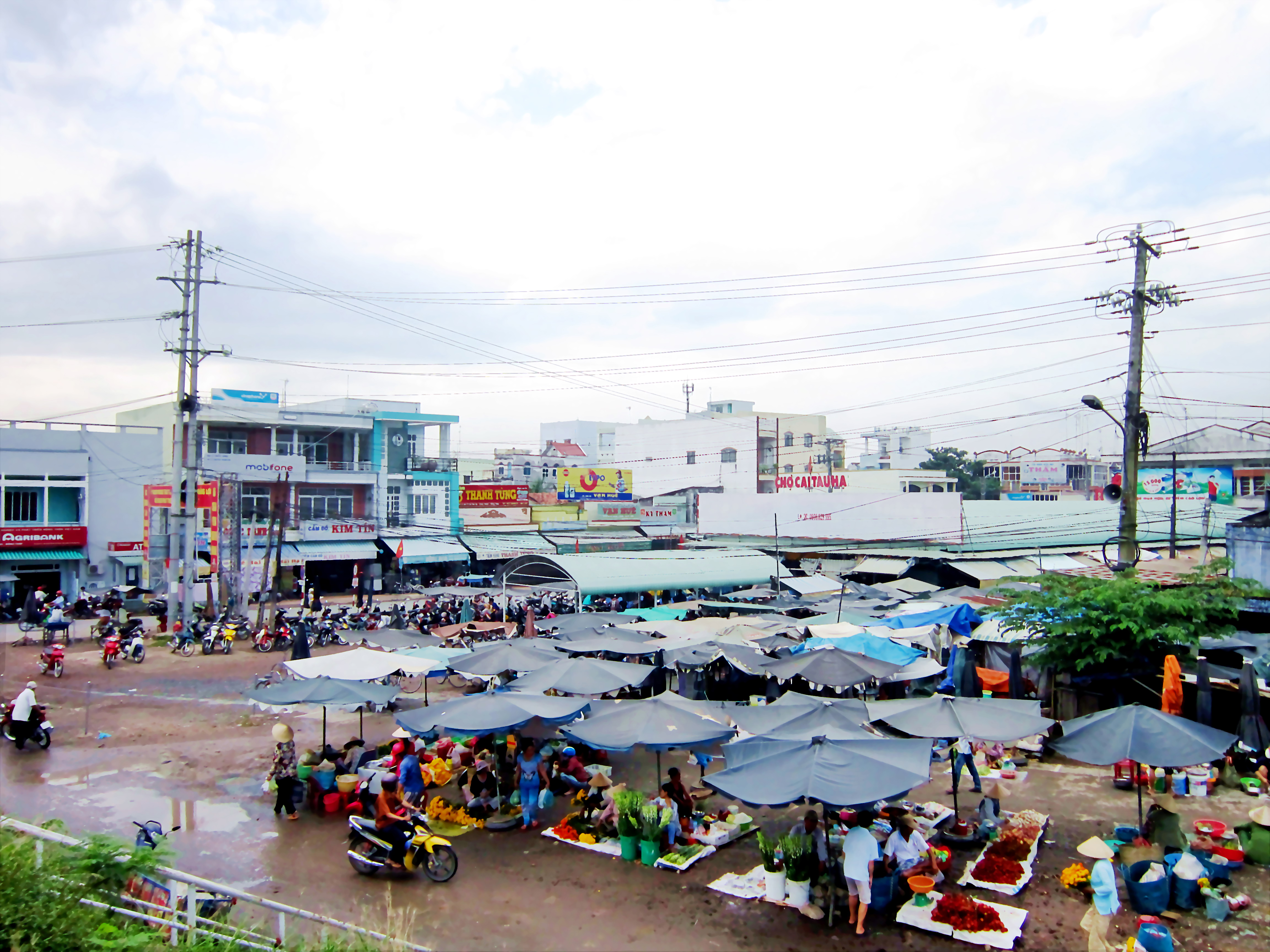
Town market Cái Tàu Hạ.

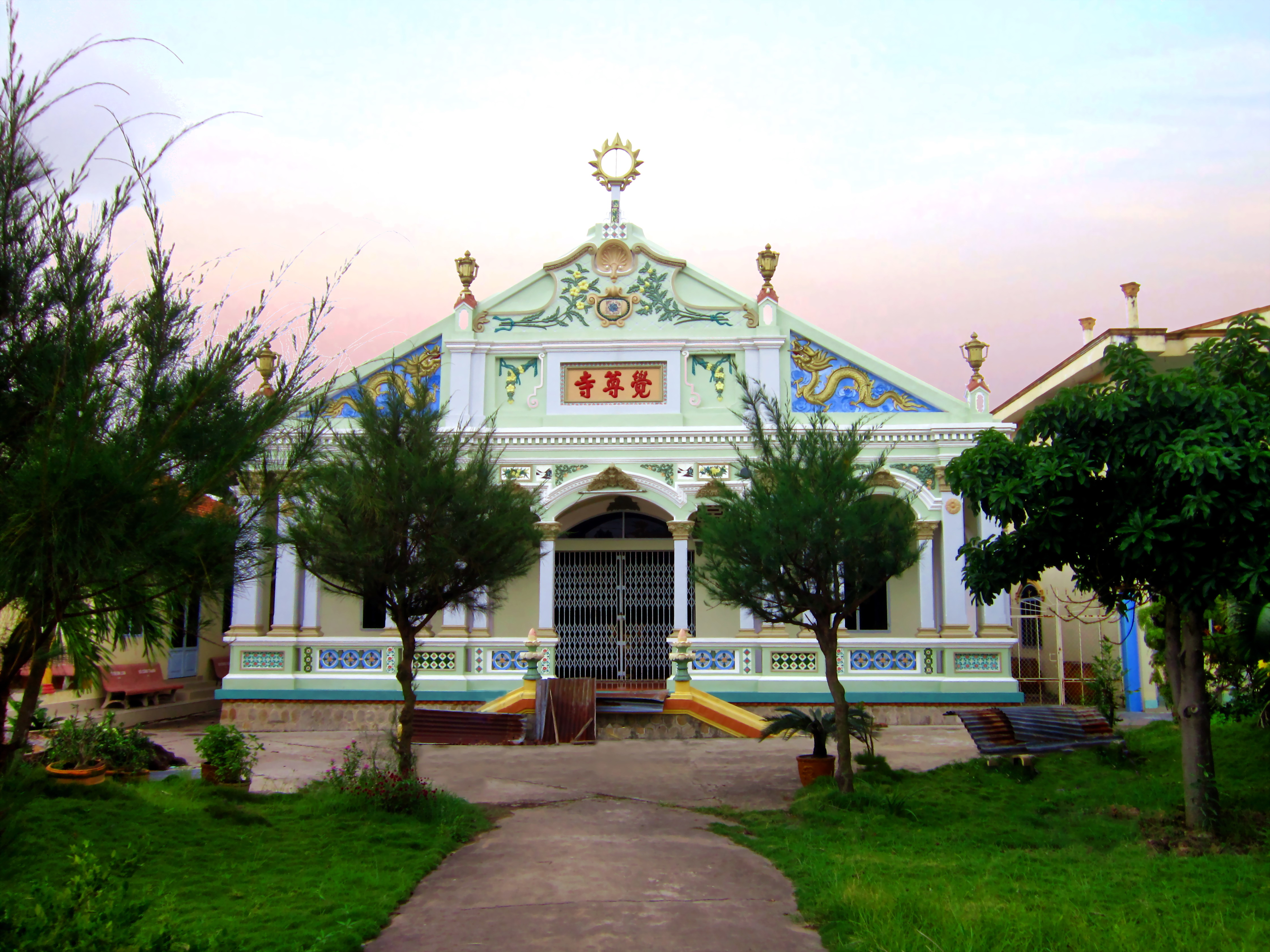
Giác Tôn Pagoda is in Tân Bình commune.

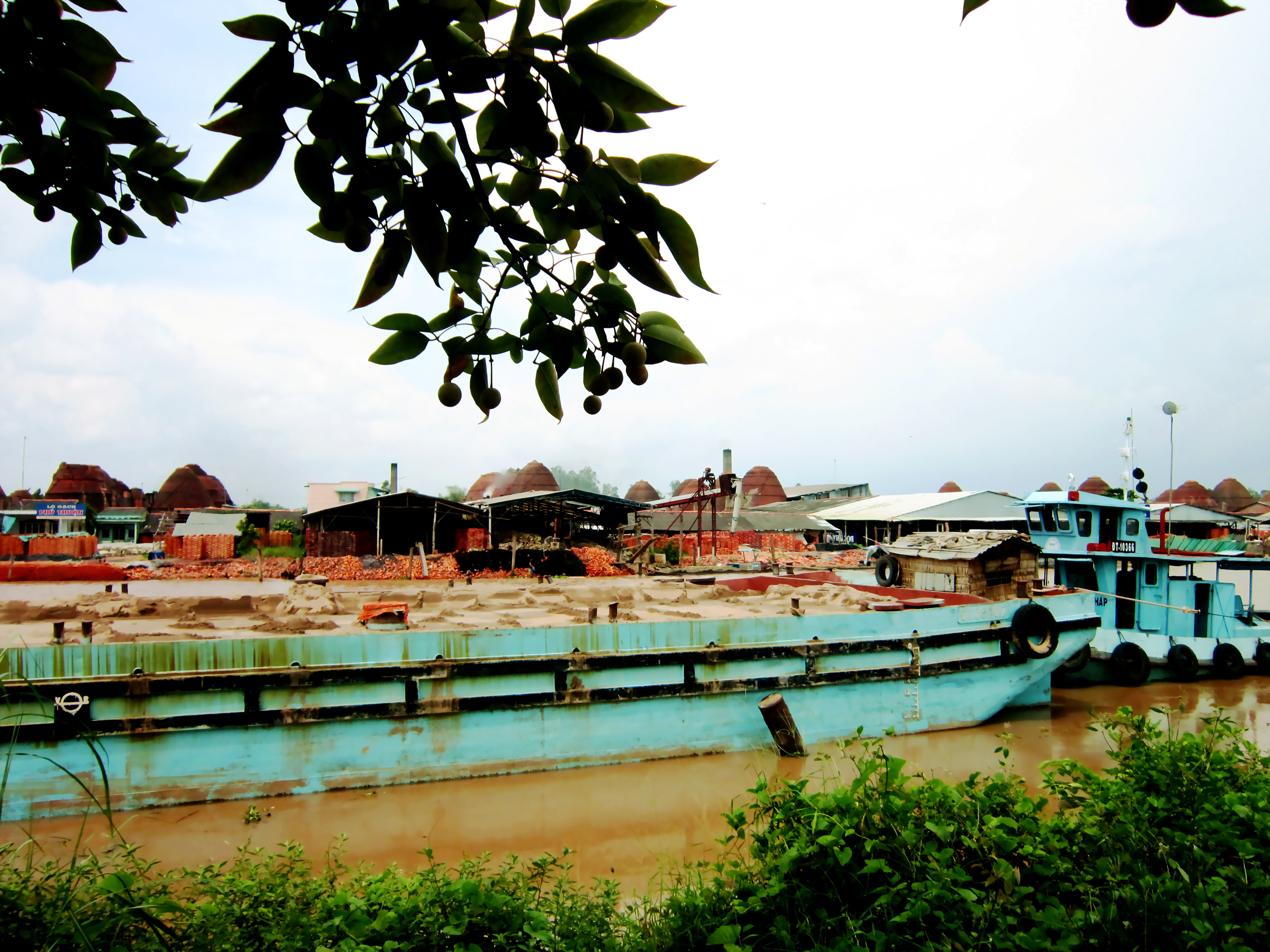
One of many fired brick kilns in An Hiệp.
