= Sa Đéc province =

Historic province of Vietnam

Coordinates: 10.32°N 105.73°E

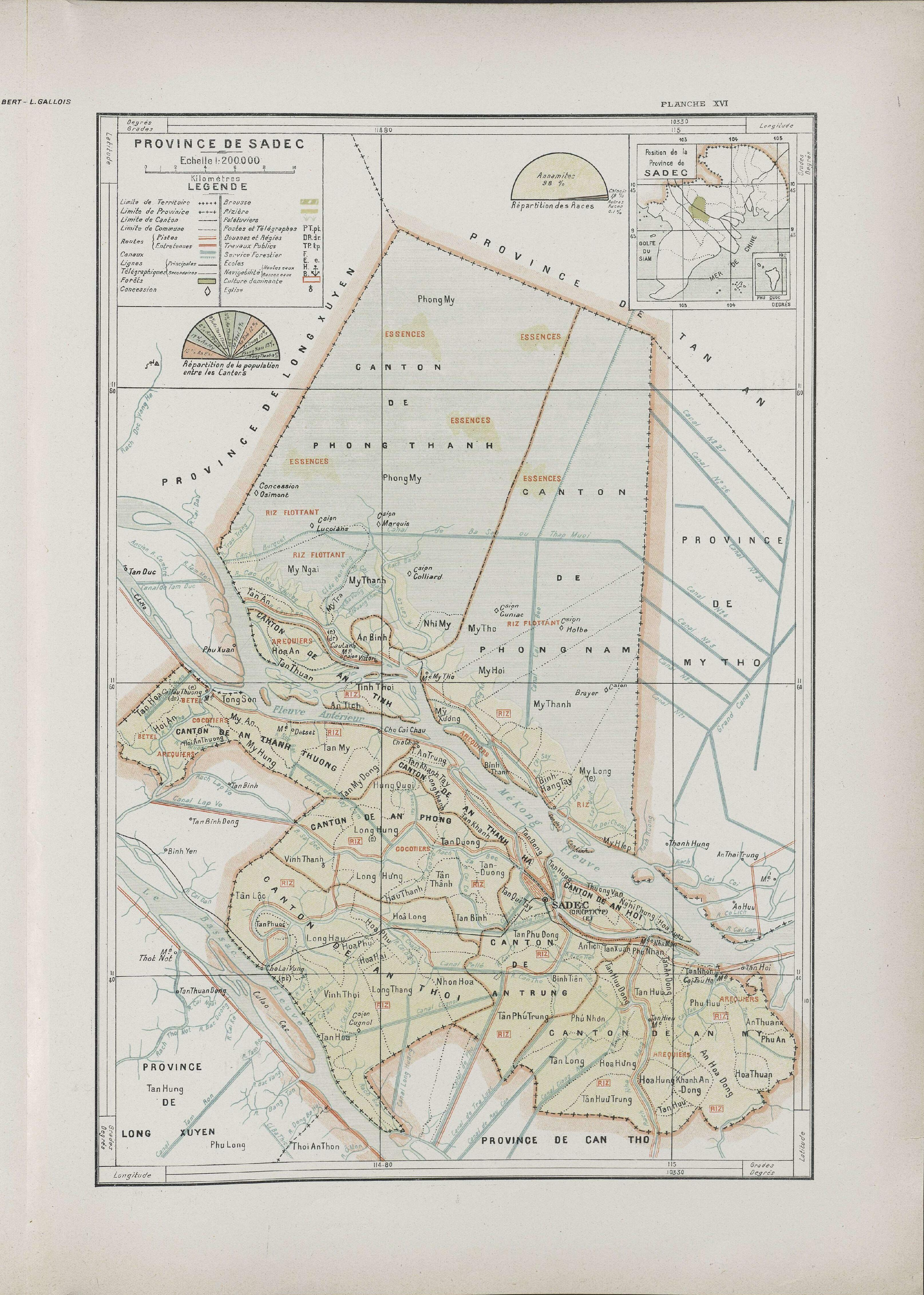
Map of Sa Dec province in 1909

Emblem of Sadec province

Sa Đéc (tỉnh Sa Đéc) is a former province of South Vietnam. In February 1976, after the fall of Saigon, Sa Đéc province merged with Kiến Phong province to form the new province of Đồng Tháp.

== Administrative divisions ==
In 1971, Sadec had an area of about 78,920 hectares, divided into four districts and 36 communes. The population is estimated at 315,556 people, divided as follows:

- Đức Thịnh District: An Tịch village, Tân Hiệp village, Bình Tiên village, Tân Phú Trung village, Tân Xuân village, Tân An Trung village, Tân Đông village, Tân Mỹ village, Tân Khánh village, Tân Khánh Tây village, Tân Vĩnh Hòa village, Hòa Thành village, Tân Dương village.
- Đức Thành District: Tân Thành village, Long Hậu village, Vĩnh Thới village, Tân Hòa Bình village, Hòa Long village, Tân Phước village, Long Thắng village, Phong Hòa village.
- Đức Tôn District: Phú Hựu village, An Nhơn village, Tân Nhuận Đông village, An Phú Nhuận village, An Khánh village, Hòa Tân village, Phú Long village.
- Lấp Vò District: Bình Thạnh Đông village, Bình Thạnh Tây village, Bình Thạnh Trung village, Hội An Đông village, Mỹ An Hưng village, Định Yên village, Vĩnh Thạnh village, Long Hưng village.
