= Tam Điệp =

- Ward
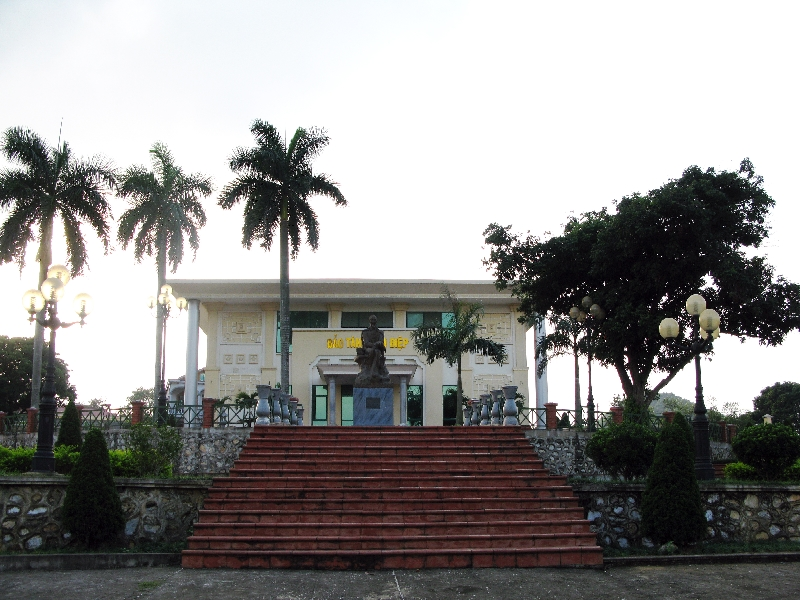
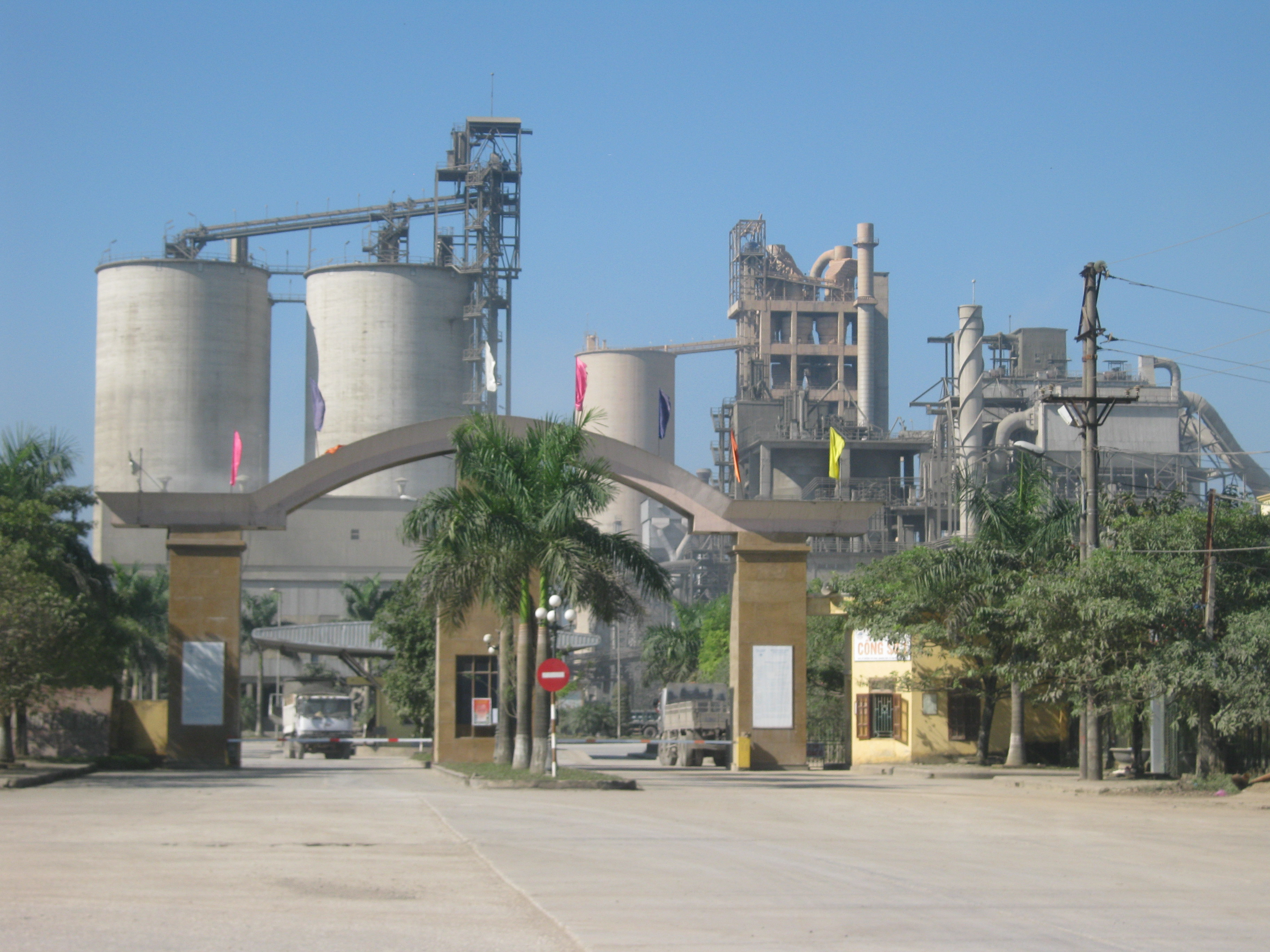
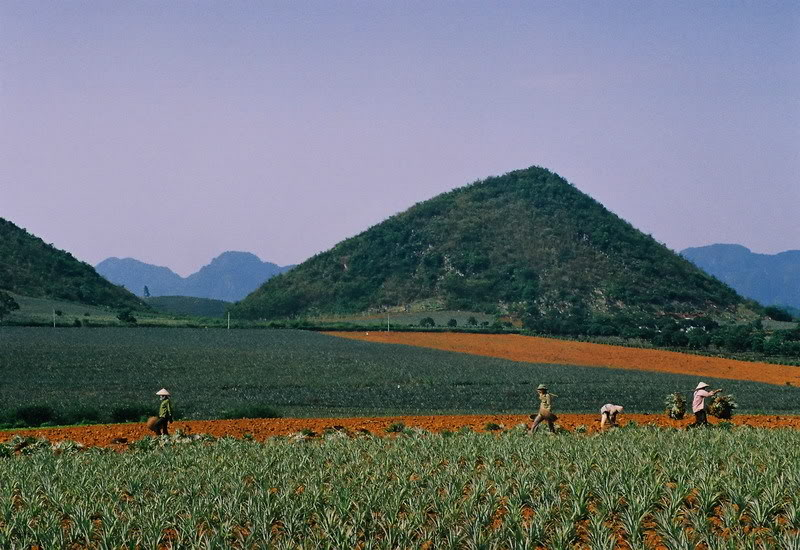
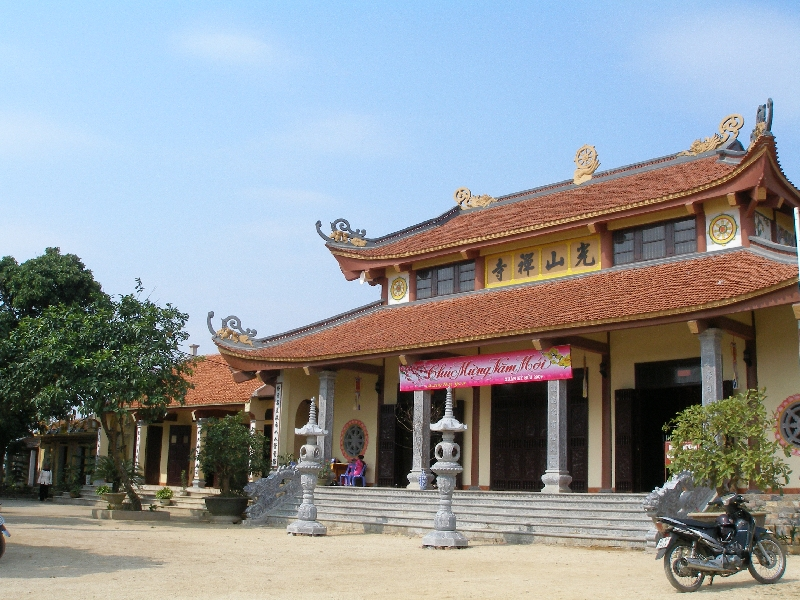
- Tam Điệp Museum Tam Điệp Cement Plant Đồng Giao Pineapple Farm Quang Sơn Pagoda
- Interactive map of Tam Điệp
- Coordinates: 20.15651995991419°N 105.91754613025994°E
- Country: Vietnam
- Region: Red River Delta
- Province: Ninh Bình
- Established: 16 June 2025
- Administrative headquarters: Residential Group 5

Area
  - Total: 41.20 km^{2} (15.91 sq mi)

Population (2025)
  - Total: 26,845
  - Density: 651/km^{2} (1,690/sq mi)
- Postal code: 08515
- Website: tamdiep.ninhbinh.gov.vn

Tam Điệp is a ward in Ninh Bình province, Vietnam. It is one of 129 new communes and wards in Ninh Bình province established as part of the 2025 Vietnamese administrative reforms. The ward inherited its name from the former city of Tam Điệp.

On 12 June 2025, the National Assembly of Vietnam adopted Resolution No. 202/2025/QH15 on the reorganization of provincial-level administrative units, which merged Hà Nam province and Nam Định province into Ninh Bình province.

On 16 June 2025, the National Assembly of Vietnam adopted Resolution No. 203/2025/QH15 amending and supplementing several articles of the Constitution of Vietnam, which provided for the termination of district-level administrative units nationwide from 1 July 2025.

On the same date, the Standing Committee of the National Assembly of Vietnam issued Resolution No. 1674/NQ-UBTVQH15 on the arrangement of commune-level administrative units in Ninh Bình province in 2025. Under the resolution, the entire area and population of Bắc Sơn and Tây Sơn wards, together with Quang Sơn commune, formerly part of Tam Điệp city, were merged to form a new ward named Tam Điệp.
