= Sa Đéc =

Sa Đéc may refer to:

- Sa Đéc, Đồng Tháp, a ward in Đồng Tháp province, Vietnam
  - Sa Đéc flower village, a village in Sa Đéc ward

== Former places ==
- Sa Đéc (city), a provincial city in Đồng Tháp province (now is Sa Đéc ward and a part of Tân Dương commune of Đồng Tháp province).
- Sa Đéc province, a historic province in Vietnam (1900—1976, today is part of Đồng Tháp province).

== Other ==
- Old name of the former Châu Thành district of Đồng Tháp province during certain periods of the 20th century.
- Sa Đéc Base, a former U.S. Navy and Republic of Vietnam Navy base near Sa Đéc in the Mekong Delta of Vietnam

== See also ==
- Bà Năm Sadec (1907–1988), Vietnamese actress and singer
