= Lai Vung =

- Commune
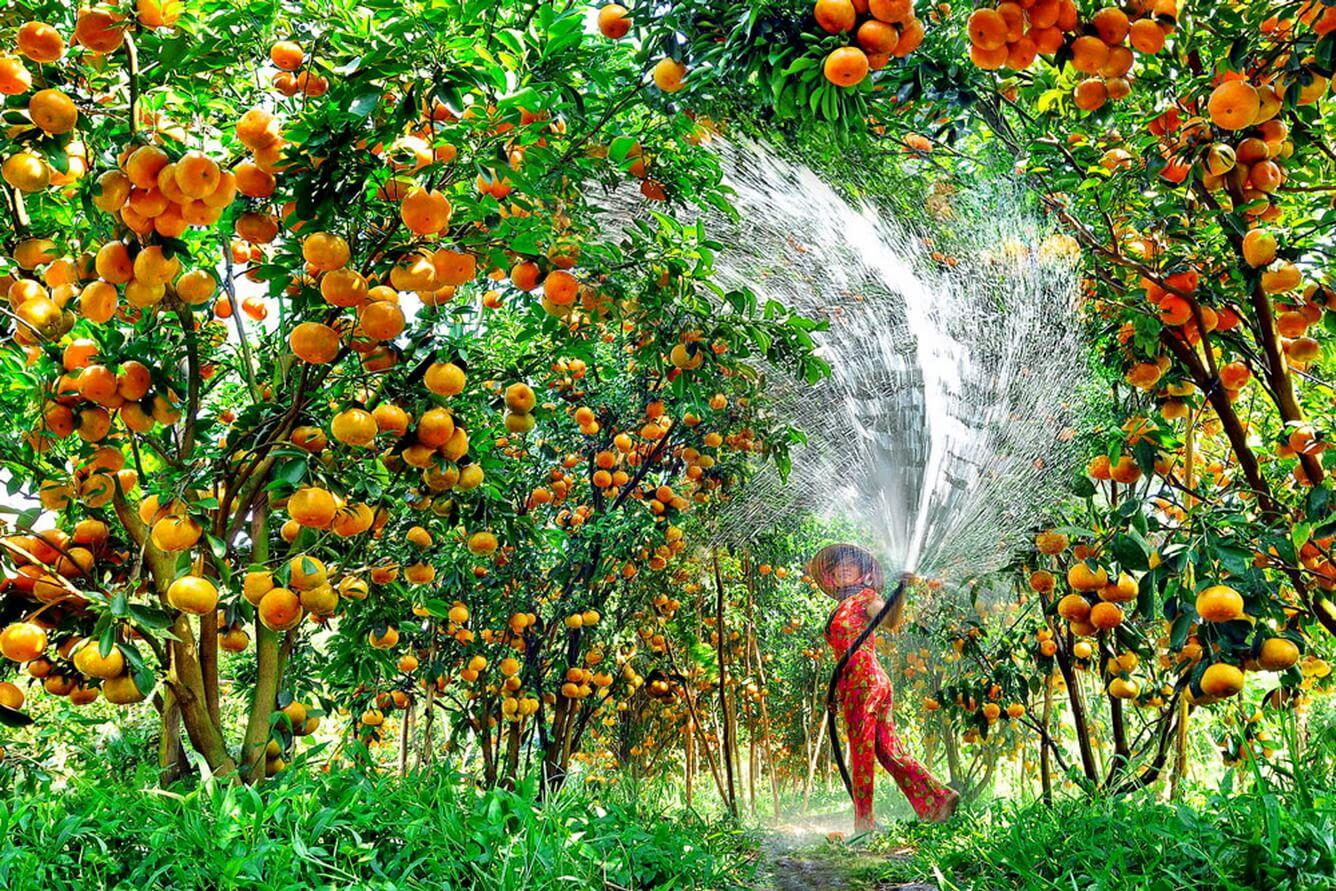
- Lai Vung mandarin is a specialty citrus fruit harvested near Lunar New Year
- Interactive map of Lai Vung
- Coordinates: 10°15′32″N 105°35′21″E
- Country: Vietnam
- Province: Đồng Tháp province
- Established: June 16, 2025

Area
  - Total: 27.51 sq mi (71.24 km^{2})

Population (2024)
  - Total: 80,649
  - Density: 2,932/sq mi (1,132/km^{2})
- Time zone: UTC+07:00 (Indochina Time)
- Administrative code: 30226

Lai Vung is a commune of Đồng Tháp province, Vietnam. It is one of the 102 new wards, communes and special zones of the province following the reorganization in 2025.

== Geography ==
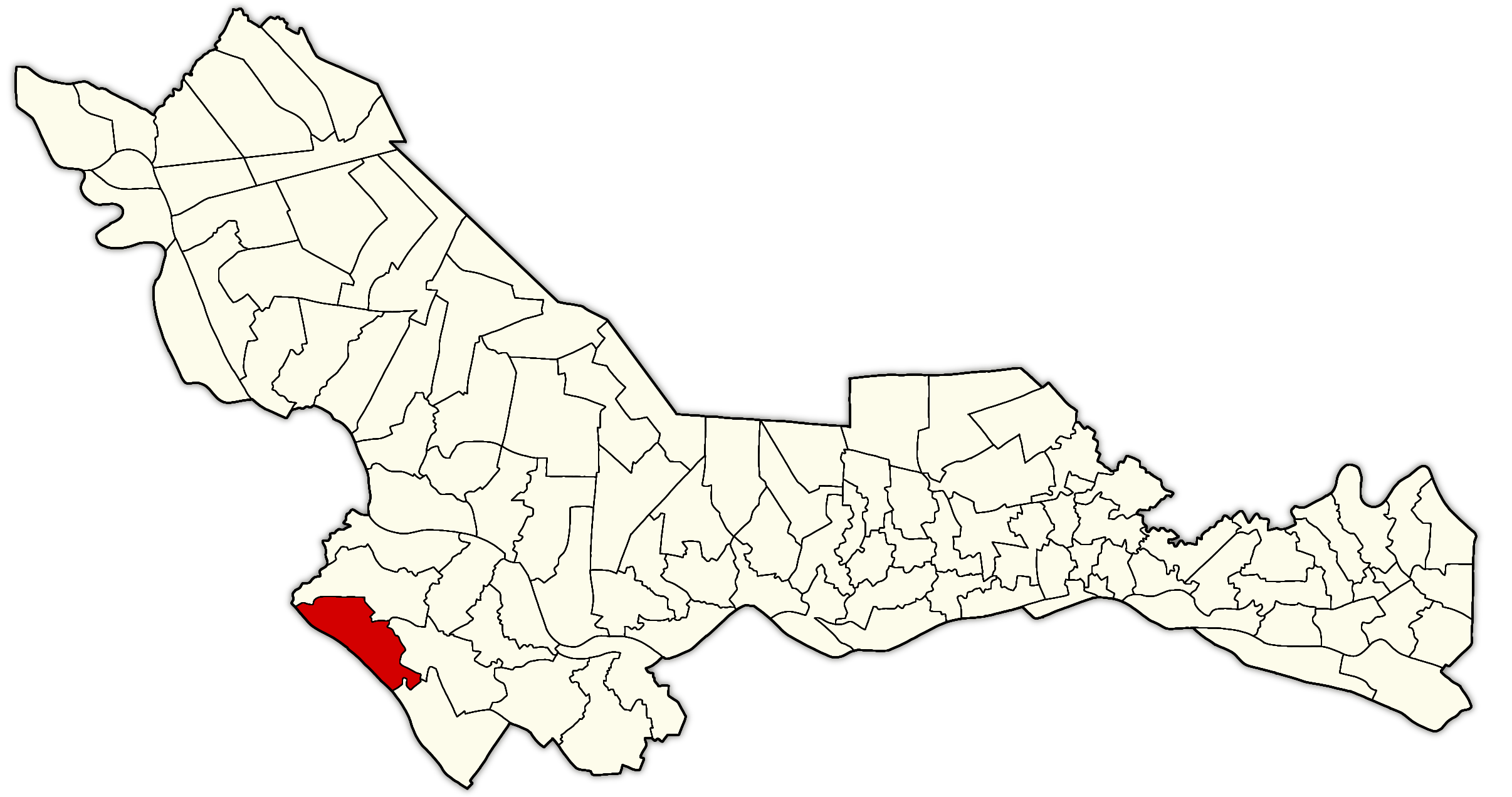
The map shows the location of Lai Vung commune, Đồng Tháp province (highlighted in red).

Lai Vung is located in the southern part of Đồng Tháp province. It borders:

- To the east: Hòa Long and Phong Hòa communes
- To the west: Mỹ Thới ward An Giang province and Thốt Nốt ward Cần Thơ City
- To the south: Tân Lộc ward Cần Thơ City
- To the north: Lấp Vò ward.

== Administrative divisions ==
As of June 2025, Lai Vung commune consists of 20 hamlets formed from the merger of four former communes:

- Định Yên: An Lợi A, An Lợi B, An Bình, An Khương
- Định An: An Hòa, An Ninh, An Phong, An Lạc
- Tân Phước: Tân Mỹ, Tân Thuận, Tân Phú, Tân Thạnh, Tân Quí
- Tân Thành: Tân An, Tân Bình, Tân Định, Tân Lợi, Tân Lộc, Tân Khánh, Tân Hưng

== History ==
On June 16, 2025, the National Assembly Standing Committee issued Resolution No. 1663/NQ-UBTVQH15 on the arrangement of commune-level administrative units of Đồng Tháp province in 2025 (effective from June 16, 2025). Accordingly, the entire land area and population of Tân Thành, Tân Phước communes of the former Lai Vung district and Định An, Định Yên communes of the former Lấp Vò district will be integrated into a new commune named Lai Vung (Clause 32, Article 1).
