= Mỹ An Hưng =

Commune in Đồng Tháp province, Vietnam

- Commune
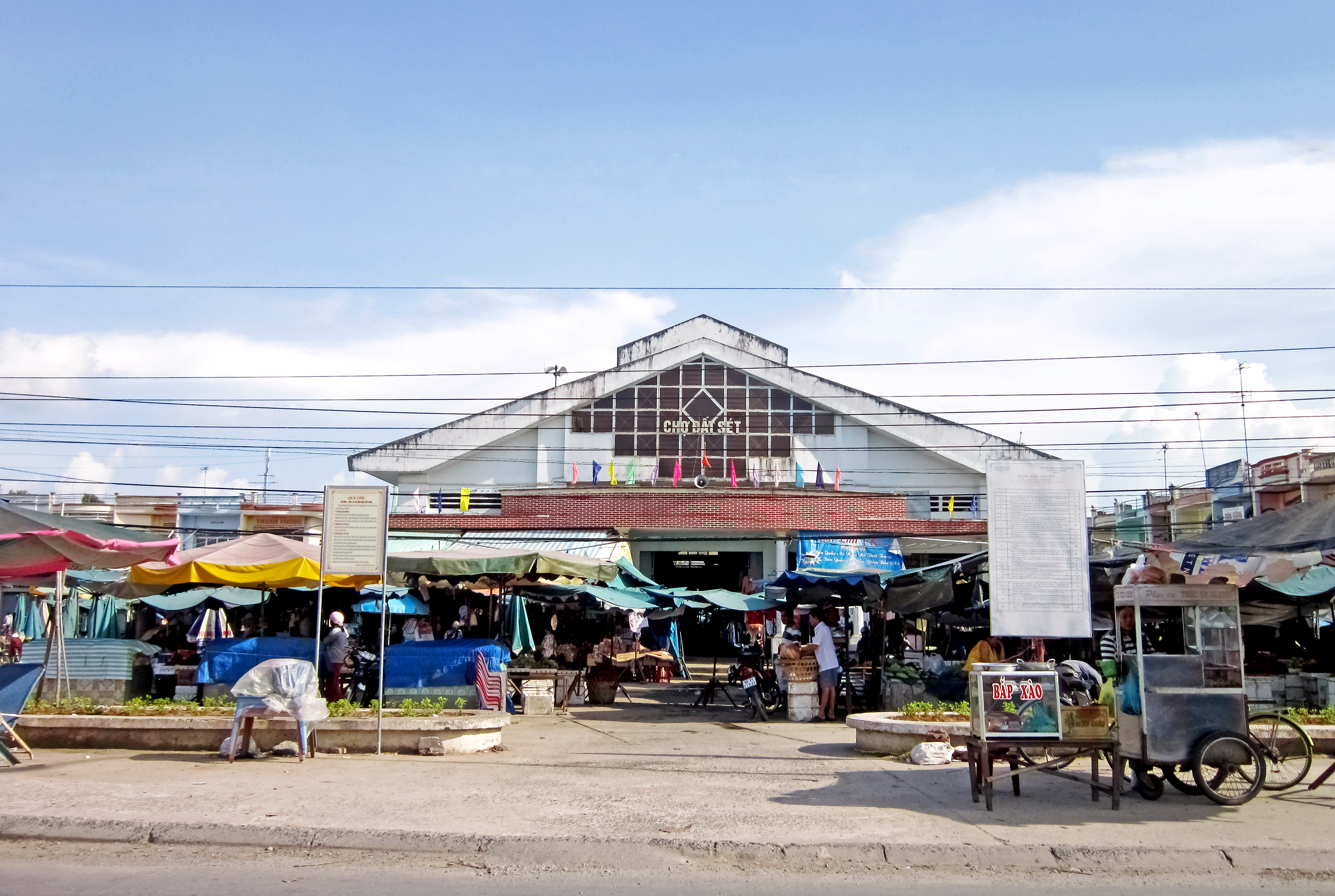
- Đất Sét market (also known as Mỹ An Hưng market)
- Interactive map of Mỹ An Hưng
- Country: Vietnam
- Region: Mekong Delta
- Province: Đồng Tháp
- Establish: June 16, 2026

Area
  - Total: 65 km^{2} (25 sq mi)

Population
  - Total: 55,372 people
  - Density: 850/km^{2} (2,200/sq mi)

Mỹ An Hưng is a commune in Đồng Tháp province, Vietnam. It is one of 102 communes and wards in the province following the 2025 reorganization.

== Geography ==
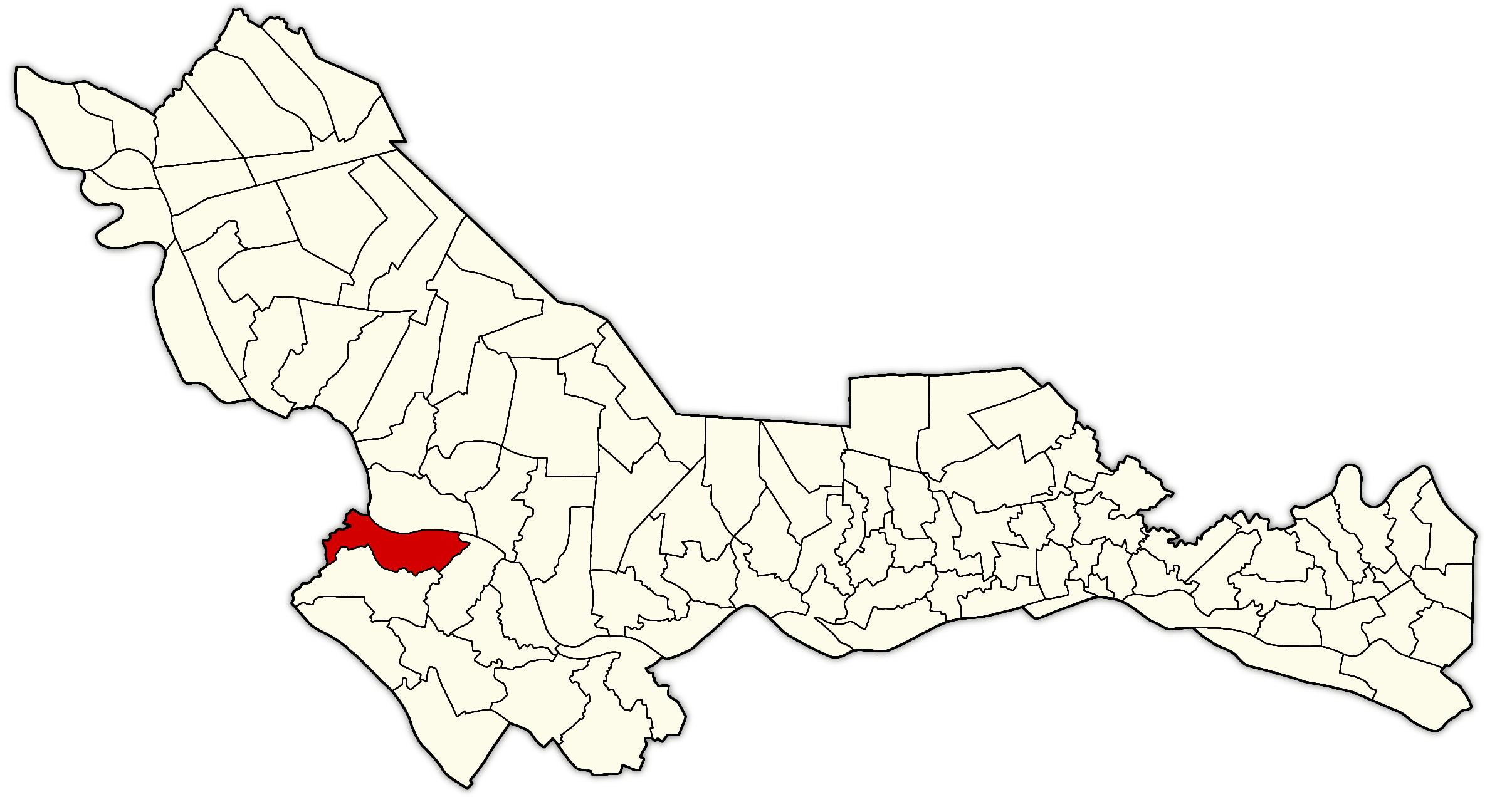
Location of Mỹ An Hưng commune on the map of Đồng Tháp province (highlight in red).

Mỹ An Hưng is a commune located in the southern part of Đồng Tháp province, approximately 110km west of Mỹ Tho ward and about 10km northwest of Sa Đéc ward. The commune has the following geographical location:

- To the north, it borders Cao Lãnh ward.
- To the west, it borders Tân Khánh Trung commune.
- To the south, it borders Lấp Vò commune.
- To the west, it borders An Giang province.

== History ==
Before 2025, Mỹ An Hưng commune consisted of four communes: Hội An Đông, Tân Mỹ, Mỹ An Hưng A, and Mỹ An Hưng B, all belonging to Lấp Vò district, Đồng Tháp province.

On June 12, 2025, the National Assembly of Vietnam issued Resolution No. 202/2025/QH15 on the reorganization of provincial-level administrative units, accordingly:

- The Đồng Tháp province was established by merging the entire area and population of Đồng Tháp province and Tiền Giang province.

On June 16, 2025, the Standing Committee of the National Assembly of Vietnam issued Resolution No. 1663/NQ-UBTVQH15 on the reorganization of commune-level administrative units in Đồng Tháp province. Accordingly:

- The Mỹ An Hưng commune was established by merging the entire area and population of Hội An Đông, Tân Mỹ, Mỹ An Hưng A, and Mỹ An Hưng B communes in the old Lấp Vò district (Excerpt from Clause 29, Article 1).
