= Lấp Vò =

- Ward
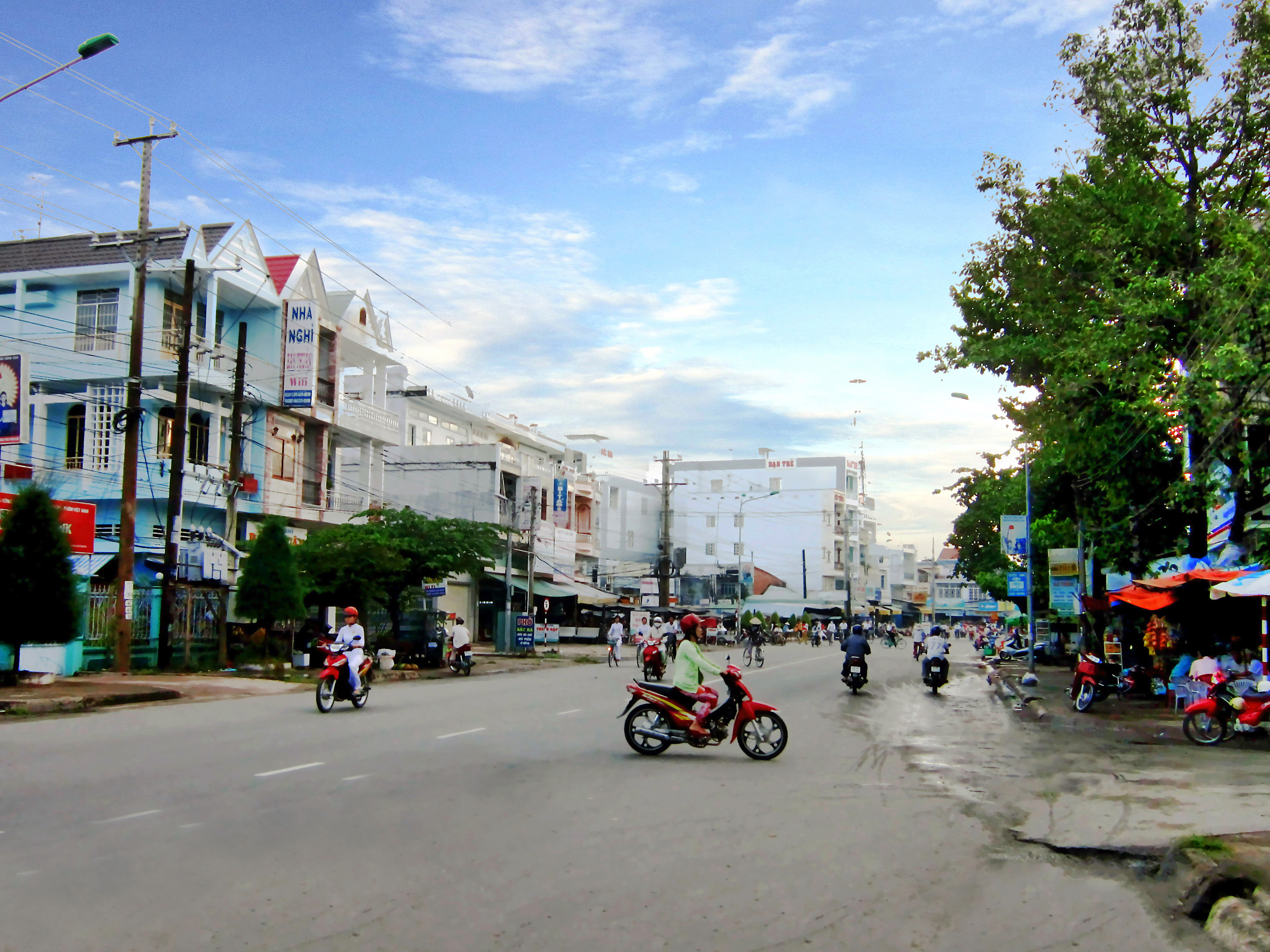
- Street in the center of Lấp Vò ward.
- Interactive map of Lấp Vò
- Coordinates: 10°21′44″N 105°31′22″E
- Country: Vietnam
- Province: Đồng Tháp
- Establish: June 16, 2025
- Become a ward: May 11, 2026

Area
  - Total: 33 sq mi (85 km^{2})

Population (2024)
  - Total: 73,883 people
  - Density: 2,300/sq mi (870/km^{2})
- Time zone: UTC+7 (UTC + 7)
- Administrative code: 30169

Lấp Vò is a ward of Đồng Tháp province, Vietnam. This is one of 102 communes and wards in the province.

== Geography ==
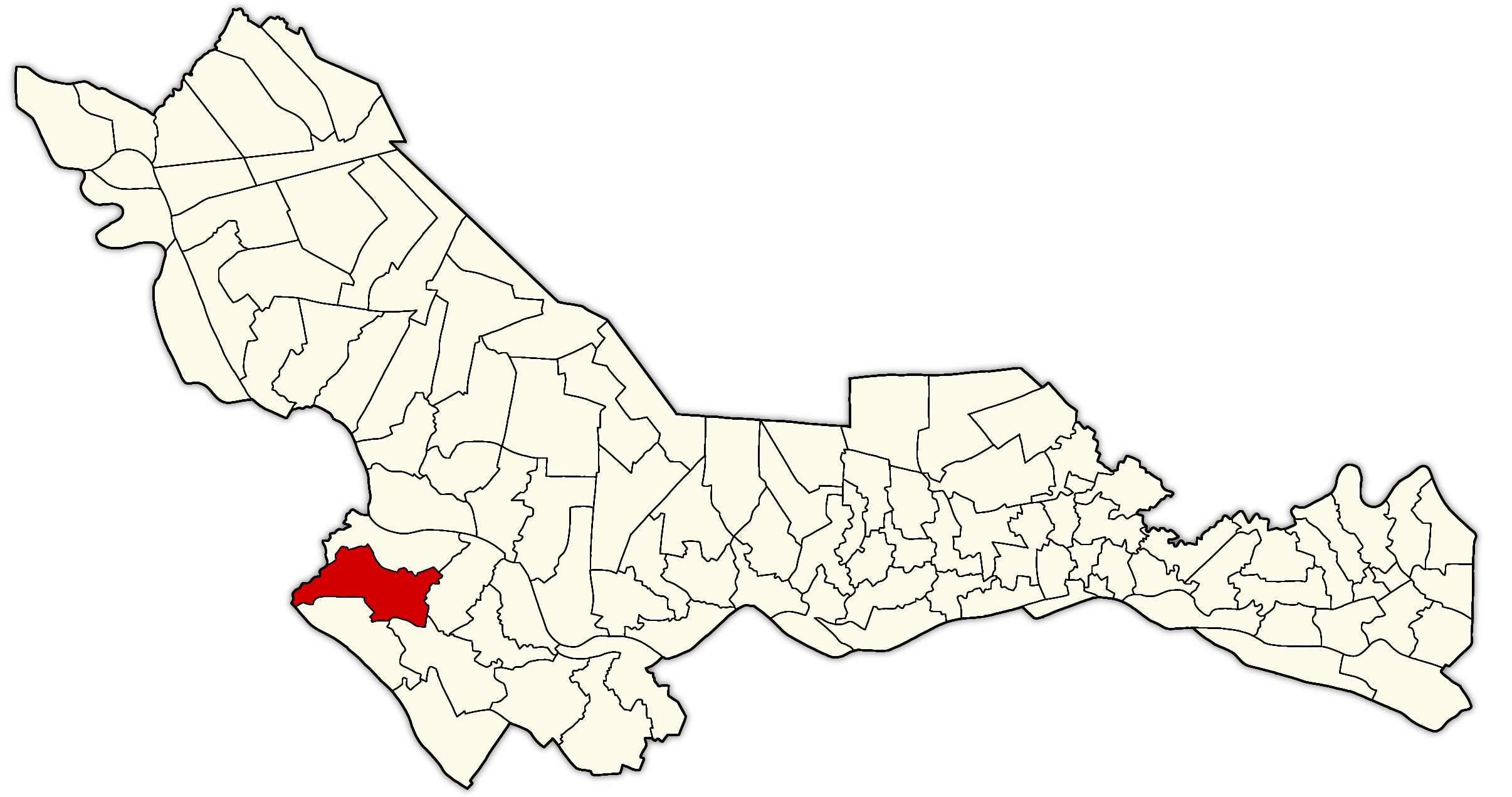
The map shows the location of Lấp Vò ward, Đồng Tháp province (highlighted in red).

Lấp Vò is a ward located in the southern part of Đồng Tháp province, 115km west of Mỹ Tho ward and 30km southwest of Cao Lãnh ward. The commune has a geographical location:

- To the north, it borders Mỹ An Hưng commune.
- To the east, it borders Tân Khánh Trung commune.
- To the south, it borders Hòa Long commune and Lai Vung commune.
- To the west, it borders An Giang province.

== History ==
On June 16, 2025, the National Assembly of Vietnam issued Resolution No. 1663/NQ-UBTVQH15 on the reorganization of commune-level administrative units in Đồng Tháp province. Accordingly:

- Lấp Vò commune was established by merging the entire area and population of Lấp Vò commune-level town, Bình Thành, Bình Thành Trung and Vĩnh Thạnh commune (formerly part of Lấp Vò district).

On May 11, 2026, the People's Council of Đồng Tháp province approved the plan to establish 11 new wards in the province. Accordingly:

- The Lấp Vò ward was established based on the entire area and population of Lấp Vò commune.

== Administrative divisions ==
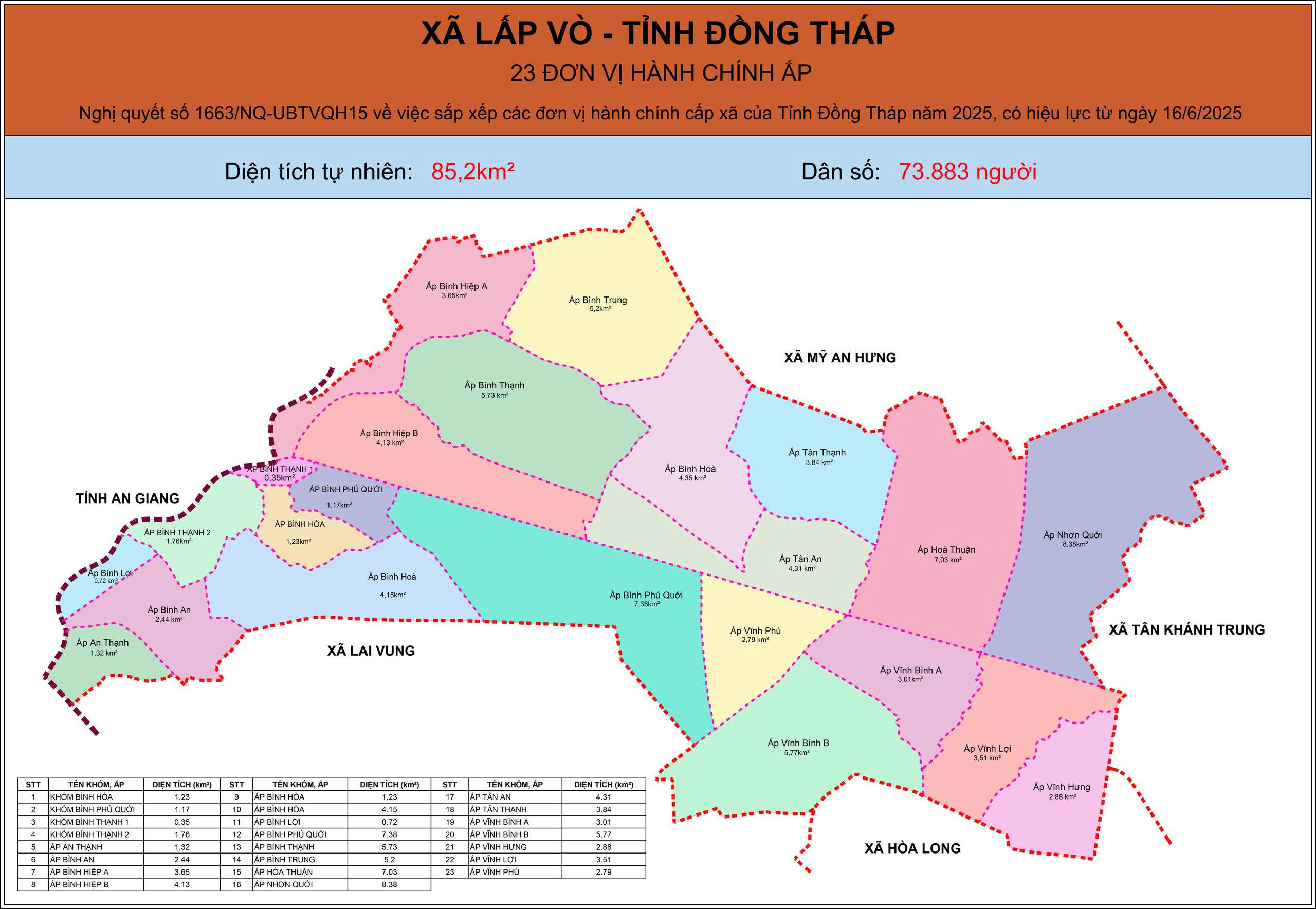
Hamlets of Lấp Vò

Lấp Vò is divided into 23 hamlets: An Thạnh, Bình An, Bình Hiệp A, Bình Hiệp B, Bình Hòa 1, Bình Hòa 2, Bình Hòa 3, Bình Lợi, Bình Phú Quới 1, Bình Phú Quới 2, Bình Thạnh, Bình Thạnh 1, Bình Thạnh 2, Bình Trung, Hòa Thuận, Nhơn Quới, Tân An, Tân Thạnh, Vĩnh Bình A, Vĩnh Bình B, Vĩnh Hưng, Vĩnh Lợi, Vĩnh Phú.
