= Dương Văn Pho =

Vietnamese footballer (born 1984)

Personal information
- Full name: Dương Văn Pho
- Date of birth: March 17, 1984 (age 42)
- Place of birth: Lấp Vò, Đồng Tháp, Vietnam
- Height: 1.78 m (5 ft 10 in)
- Position: Defender

Youth career
- 1997–2004: Đồng Tháp

Senior career*
Years	Team	Apps	(Gls)
2005–2008	Đồng Tháp	3	(0)
2009–2014	Hoàng Anh Gia Lai	72	(2)
2015–2016	Đồng Nai	23	(0)
2016–2018	Hoàng Anh Gia Lai	19	(0)
2019–2020	Đồng Nai	26	(0)
- * Club domestic league appearances and goals as of 18 March 2017

Dương Văn Pho (born 17 March 1984) is a Vietnamese footballer who plays as a defender for V-League club Đồng Nai.
