= Tân Khánh Trung =

Commune in Đồng Tháp province, Vietnam

- Commune
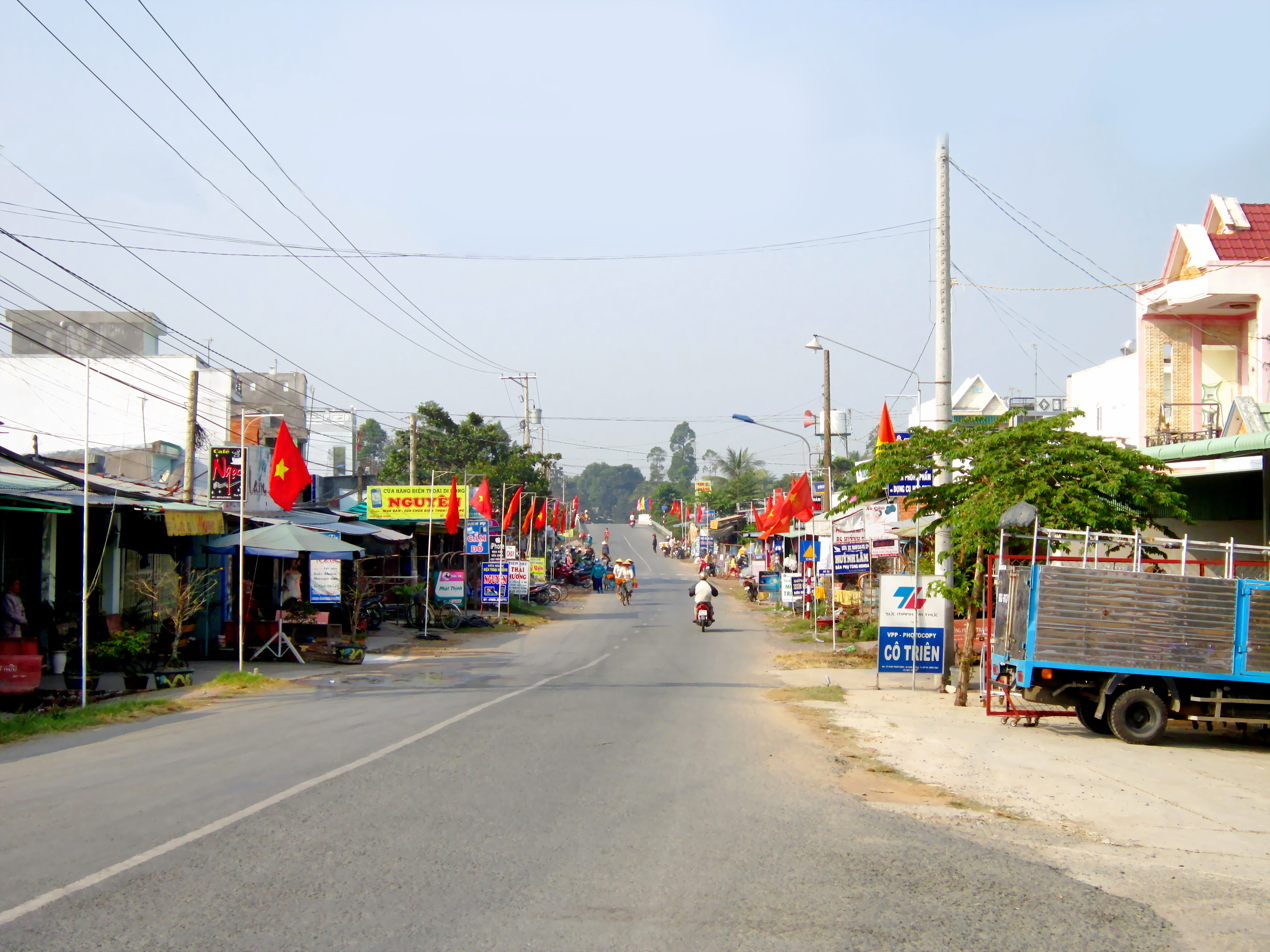
- Vàm Đinh market in Tân Khánh Trung commune.
- Interactive map of Tân Khánh Trung
- Country: Vietnam
- Region: Mekong Delta
- Province: Đồng Tháp
- Establish: June 16, 2025

Area
  - Total: 60 km^{2} (23 sq mi)

Population
  - Total: 46,858 people
  - Density: 780/km^{2} (2,000/sq mi)
- Administrative code: 30184

Tân Khánh Trung is a commune in Đồng Tháp province, Vietnam. It is one of 102 communes and wards in the province.

== Geography ==
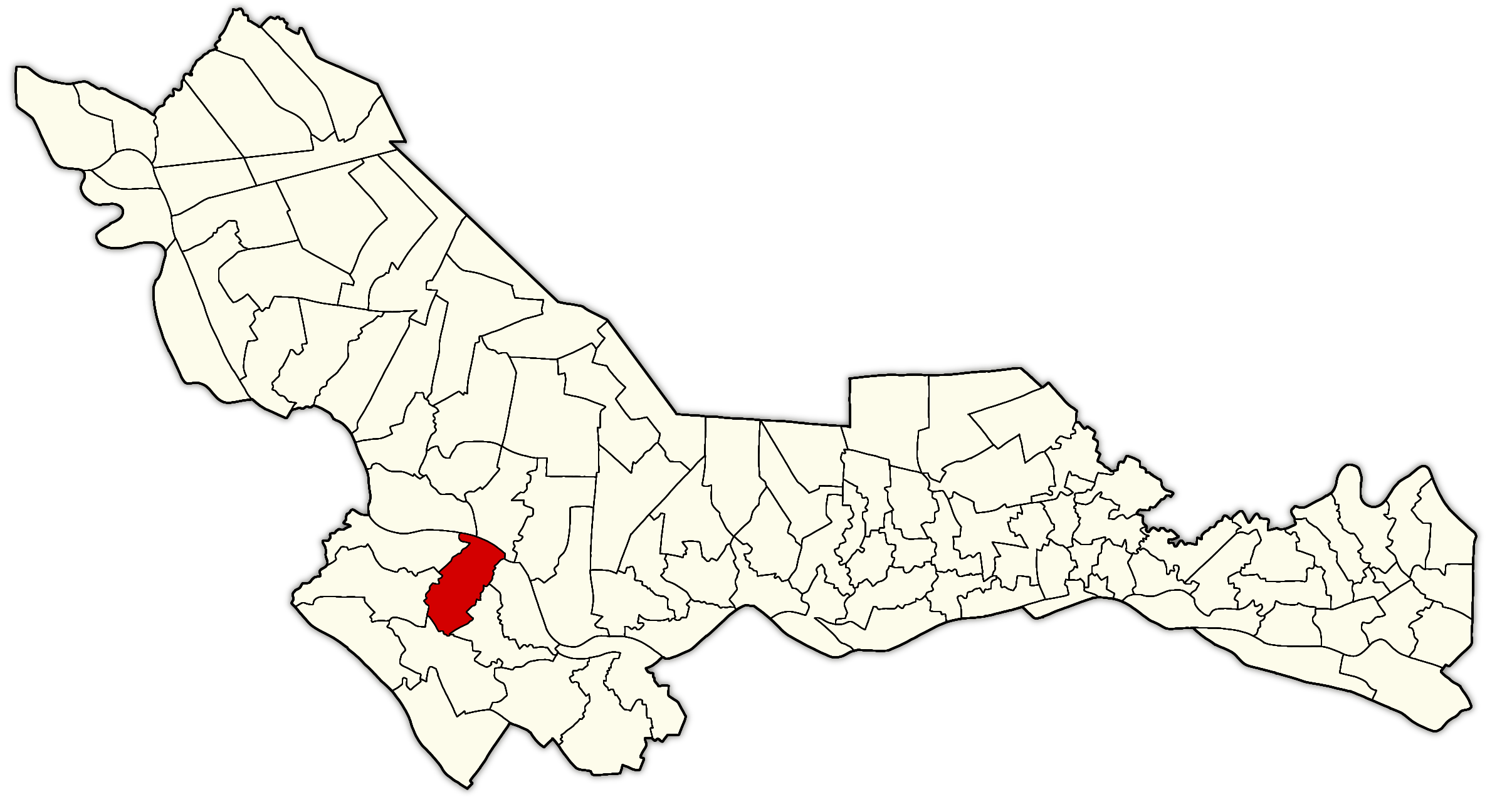
Location of Tân Khánh Trung commune on the map of Đồng Tháp province (highlight in red).

Tân Khánh Trung is a commune located in the southern part of Đồng Tháp province, 100km west of Mỹ Tho ward and 65km southeast from Hồng Ngự ward. The commune has a geographical location:

- To the north, it borders Cao Lãnh ward and Mỹ Thọ ward.
- To the east, it borders Sa Đéc ward.
- To the southeast, it borders Tân Dương commune.
- To the south, it borders Hòa Long commune.
- To the west, it borders Mỹ An Hưng commune and Lấp Vò ward.

== History ==
Before 2025, the current area of Tân Khánh Trung commune will correspond to three communes: Tân Khánh Trung, Long Hưng A, and Long Hưng B, all located in Lấp Vò district, Đồng Tháp province.

On June 12, 2025, the 15th National Assembly of Vietnam issued Resolution No. 202/2025/QH15 on the rearrangement of provincial-level administrative units. Accordingly:

- The Đồng Tháp province was established by merging the entire area and population of Đồng Tháp province and Tiền Giang province.

On June 16, 2025, the Standing Committee of the National Assembly of Vietnam issued Resolution No. 1663/NQ-UBTVQH15 on the rearrangement of commune-level administrative units in Đồng Tháp province in 2025. Accordingly:

- The commune of Tân Khánh Trung was established by merging the entire area and population of Tân Khánh Trung commune, Long Hưng A commune, and Long Hưng B commune, formerly belonging to Lấp Vò district (excerpt from Clause 30, Article 1).
