= Tân Dương =

- Commune
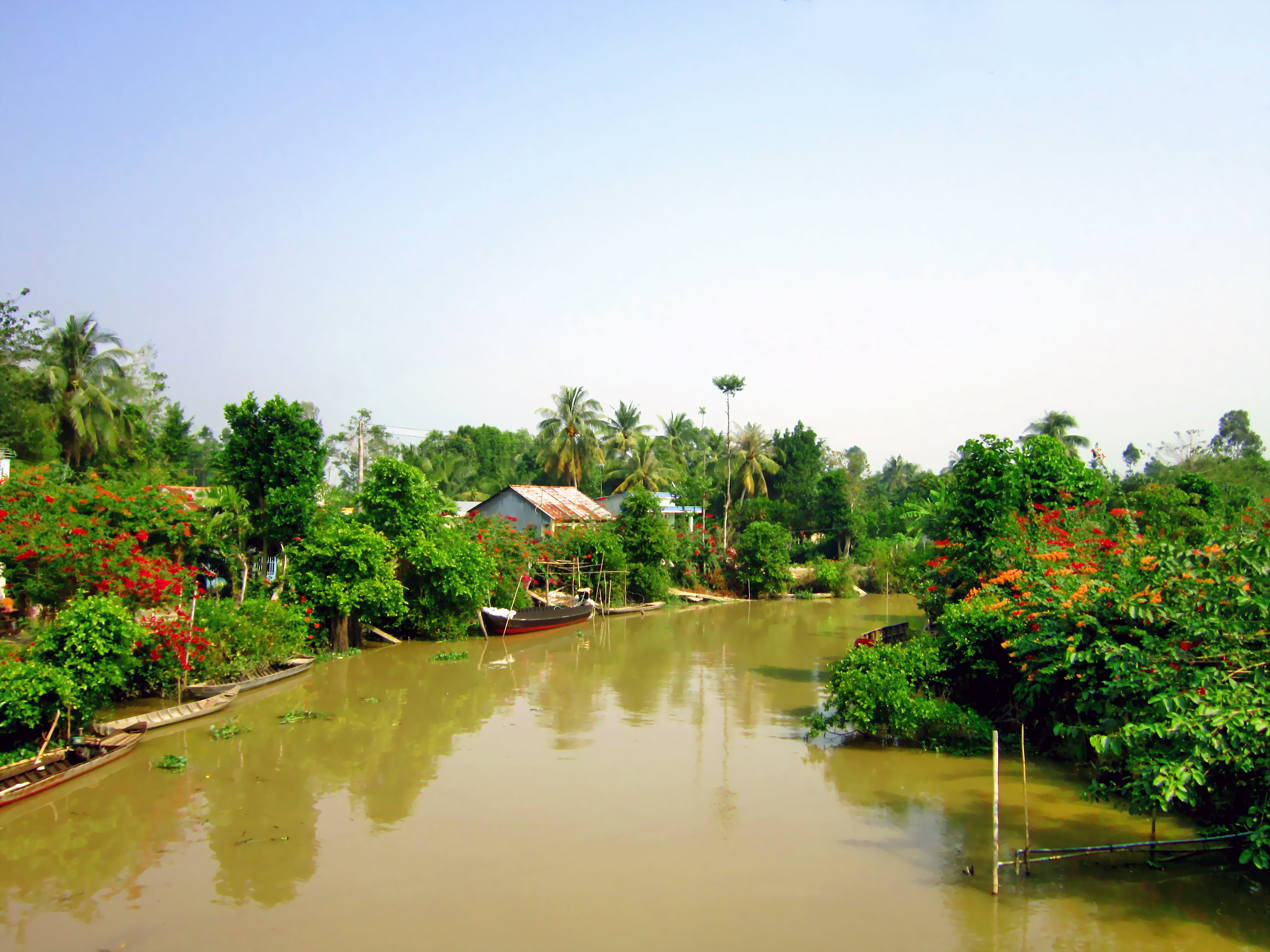
- Mù U canal in Tân Dương commune.
- Interactive map of Tân Dương
- Country: Vietnam
- Region: Mekong Delta
- Province: Đồng Tháp
- Establish: March 6, 1984
- Merger: June 16, 2026

Area
  - Total: 47 km^{2} (18 sq mi)

Population
  - Total: 46,069 people
  - Density: 980/km^{2} (2,500/sq mi)
- Website: http://tanduong.dongthap.gov.vn/

Tân Dương is a commune in Đồng Tháp province, Vietnam. It is one of 102 communes and wards in the province.

== Geography ==
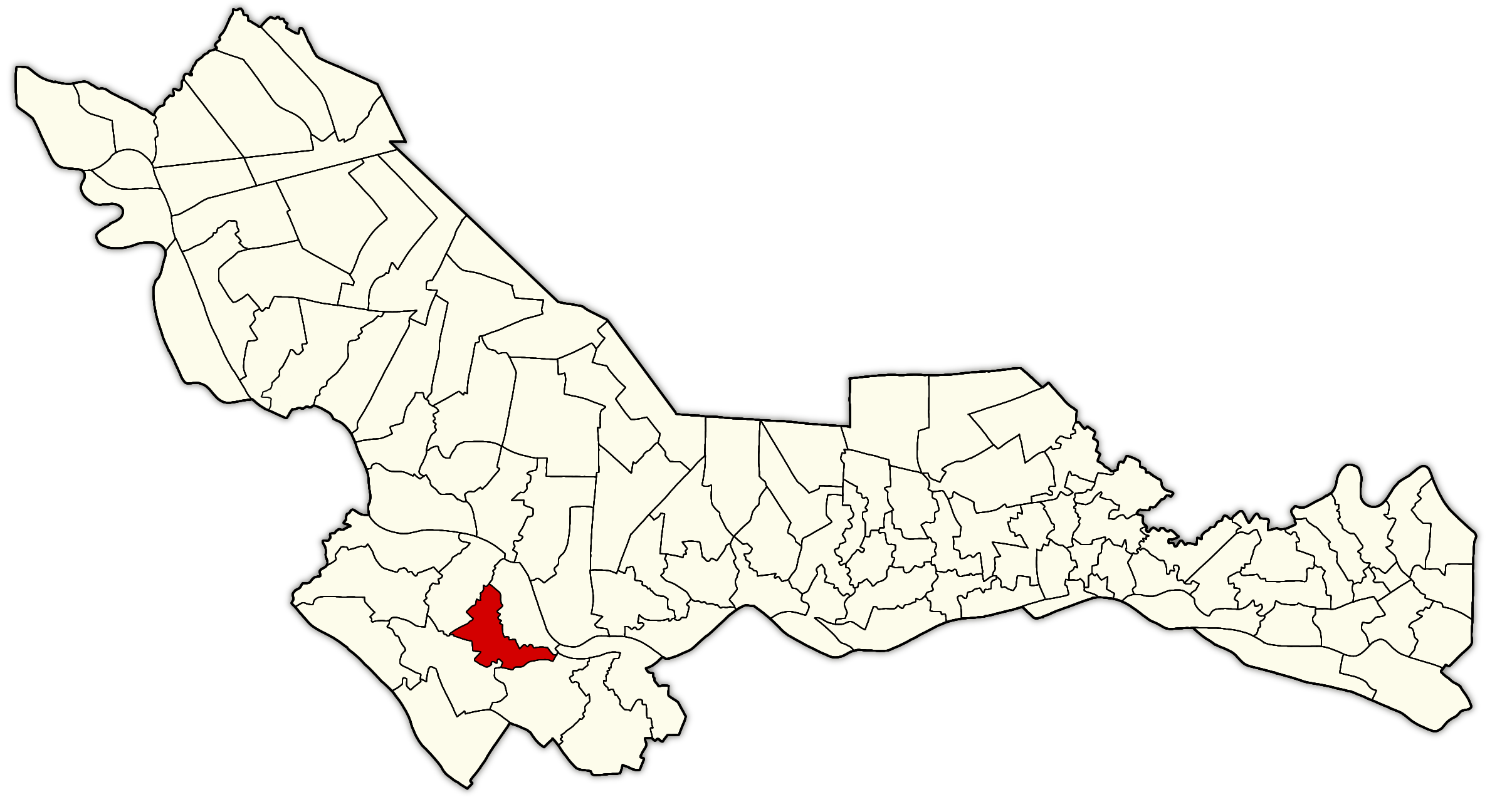
The map shows the location of Tân Dương commune, Đồng Tháp province (highlighted in red).

Tân Dương is a commune located in the southern part of Đồng Tháp province, 30 km southeast of Cao Lãnh ward and about 100 km west of Mỹ Tho ward.

- To the east, it borders Sa Đéc ward.
- To the south, it borders Tân Phú Trung commune.
- To the southwest, it borders Hòa Long commune.
- To the northwest, it borders Tân Khánh Trung commune.

== History ==
Before 2025, Tân Dương commune will comprise three communes: Tân Dương and Hòa Thành in Lai Vung district, and Tân Phú Đông in Sa Đéc city.

On June 12, 2025, the 15th National Assembly of Vietnam issued Resolution No. 202/2025/QH15 on the rearrangement of provincial-level administrative units. Accordingly:

- The Đồng Tháp province was established by merging the entire area and population of Đồng Tháp province and Tiền Giang province.

On June 16, 2025, the Standing Committee of the National Assembly of Vietnam issued Resolution No. 1663/NQ-UBTVQH15 on the rearrangement of commune-level administrative units in Đồng Tháp province in 2025. Accordingly:

- The commune of Tân Dương was established by merging the entire area and population of Tân Dương and Hòa Thành communes in Lai Vung district and Tân Phú Đông commune in Sa Đéc city (Excerpt from Clause 35, Article 1).
