= Sa Đéc Base =

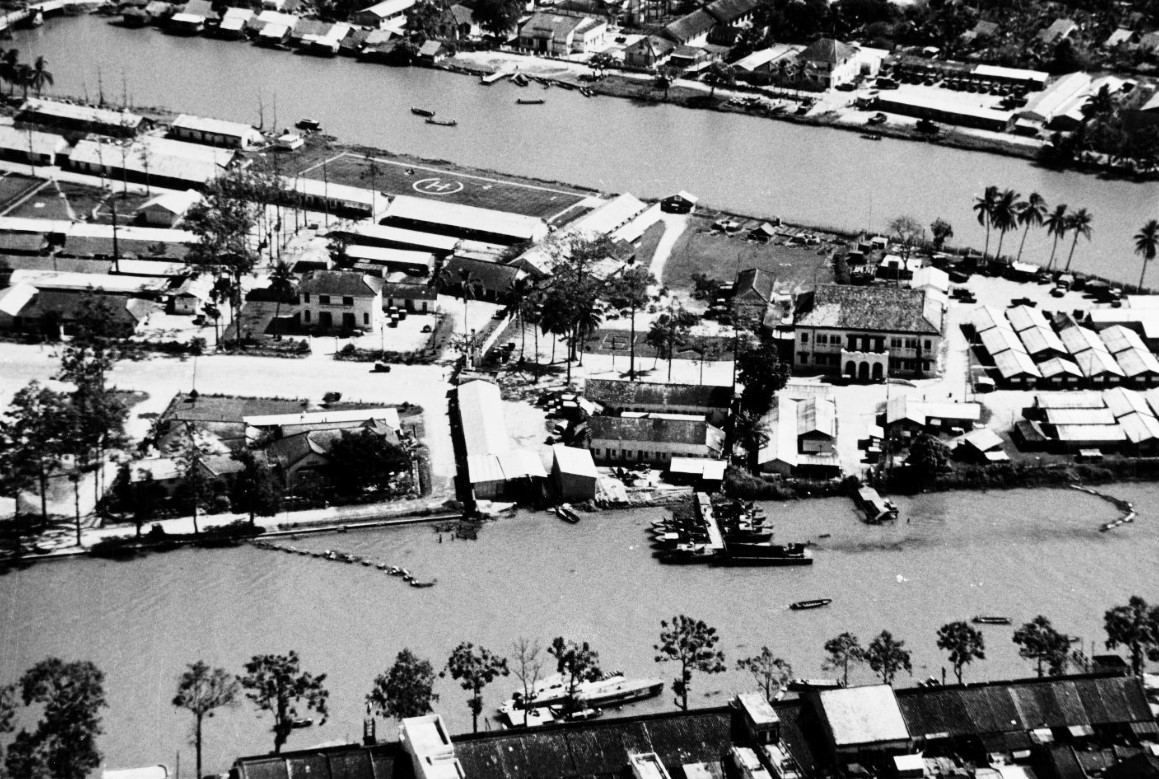
- Sa Đéc Base, 10 February 1967

Site information
- Type: Navy

Location
- Coordinates: 10.298°N 105.767°E

Site history
- Built: 1966
- In use: 1966–1971
- Battles/wars: Vietnam War

Sa Đéc Base (also known as Sa Đéc Naval Support Activity or simply Sa Đéc) is a former U.S. Navy and Republic of Vietnam Navy (RVNN) base near Sa Đéc in the Mekong Delta of Vietnam.

== History ==
The base was located in Sa Đéc on the upper Mỹ Tho River in the Mekong Delta.

The base was established by the US Navy in 1966 as a base for Patrol Boat, River (PBR)s taking part in Operation Game Warden. Ten PBRs of River Division 52 moved to the base in mid-1966. The original facilities at Sa Đéc were relatively primitive with the sailors living in tents on a soccer field until Seabees constructed more permanent accommodation.

In 1967 a Naval Support Activity detachment was established at the base.

In March 1970, the headquarters of Swift Boat Coastal Division 13 was moved from Cat Lo Naval Base to Sa Đéc.

The base was transferred to the RVNN in April 1971.
