= Lai Vung district =

Coordinates: 10.217°N 105.667°E

Lai Vung district Đức Thành district
- District
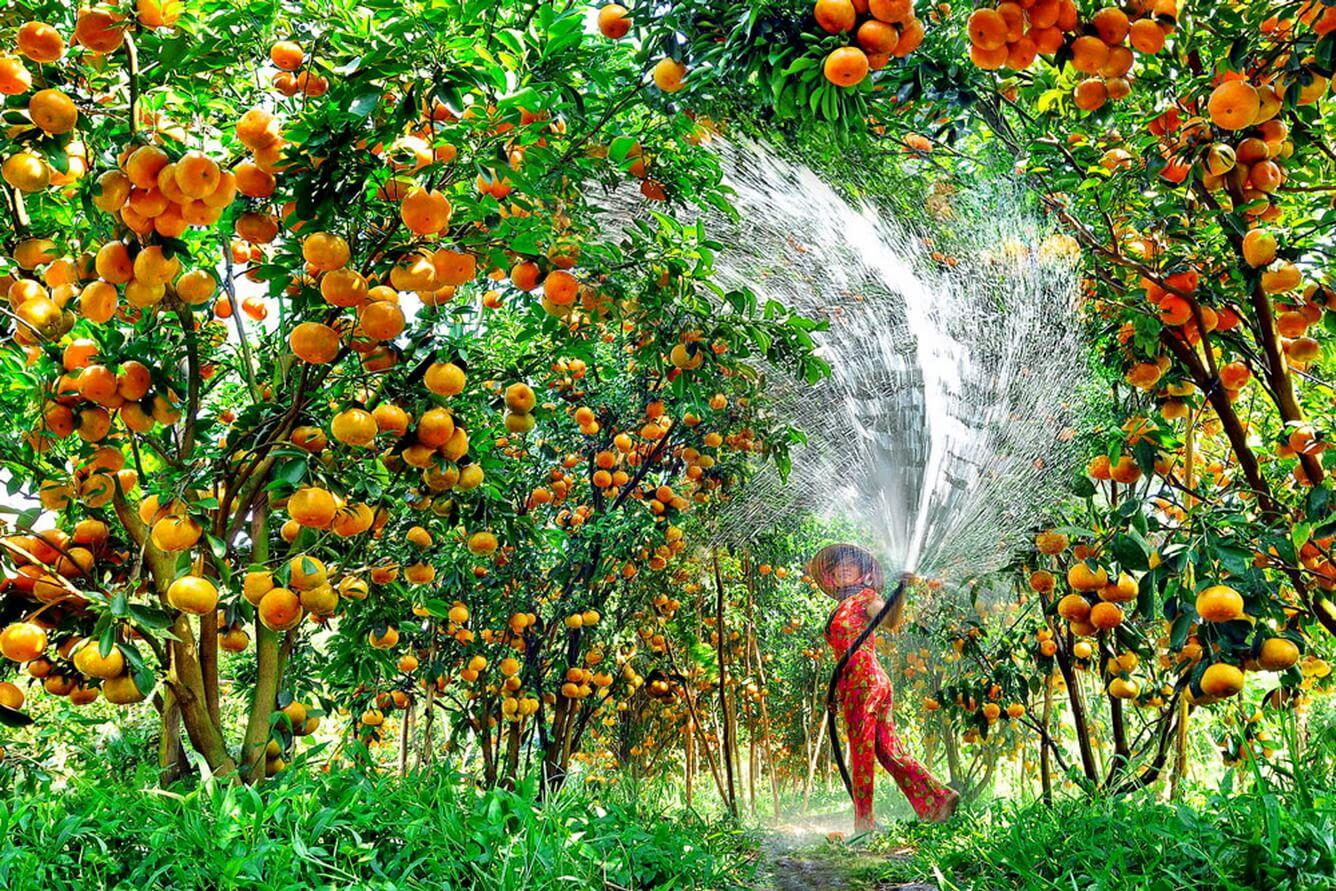
- mandarin oranges in Lai Vung
- Motto: Kingdom of Mandarin Oranges
- Interactive map of Lai Vung district
- Country: Vietnam
- Region: Mekong Delta
- Province: Đồng Tháp province
- Capital: Lai Vung town

Area
  - Total: 85 sq mi (219 km^{2})

Population (2019)
  - Total: 220,484
- Time zone: UTC+7 (Indochina Time)

Lai Vung is a former district of Đồng Tháp province, formally called Đức Thành District in Sa Đéc province in the Mekong Delta region of Vietnam. This place was dubbed the "Kingdom of Mandarin Oranges".

As of 2003 the district had a population of 160,125. The district covers an area of 220 km^{2} (85 sq mi). The district capital lies at Lai Vung township. This district is famous for its Lai Vung mandarin orange which usually ripens during the Tết holiday season and for the master boat craftsmen in Long Hậu commune. Other specialities are Nem Lai Vung - a kind of fermented pork - and Phong Hòa pomelo.

== Geographical location ==
Lai Vung is located 12.3 km (7.6 mi) WSW of Sa Đéc, 24.9 km (15.5 mi) S of Cao Lãnh, 26.5 km (16.5 mi) NNW of Cần Thơ and 29.4 km (18.3 mi) SE of Long Xuyên.

== Economy ==
=== Sông Hậu Industrial Park ===
Sông Hậu Industrial Park is located in Tân Thành commune, with a planned area of 66,336 ha (163,920 acres), very convenient for transportation; the road is bordered by National Highway 54, the waterway is adjacent to the Hậu River and is located near other urban centers such as Cần Thơ (30 km; 19 mi), Long Xuyên (20 km; 12 mi), Cao Lãnh (30 km; 19 mi), Mỹ Thới port (16 km; 9.9 mi) and Cần Thơ port (20 km; 12 mi).

== Divisions ==
The district is divided into 1 township and 11 communes:

- Township
  - Capital of Lai Vung District: Lai Vung
- Communes
  - Phong Hòa, Định Hòa, Tân Hòa, Vĩnh Thới, Long Thắng, Hòa Long, Tân Thành, Tân Phước, Long Hậu, Tân Dương and Hòa Thành
