= Hòa Long =

Coordinates: 10.1723°N 105.3918°E

- Commune
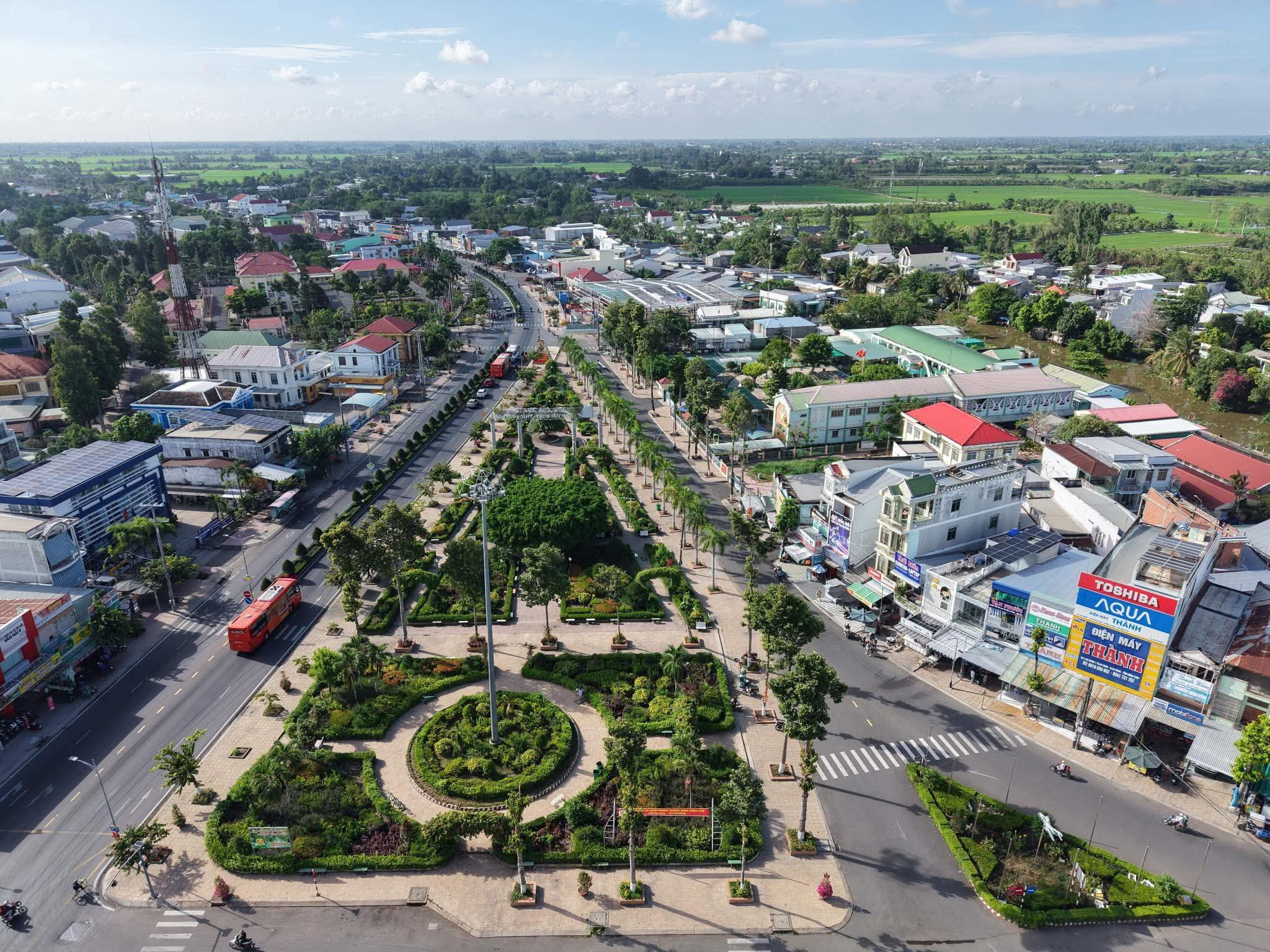
- Hòa Long commune center
- Interactive map of Hòa Long
- Country: Vietnam
- Region: Mekong Delta
- Province: Đồng Tháp
- Establish: June 16, 2025

Area
  - Total: 81 km^{2} (31 sq mi)

Population (2024)
  - Total: 68,886 people
  - Density: 850/km^{2} (2,200/sq mi)
- Time zone: UTC+7 (UTC + 7)

Hòa Long is a commune of Đồng Tháp province, Vietnam. This is one of the 102 communes and wards in the province after the meger in 2025.

== Geography ==
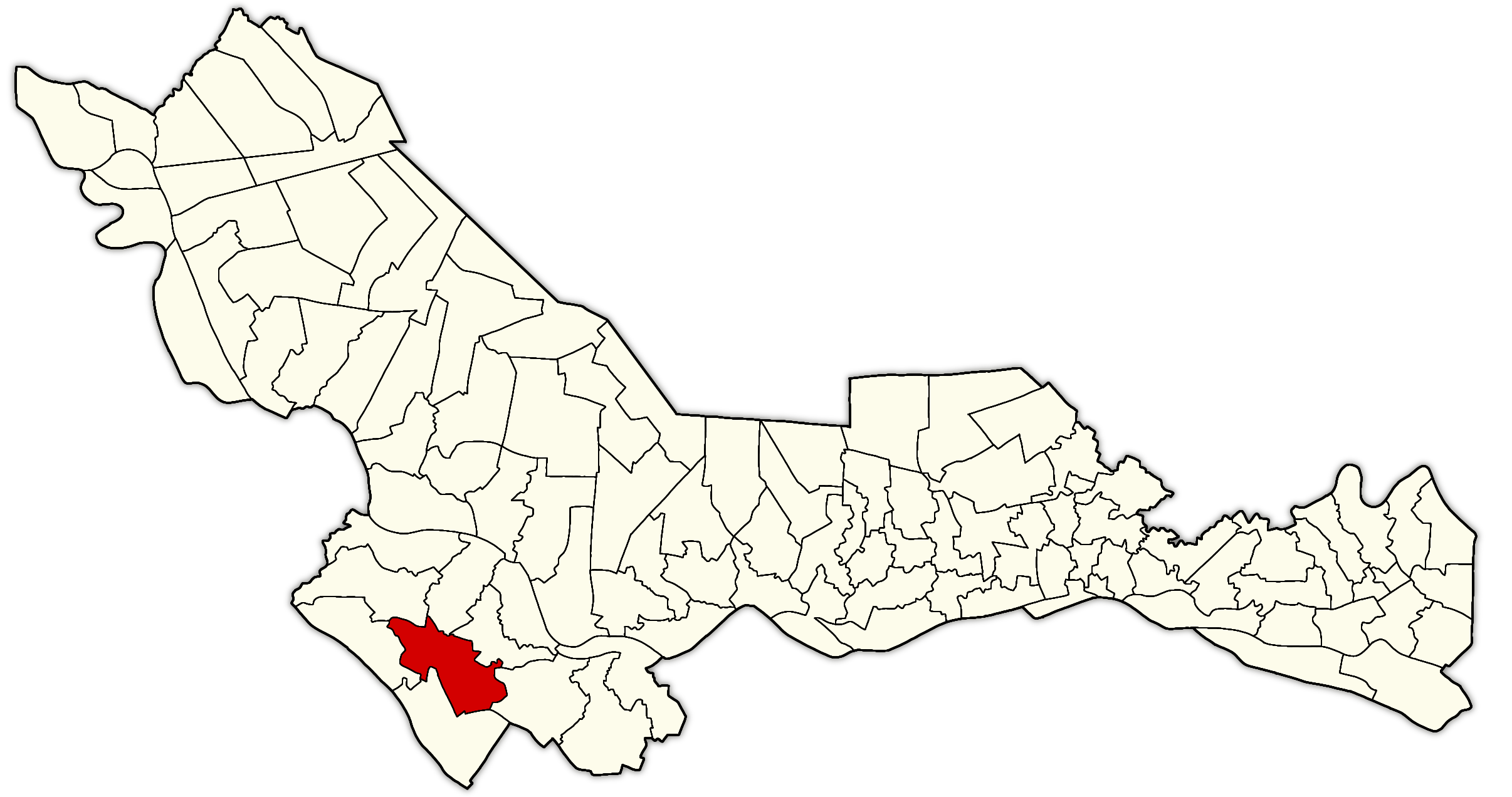
The map shows the location of Hòa Long commune in Đồng Tháp province (highlighted in red).

Hòa Long is a commune located in the southern part of Đồng Tháp province. The commune has the following geographical location:

- To the north, it borders Lấp Vò ward and Tân Khánh Trung commune.
- To the east, it borders Tân Dương commune and Tân Phú Trung commune.
- To the south, it borders Phong Hòa commune.
- To the west, it borders Lai Vung commune.
