= Cao Lãnh, Đồng Tháp =

Ward in Đồng Tháp province, Vietnam

Cao Lãnh
- Ward
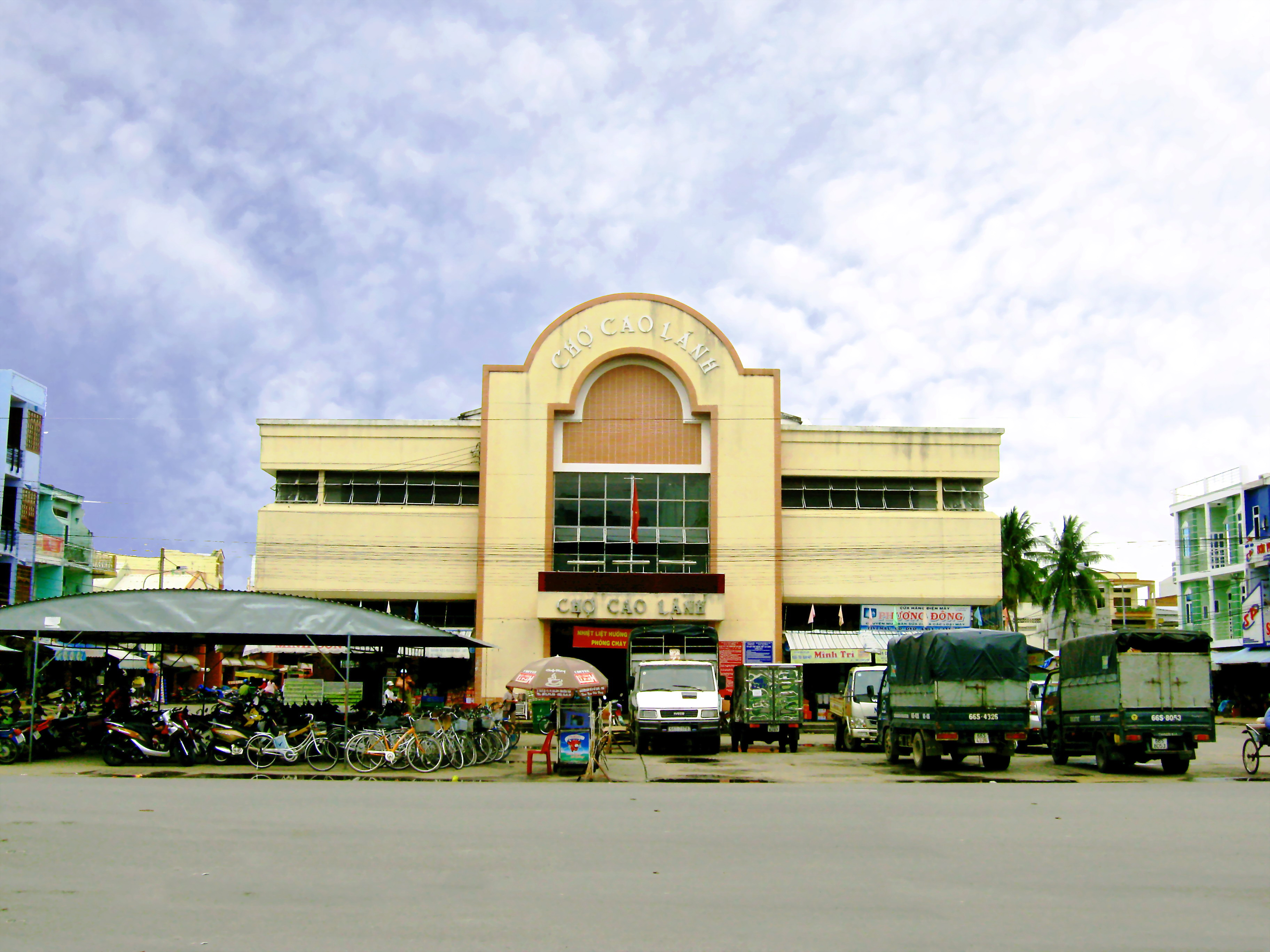
- Cao Lãnh Market
- Interactive map of Cao Lãnh
- Coordinates: 10°27′24″N 105°38′13″E
- Country: Vietnam
- Province: Đồng Tháp province
- Established: June 16, 2025

Area
  - Total: 28.31 sq mi (73.33 km^{2})

Population (2024)
  - Total: 137,387
  - Density: 4,852/sq mi (1,874/km^{2})
- Time zone: UTC+07:00 (Indochina Time)
- Administrative code: 29869

Cao Lãnh is a ward of Đồng Tháp province, Vietnam. It is one of the 102 new wards, communes of the province following the reorganization in 2025.

== Geography ==
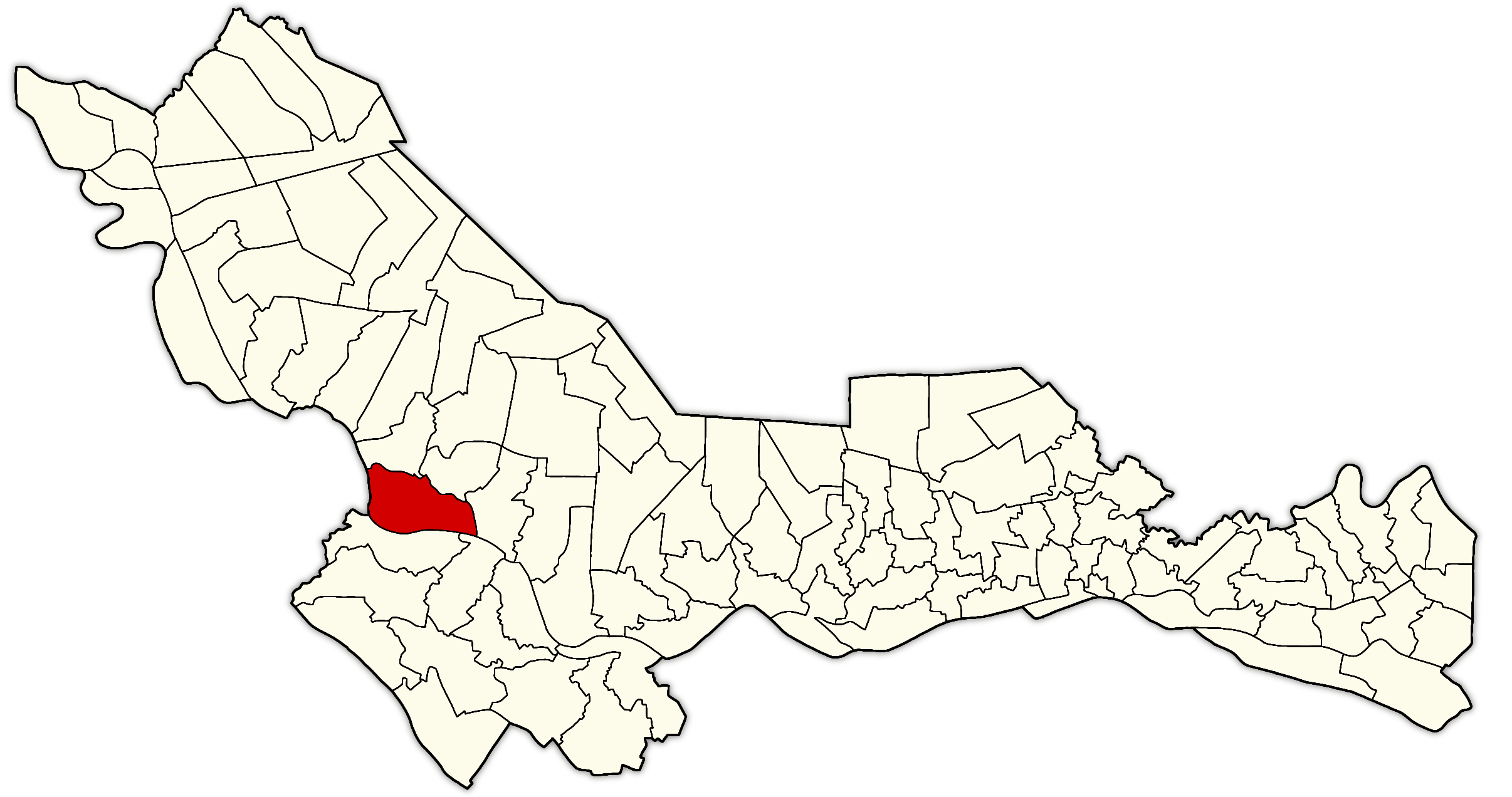
The map shows the location of Cao Lãnh ward, Đồng Tháp province (highlight in red).

Cao Lãnh is a ward located in the western part of Đồng Tháp province, 100km west of Mỹ Tho ward and 30km northwest of Sa Đéc ward.

- To the east, it borders Mỹ Thọ commune.
- To the north, it borders two wards: Mỹ Trà and Mỹ Ngãi.
- To the west, it borders An Giang province.
- To the south, it borders the two communes of Tân Khánh Trung and Mỹ An Hưng.

== Origin of the place name ==
The name Cao Lãnh originates from the earlier term “Câu Lãnh,” in which “Câu” refers to the old village title “câu đương,” a local official responsible for assisting with minor legal matters, maintaining order, and carrying out administrative tasks, while “Lãnh” was the personal name of a man named Đỗ Công Tường; people therefore called him “Ông Câu Lãnh” (Mr. Lãnh, the câu đương), and the market he established became known as “Chợ Câu Lãnh,” which over time was gradually transformed in pronunciation into “Cao Lãnh,” eventually becoming the official name of the area.

== History ==
On June 16, 2025, the National Assembly Standing Committee issued Resolution No. 1663/NQ-UBTVQH15 on the arrangement of commune-level administrative units of Đồng Tháp province in 2025 (effective from June 16, 2025). Accordingly, the entire land area and population of Ward 1, Ward 3, Ward 4, Ward 6, Hòa Thuận ward and Hòa An, Tịnh Thới, Tân Thuận Tây, Tân Thuận Đông communes of the former Cao Lãnh city will be integrated into a new ward named Cao Lãnh (Clause 95, Article 1).
