= Sa Đéc (city) =

Former provincial city of Đồng Tháp province, Vietnam

- Provincial city (Class-2)
- Sa Đéc City; Thành phố Sa Đéc
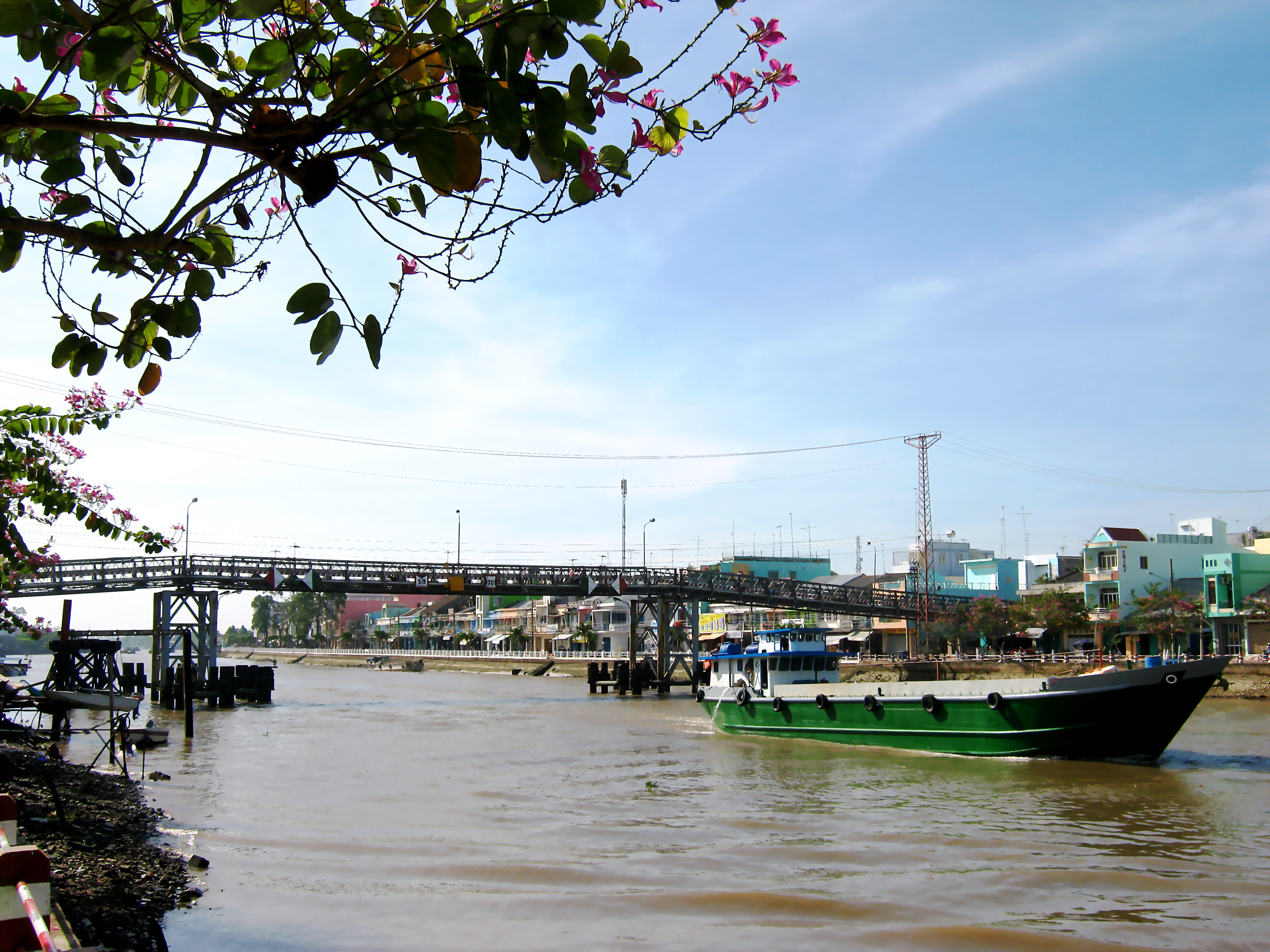
- Sa Đéc river, near Sa Đéc market
- Nickname: Flower Capital of the Mekong Delta
- Interactive map of Sa Đéc
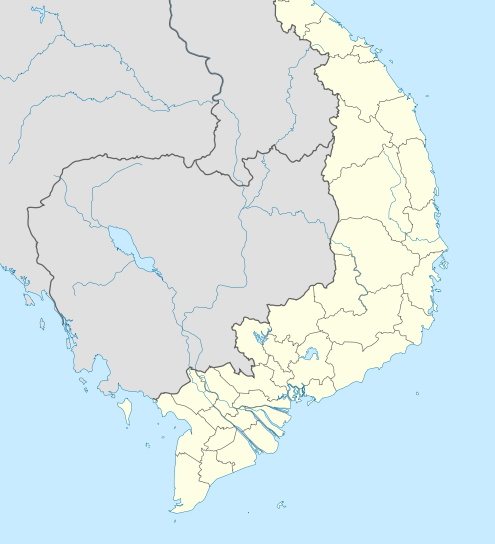
- Location within South Vietnam
- Coordinates: 10°18′00″N 105°46′0.12″E
- Country: Vietnam
- Province: Đồng Tháp
- Establish: February 24th, 1976
- Become a provincial city: October 14th, 2013
- Dissolution: July 1st, 2025

Government
  - Mayor: Phan Văn Nhiều

Area
  - Total: 60 km^{2} (23 sq mi)

Population (2019)
  - Total: 214,610
  - Density: 3,600/km^{2} (9,300/sq mi)
- Registered residents only
- Time zone: UTC+7 (Indochina Time)
- Website: http://sadec.dongthap.gov.vn

Sa Đéc is a former provincial city in Đồng Tháp province in the Mekong Delta of southern Vietnam. It is a river port and agricultural and industrial trading center. The Sa Đéc economic zone consists of Châu Thành, Lai Vung and Lấp Vò districts. The area of the former Sa Đéc provincial city corresponds to Sa Đéc ward and part of Tân Dương commune in Đồng Tháp province.

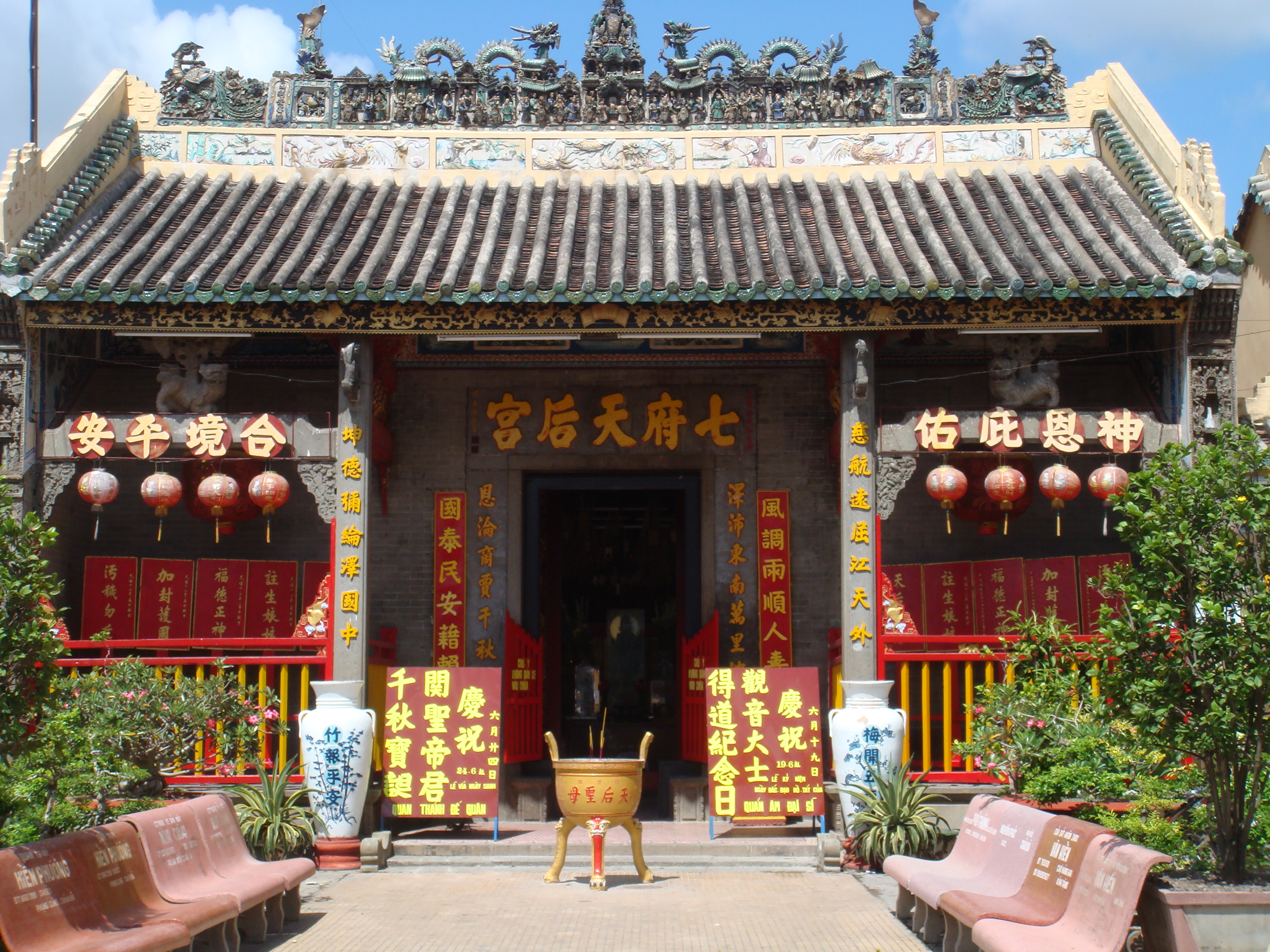
Thiên Hậu Temple

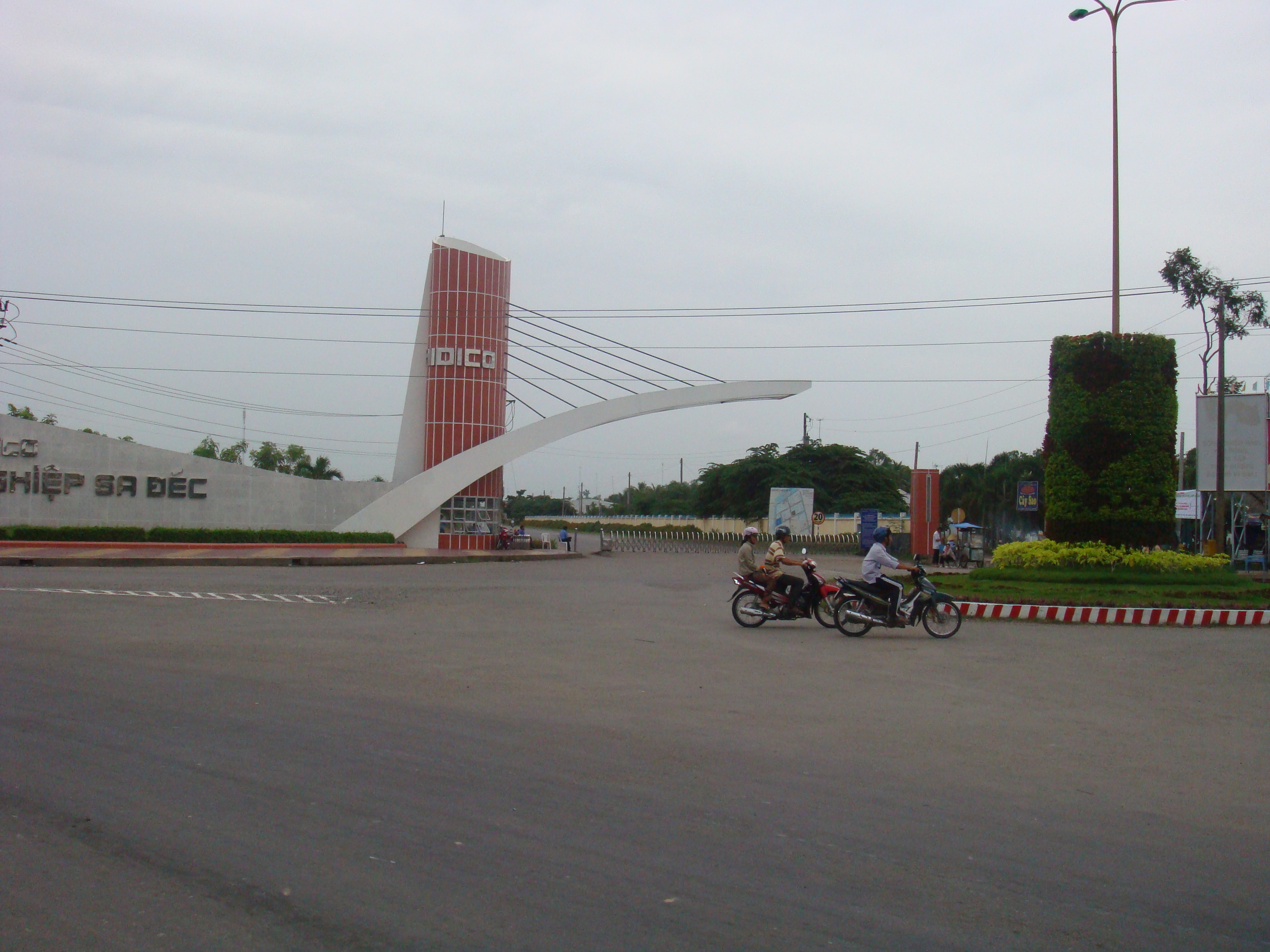
Sa Đéc Industrial zone

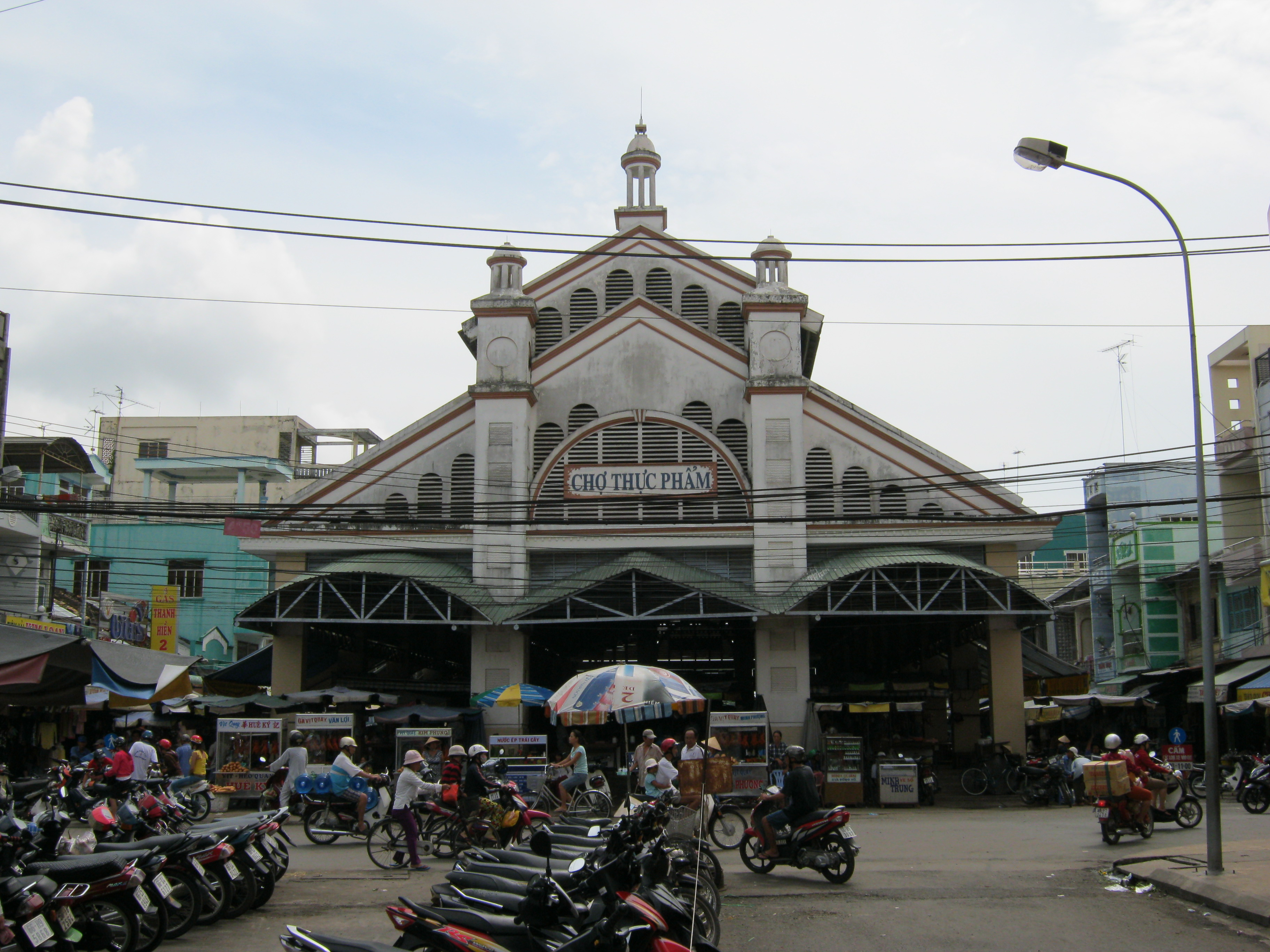
Sa Đéc market

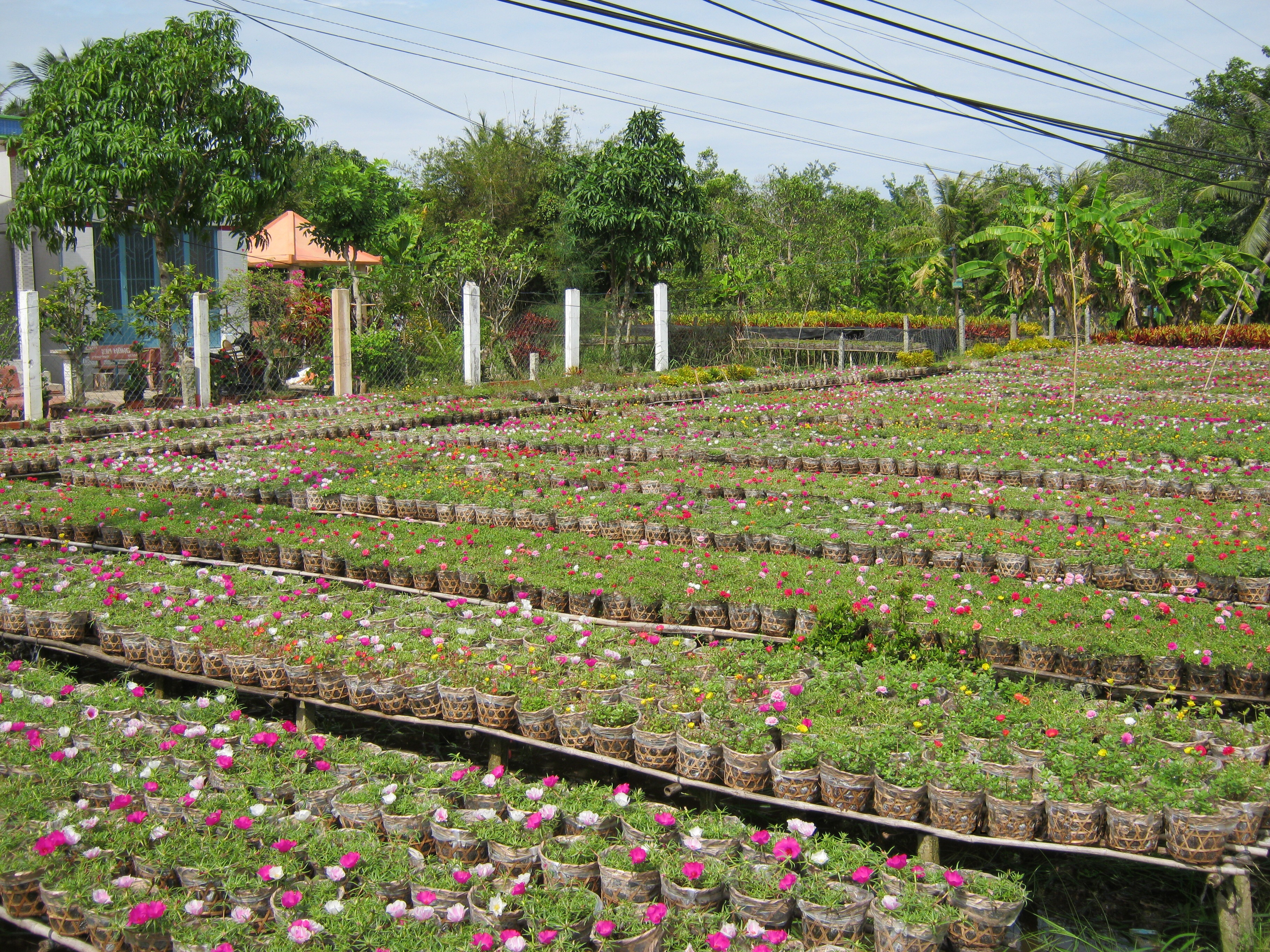
Sa Đéc Flower Village

As of January 2018, the city has a population of approximately 202,046. There are three industrial zones, designated by the codes A, C1, and C. They attract many business people from the Mekong Delta region.

== History ==
In February 1976, Sa Đéc province was merged with Kiến Phong province to form Đồng Tháp province. Sa Đéc district-level town was initially the provincial capital of Đồng Tháp province until April 29, 1994. Then the provincial capital was moved to Cao Lãnh town.

Sa Đéc town originally had 5 communes including: Vĩnh Phước, Tân Quy Tây, Tân Quy Đông, Tân Phú Đông, Tân Hưng

On June 10, 1981, the Council of Ministers issued resolution No. 62-HĐBT on the establishment of new communes and wards in Sa Đéc town, Đồng Tháp province.

• Dissolution of Vĩnh Phước, Tân Quy Đông, Tân Phú Đông, Tân Hưng commune

1. Establish Ward 1 consisting of four hamlets: 1, 2, 3, 4 (formerly known as hamlets: Vĩnh Hiệp, Vĩnh Thuận, Vĩnh Thới, Tân Bình)
2. Establish Ward 2 consisting of three hamlets: 1, 2, 3 (formerly known as hamlets: Hoà Khánh, Phú Mỹ and part of Phú Thuận hamlet)
3. Establish Ward 3 including hamlets: 1, 2, 3 (formerly part of Tân Long hamlet)
4. Establish Ward 4 including 2 hamlets: 1, 2 (formerly known as hamlets: Tân Hưng, An Thuận)
5. Establishment of Tân Quy Tây commune including 2 hamlets Tân An, Tân Hoà and part of the old Vĩnh Phước commune.
6. Establishment of Tân Quy Đông commune including 3 hamlets: Sa Nhiên, Tân Mỹ 1 and Tân Mỹ 2
7. Establishment of Tân Phú Đông commune including 3 hamlets: Phú Long, Phú Thuận, Phú Hoà.

After establishing new wards and communes, Sa Đéc town has 7 administrative units, including: wards 1, 2, 3, 4, and 3 communes Tân Quy Tây, Tân Quy Đông, Tân Phú Đông.

On February 16, 1987, the Council of Ministers issued resolution No. 36-HĐBT on adjusting the administrative boundaries of Sa Đéc town, Đồng Tháp province:

• Split Tân Huề and Tân Lợi hamlets, including 890 hectares of natural land and 4,508 people of Tân Dương commune, Thạnh Hưng district.

• Three island of Cát Sậy and Bồng Bồng, 152 hectares and 505 people of Bình Hàng Trung commune, Cao Lãnh district, into Sa Đéc town.

Sa Đéc town consists of 4 wards, 3 communes, has 4,005 hectares of land area with 72,670 people.

After the merger, Sa Đéc is territory borders:

1. South borders Châu Thành district.
2. West and Northwest border Thạnh Hưng district.
3. East and North border Cao Lãnh district.

On April 29, 1994, the Vietnam government issued resolution No. 36-CP on moving the provincial capital of Đồng Tháp province from Sa Đéc town to Cao Lãnh town.

On November 29, 2004, the Vietnamese government issued decree No. 194/2004 NĐ-CP on the establishment of new wards in Sa Dec town.

1. Establish Tân Quy Đông ward on the basis of the entire area and population size of the old Tân Quy Đông commune.
2. Establish An Hòa ward on the basis of separating 641.10 hectares of land and 7,490 people of Tân Quy Tây commune.

After the arrangement of administrative units, Sa Đéc town has 9 administrative units including: wards 1, 2, 3, 4, An Hòa, Tân Quy Đông and 3 communes Tân Quy Tây, Tân Khánh Đông, Tân Phú Đông.

Sa Đéc town boundary:

• South borders Châu Thành district.

• West borders Lai Vung district.

• North of the Lấp Vò district.

• The East borders the Cao Lãnh district separated by the Tiền river.

December 15, 2005, Sa Đéc town was recognized as a type III urban area.

On October 14, 2013, the Vietnam government issued resolution No. 113/NQ-CP on the establishment of Sa Đéc city in Đồng Tháp province on the basis of the entire area and population size of the old Sa Đéc town.

On February 10, 2018, Sa Đéc city was recognized as a type II urban area and was the first city under Đồng Tháp province to be recognized as a type II urban area.

On July 1, 2025, The Standing Committee of the National Assembly issued resolution No. 1663/NQ-UBTVQH15 on the arrangement of commune-level administrative units of Đồng Tháp province in 2025.

Accordingly, Sa Đéc city is divided into two new administrative units:

1. Establish Sa Đéc ward on the basis of merging the entire area and population size of wards: 1, 2, 3, 4, An Hòa, Tân Quy Đông, communes Tân Quy Tây, Tân Khánh Đông. The People's Committee headquarters is located at the old Sa Đéc City People's Committee, address is 530A, Nguyễn Sinh Sắc, Sa Đéc Ward, Đồng Tháp province.
2. Establish Tân Dương commune on the basis of merging the entire area and population size of the communes: Tân Dương, Hoà Thành of the old Lai Vung district and Tân Phú Đông commune of Sa Đéc city. The commune People's Committee is located at the old Hòa Thành commune People's Committee. Address is National Highway 80, Tân Dương commune, Đồng Tháp province.

Since then, Sa Đéc city was officially dissolved.

== Geography ==
Sa Đéc has 9 subordinate administrative units:

- Wards
1. Ward 1
2. Ward 2
3. Ward 3
4. Ward 4
5. An Hòa
6. Tân Quy Đông
- Communes
1. Tân Khánh Đông
2. Tân Phú Đông
3. Tân Quy Tây

== Economy ==
- Sa Đéc Industrial Park
- Sa Đéc port

== In literature ==
The French writer Marguerite Duras lived in Sa Đéc during the three- to four-year period between 1928 and 1932. Her mother ran a school on the corner of Hùng Vương and Hồ Xuân Hương streets, where a school still exists today (now it is Trưng Vương Primary School). Duras met Huỳnh Thủy Lê, the son of a wealthy Chinese family, and the two became involved in a love affair that became the basis for Duras's 1984 Prix Goncourt-winning novel, The Lover. The house of Huỳnh Thủy Lê, at 255A Nguyễn Huệ Street, for many years an office for a government agency, has from 2007 been open to the public, with guides offering tours in French, English and Vietnamese.
