= Sa Đéc, Đồng Tháp =

Ward in Đồng Tháp province, Vietnam

Sa Đéc
- Ward
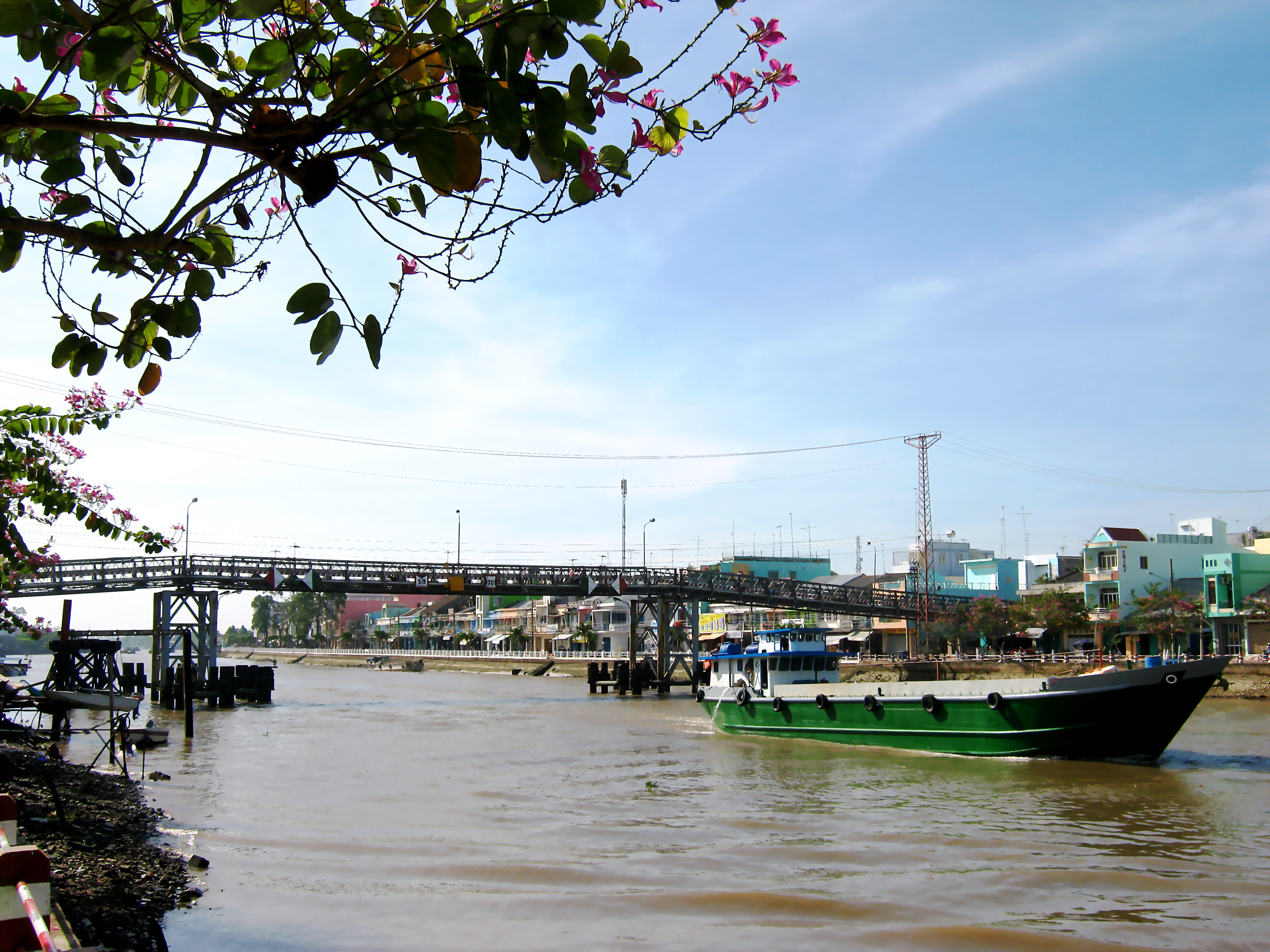
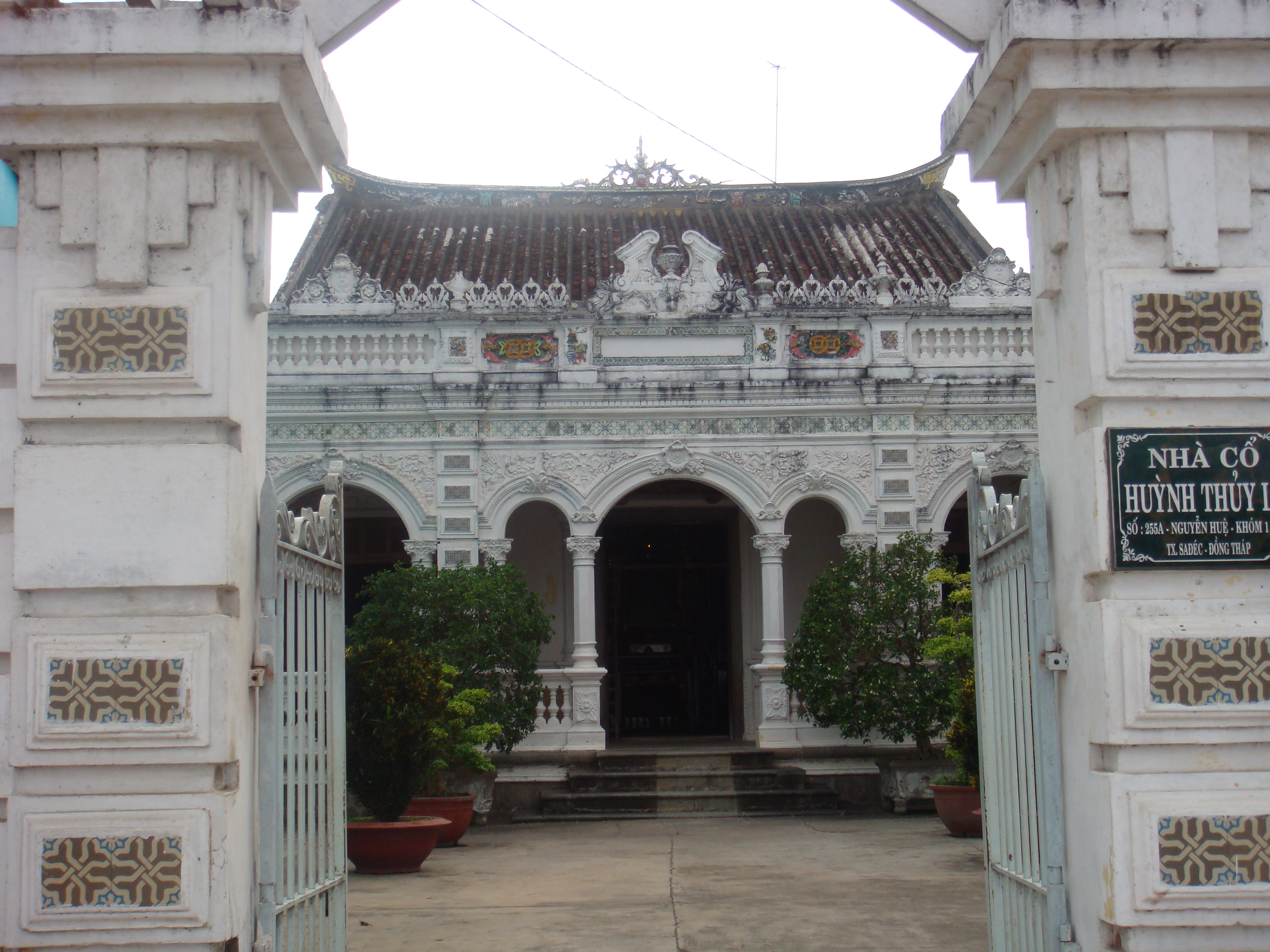
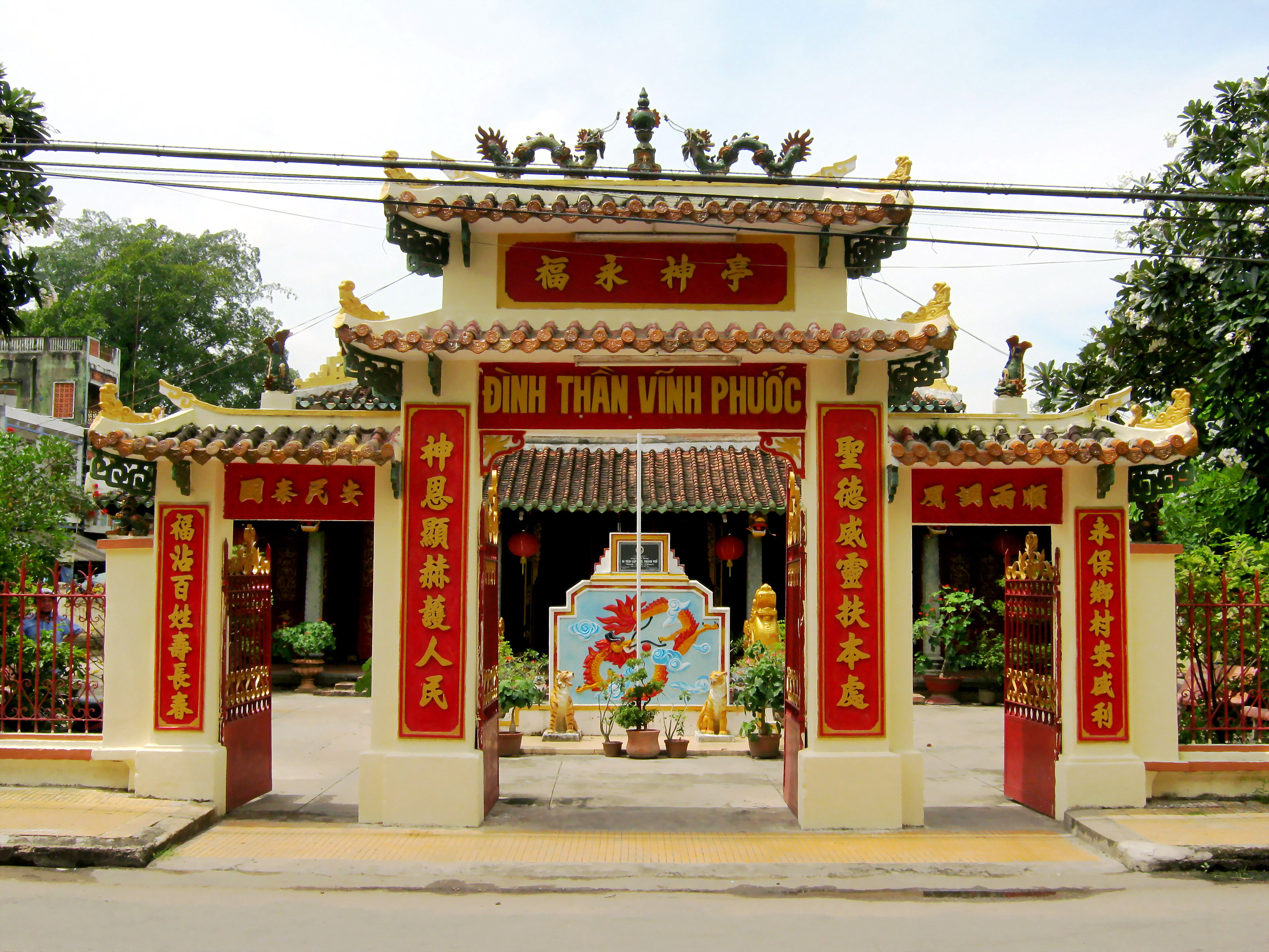
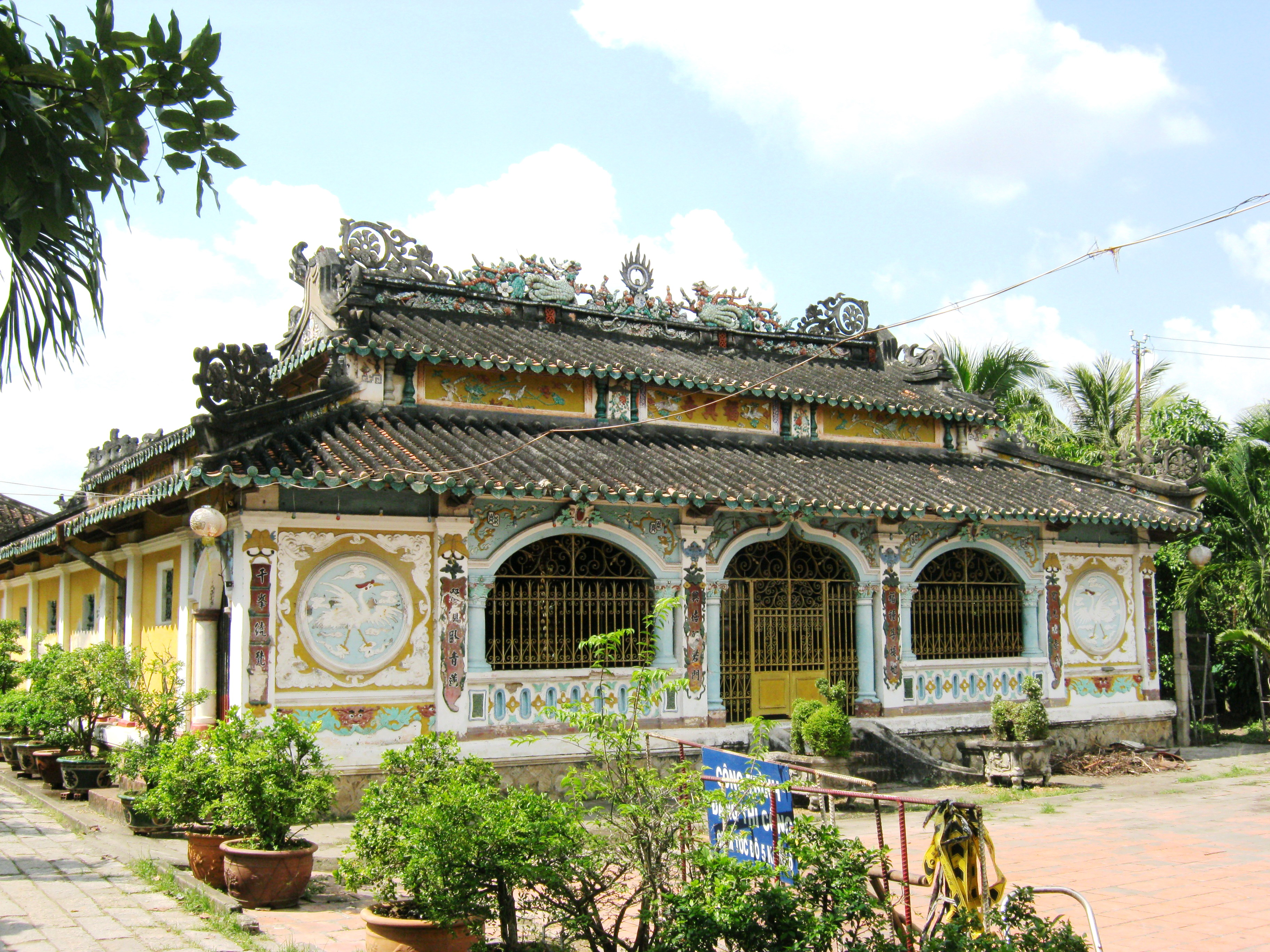
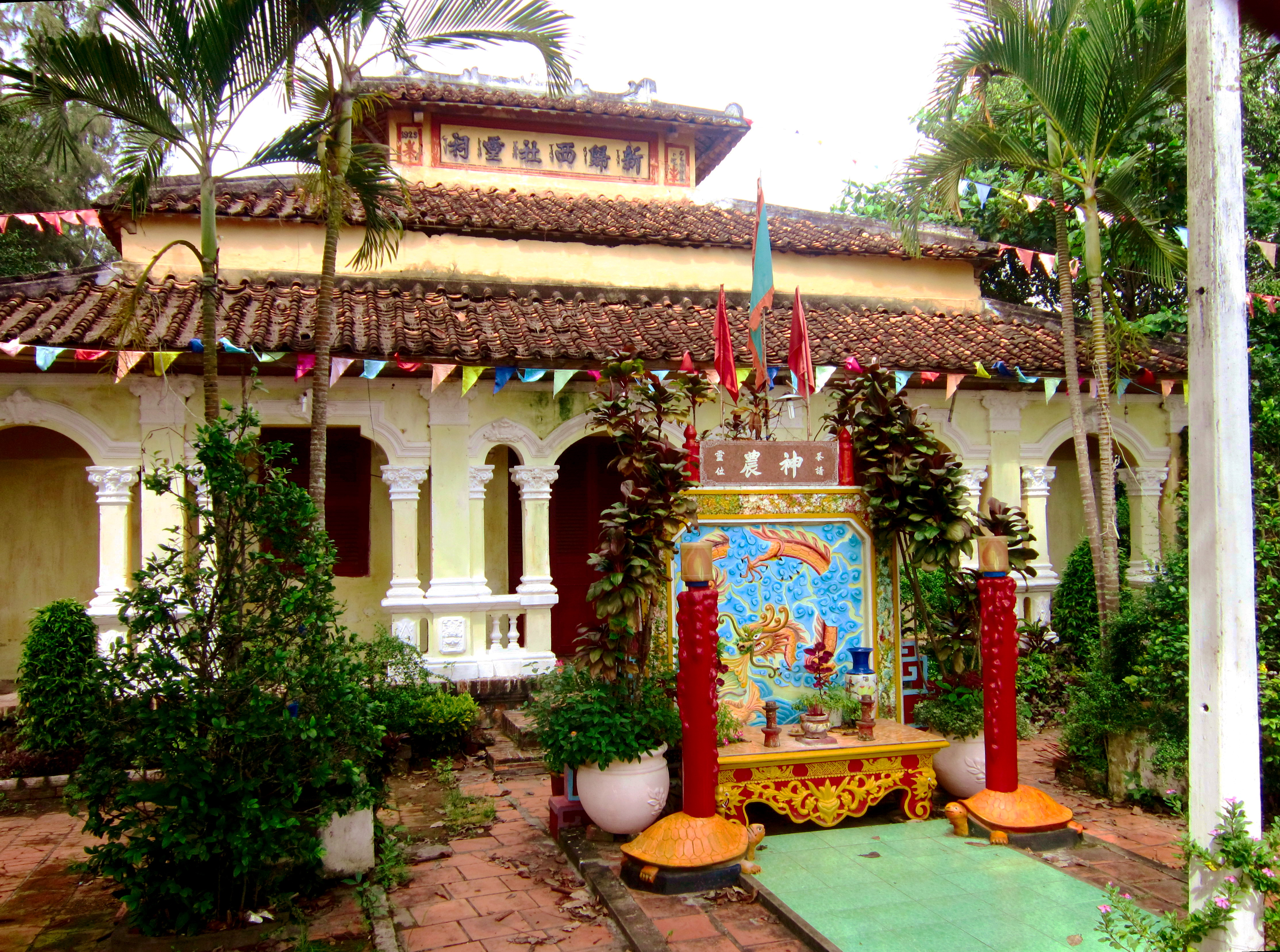
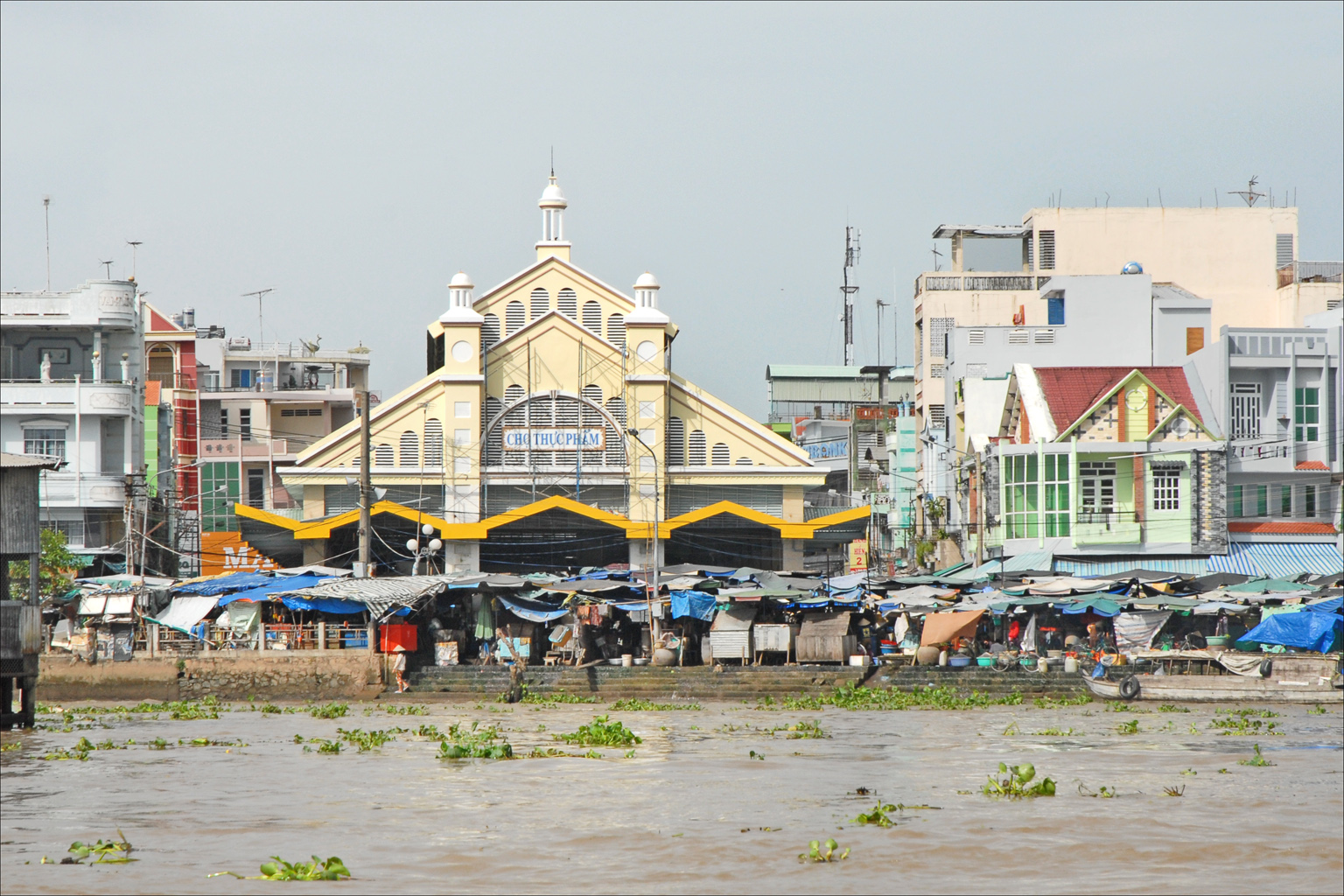
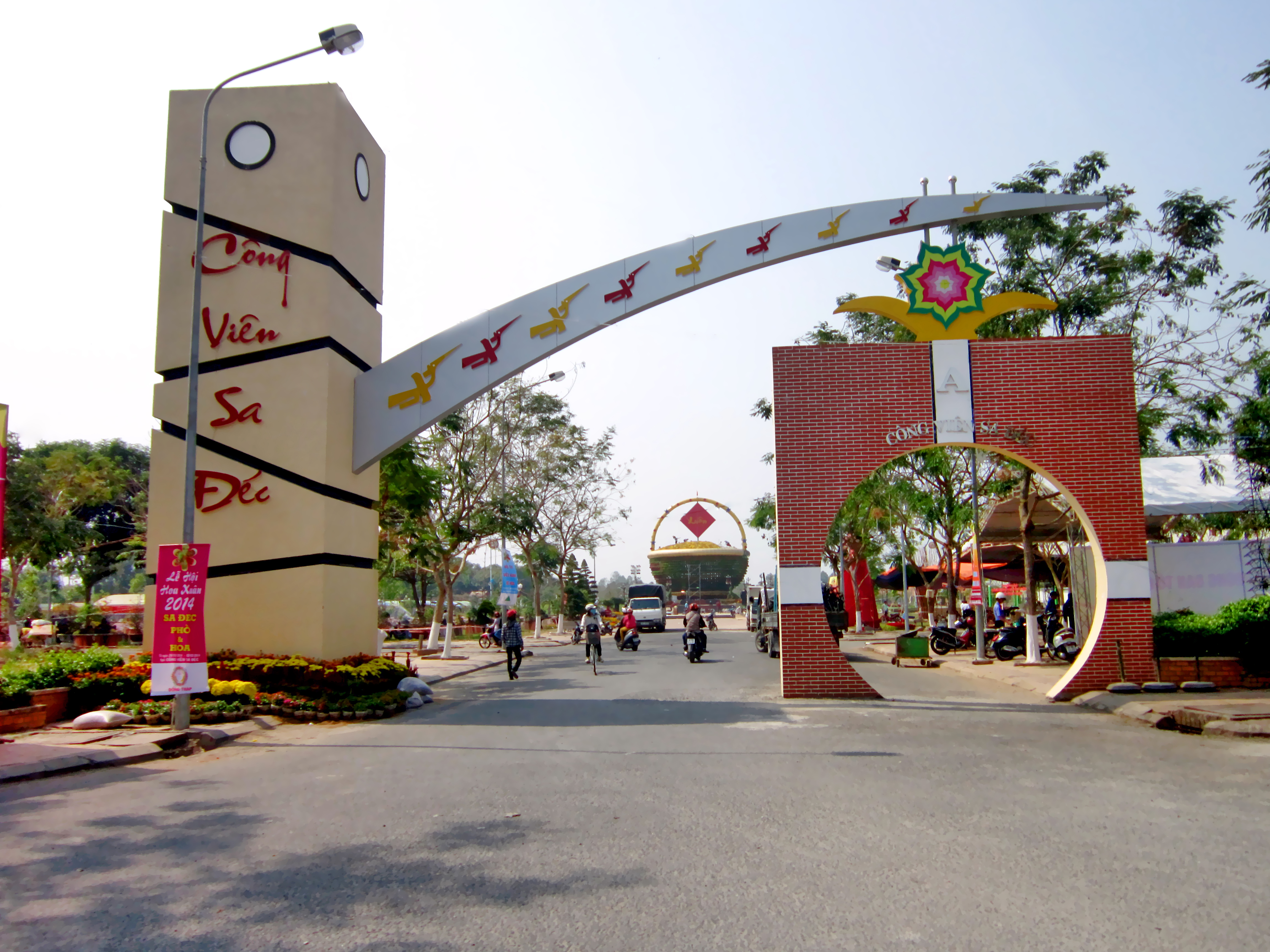
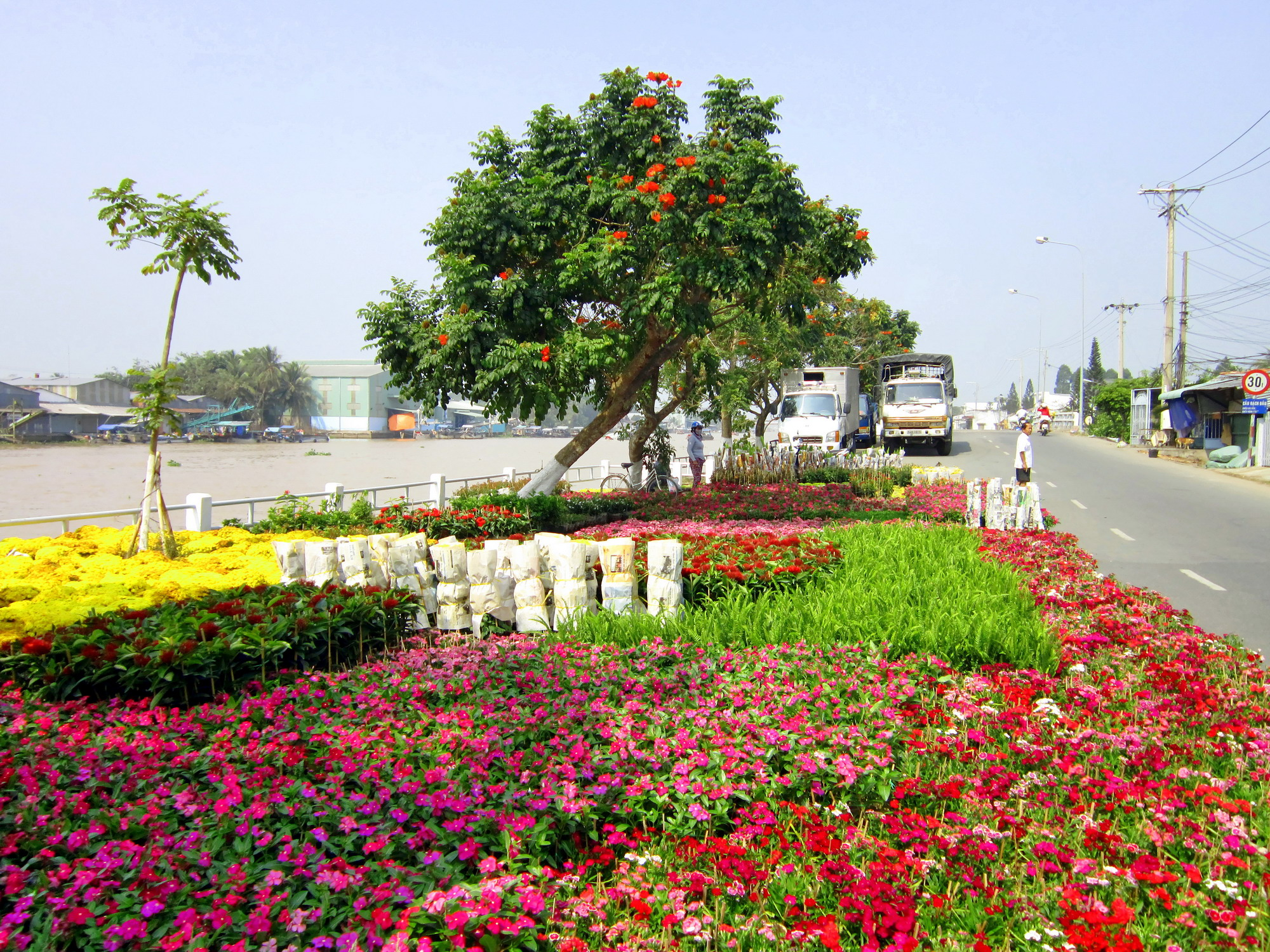
- From left to right, top to bottom: Sắt Quay bridge over Sa Đéc river, Huỳnh Thủy Lê ancient house, Vĩnh Phước temple, Phước Hưng pagoda, Tân Quy Tây temple, Sa Đéc market, Sa Đéc park, Flowers in Sa Đéc Flower Village.
- Nickname: The flower capital of the Mekong Delta
- Interactive map of Sa Đéc
- Coordinates: 10°17′32″N 105°46′01″E
- Country: Vietnam
- Province: Đồng Tháp province
- Established: June 16, 2025

Area
  - Total: 18.12 sq mi (46.92 km^{2})

Population (2024)
  - Total: 104,509
  - Density: 5,769/sq mi (2,227/km^{2})
- Time zone: UTC+07:00 (Indochina Time)
- Administrative code: 29905
- Website: http://sadec.dongthap.gov.vn/

Sa Đéc is a ward of Đồng Tháp province, Vietnam. It is one of the 102 wards, communes of the province following the reorganization in 2025.

== Geography ==
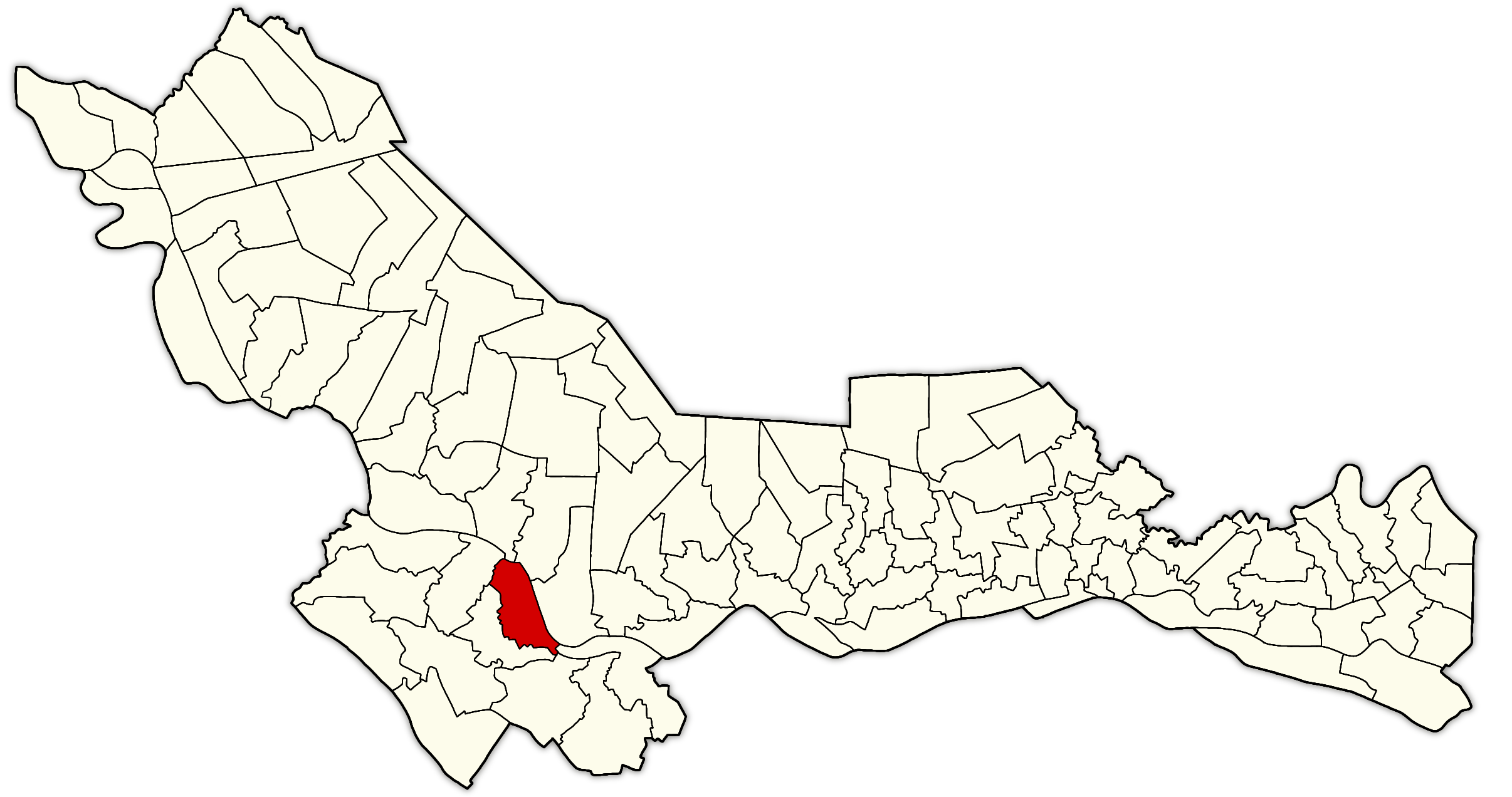
Location of Sa Đéc ward on the map of Đồng Tháp province (highlighted in red)

Sa Đéc is a ward located in the southern part of Đồng Tháp province, about 30km southeast of Cao Lãnh ward and 100km west of Mỹ Tho ward.

- To the north, it borders Bình Hàng Trung commune, Mỹ Thọ ward and Tân Khánh Trung commune.
- To the west and south, it borders Tân Dương commune.
- To the east, it borders Mỹ Hiệp commune across the Tiền River.
- To the southeast, it borders Tân Phú Trung commune and Phú Hựu commune.

According to Official Letter No. 2896/BNV-CQĐP dated May 27, 2025, from the Ministry of Interior, the reorganized Sa Đéc ward will have an area of 46.9 km² and a population of 104,509 people as of December 31, 2024.

== History ==
On June 16, 2025, the National Assembly Standing Committee issued Resolution No. 1663/NQ-UBTVQH15 on the arrangement of commune-level administrative units of Đồng Tháp province in 2025 (effective from June 16, 2025). Accordingly, the entire land area and population of Ward 1, Ward 2, Ward 3, Ward 4, An Hòa, Tân Quy Đông wards and Tân Khánh Đông, Tân Quy Tây communes of the former Sa Đéc city will be integrated into a new ward named Sa Đéc (Clause 98, Article 1).

== Tourism ==
Sa Dec Flower Village is a tourism area associated with ornamental flower cultivation in Tân Quy Đông Village. Tourism activities include walking and cycling through flower gardens and photography. Notable sites include Ngọc Lan Ornamental Garden and Sa Nhiên Garden.
