= Lấp Vò district =

Lấp Vò district Huyện Lấp Vò
- District
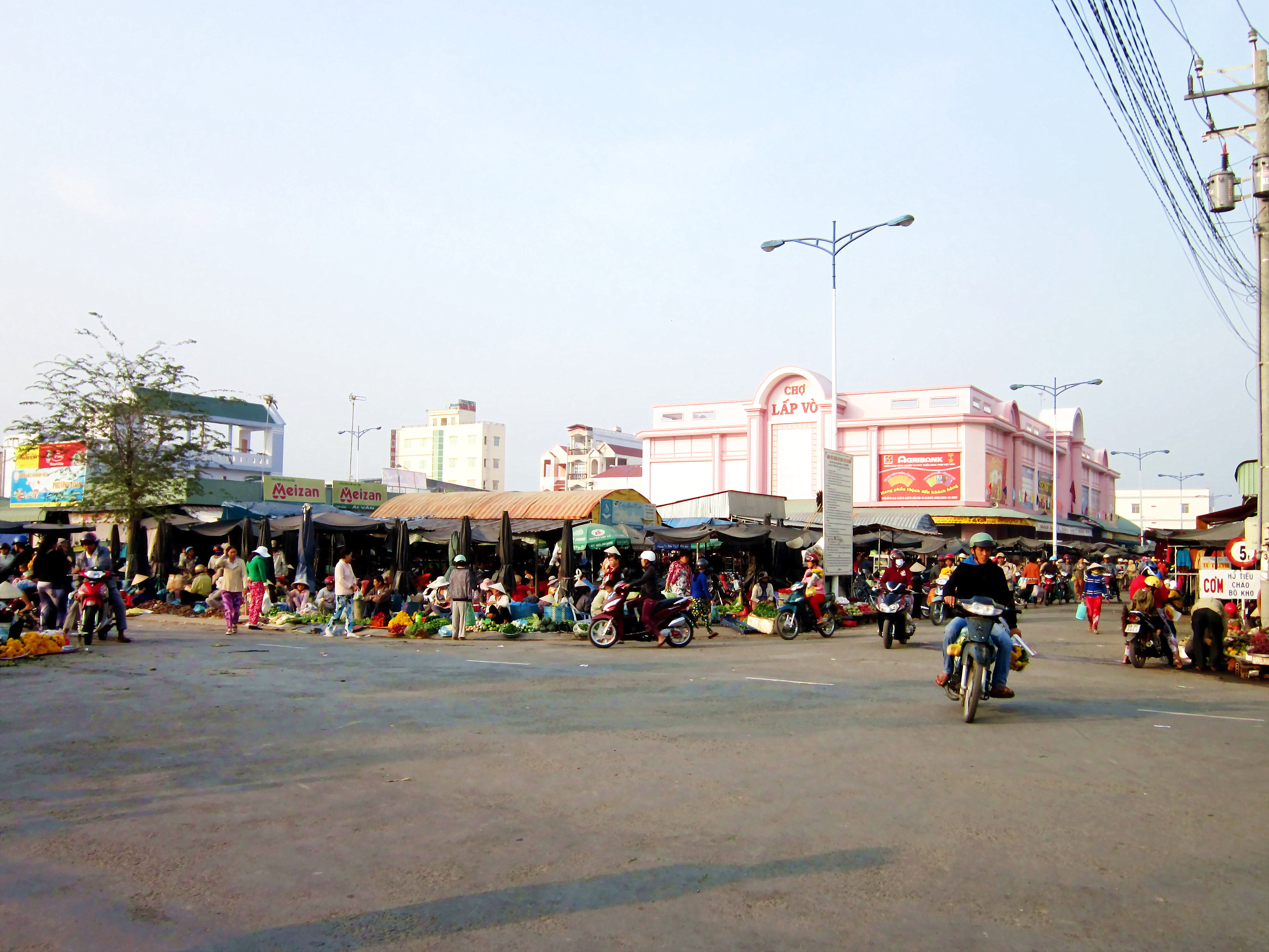
- Lấp Vò market
- Country: Vietnam
- Region: Mekong Delta
- Province: Đồng Tháp
- Capital: Lấp Vò town

Area
  - Total: 94 sq mi (244 km^{2})

Population (2019)
  - Total: 242,024
- Time zone: UTC+7 (Indochina Time)

Lấp Vò is a rural district (huyện) of Đồng Tháp province in the Mekong Delta region of Vietnam. As of 2003 the district had a population of 180,431. The district covers an area of 244 km^{2} (94 sq mi). The district capital is Lấp Vò town. It borders Long Xuyên of An Giang Province at Vàm Cống ferry, one of a few full-size heavy-duty ferry services left in Mekong delta. From the Vàm Cống ferry, travelers can reach Sa Đéc by local bus. This location is known for its unique scenery, and waterways are visible from the bus route.

== Divisions ==
The district is divided into communes:

- Lấp Vò
- Mỹ An Hưng A
- Mỹ An Hưng B
- Tân Mỹ
- Tân Khánh Trung
- Long Hưng A
- Long Hưng B
- Vĩnh Thạnh
- Hội An Đông
- Bình Thạnh Trung
- Định Yên
- Định An
- Bình Thành
