= Thanh Khê station =

Railway station in Vietnam

General information
- Location: 783 Trần Cao Vân, Thanh Khê Đông, Thanh Khê; Vietnam
- Coordinates: 16°3′59″N 108°10′57″E
- Owner: Vietnam Railways
- Operator: Vietnam Railways

Construction
- Structure type: Ground

Services
Preceding station	Vietnam Railways	Following station
Đà Nẵng towards Hanoi	North–South	Huế towards Saigon
Location

Thanh Khê station is a railway station on the North–South railway (Reunification Express) in Vietnam. It serves the district of Thanh Khê, on the outskirts of Đà Nẵng.
