= Hùng Sơn (disambiguation) =

Hùng Sơn may refer to several places in Vietnam, including:

- Hùng Sơn, a commune of Da Nang
- Hùng Sơn, Phú Thọ, a former township of Lâm Thao district
- Hùng Sơn, Thái Nguyên, a former township and capital of Đại Từ district
- Hùng Sơn, Bắc Giang, a former commune of Hiệp Hòa district
- Hùng Sơn, Hải Dương, a former commune of Thanh Miện district
- Hùng Sơn, Lạng Sơn, a former commune of Tràng Định district
- Hùng Sơn, Nghệ An, a former commune of Anh Sơn district
- Hùng Sơn, Thanh Hóa, a former commune of Tĩnh Gia district
