= AUV (disambiguation) =

An AUV is an autonomous underwater vehicle.

AUV may also refer to:

- auv, the ISO 639 code for Auvergnat, a northern dialect of Occitan spoken in central and southern France
- Athletes Unlimited Volleyball, a women's professional indoor volleyball league in the US
- The American University of Vietnam, a private, higher-educational institution based in Da Nang City, Vietnam
- Asian utility vehicles, a type of road vehicle
- Atruvera Aviation, the ICAO code AUV
