= Nguyễn Quang Hồng =

Vietnamese lexicographer and scholar (1940–2025)

- Born: 1 October 1940; Duy Trung, Duy Xuyên, Quảng Nam, Vietnam
- Died: 7 October 2025 (aged 85); Hanoi, Vietnam
- Spouse: Phan Diễm Phương

Academic background
- Education: Peking University, China; Moscow State University, Russia

Academic work
- Notable works: Tự điển Chữ Nôm dẫn giải; Khái luận văn tự học chữ Nôm

Nguyễn Quang Hồng (1 October 1940 – 7 October 2025), also known as Quảng Nguyên, was a Vietnamese lexicographer and scholar at the Institute of Hán-Nôm Studies in Hanoi. He was editor in chief of the standard dictionary of the ancient vernacular Chữ Nôm written language. Nguyễn was born in Duy Xuyên.

Nguyễn died at the age of 85 in Hanoi on 7 October 2025.
