= Sơn Trà =

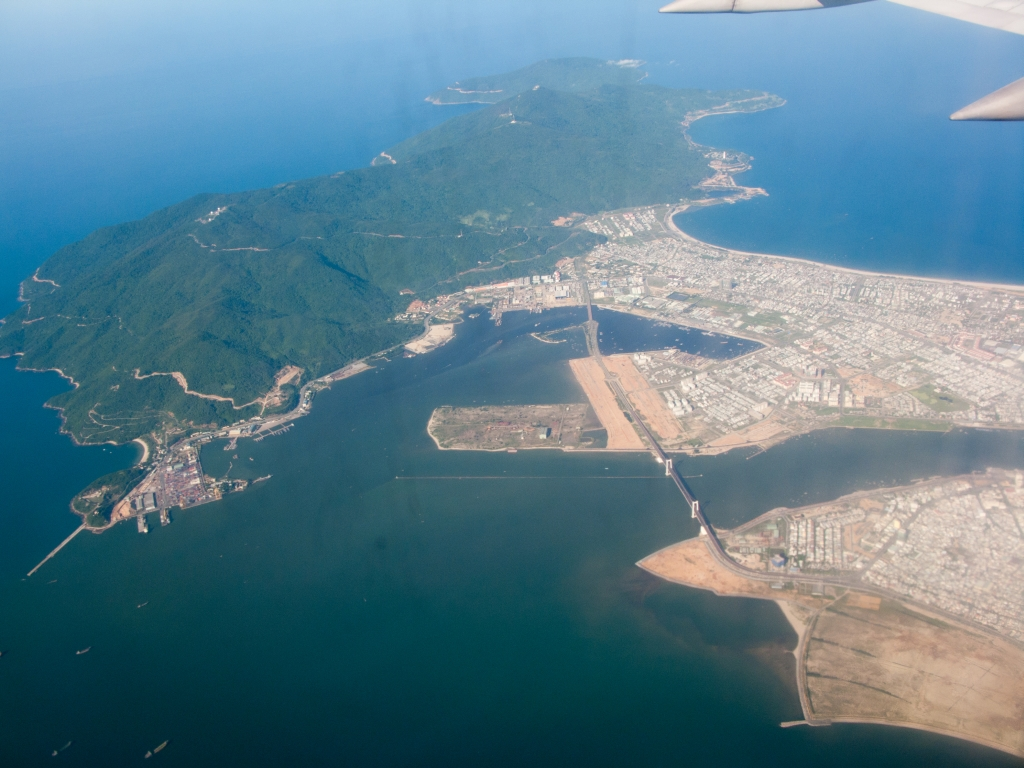
- Sơn Trà Ward viewed from above
- Interactive map of Sơn Trà
- Coordinates: 16.10113984749214°N 108.24981382191929°E
- Country: Vietnam
- Region: South Central Coast and Central Highlands
- Municipality: Da Nang
- Administrative headquarters: 06 Nguyễn Phan Vinh Street

Area
  - Total: 56.03 km^{2} (21.63 sq mi)

Population (2025)
  - Total: 86,890
  - Density: 1,550/km^{2} (4,000/sq mi)
- Website: sontra.danang.gov.vn

Sơn Trà is a ward in the municipality of Da Nang, Vietnam. The ward is located on the Sơn Trà Peninsula. Tiên Sa Port, an important deep-water port of Da Nang, is located within the ward.

On 16 June 2025:

- District-level administrative units nationwide were dissolved, effective 1 July 2025.
- The entire area and population of Thọ Quang, Nại Hiên Đông, and Mân Thái wards, formerly part of Sơn Trà district in Da Nang, were merged to form a new ward named Sơn Trà.
