= Vu Gia =

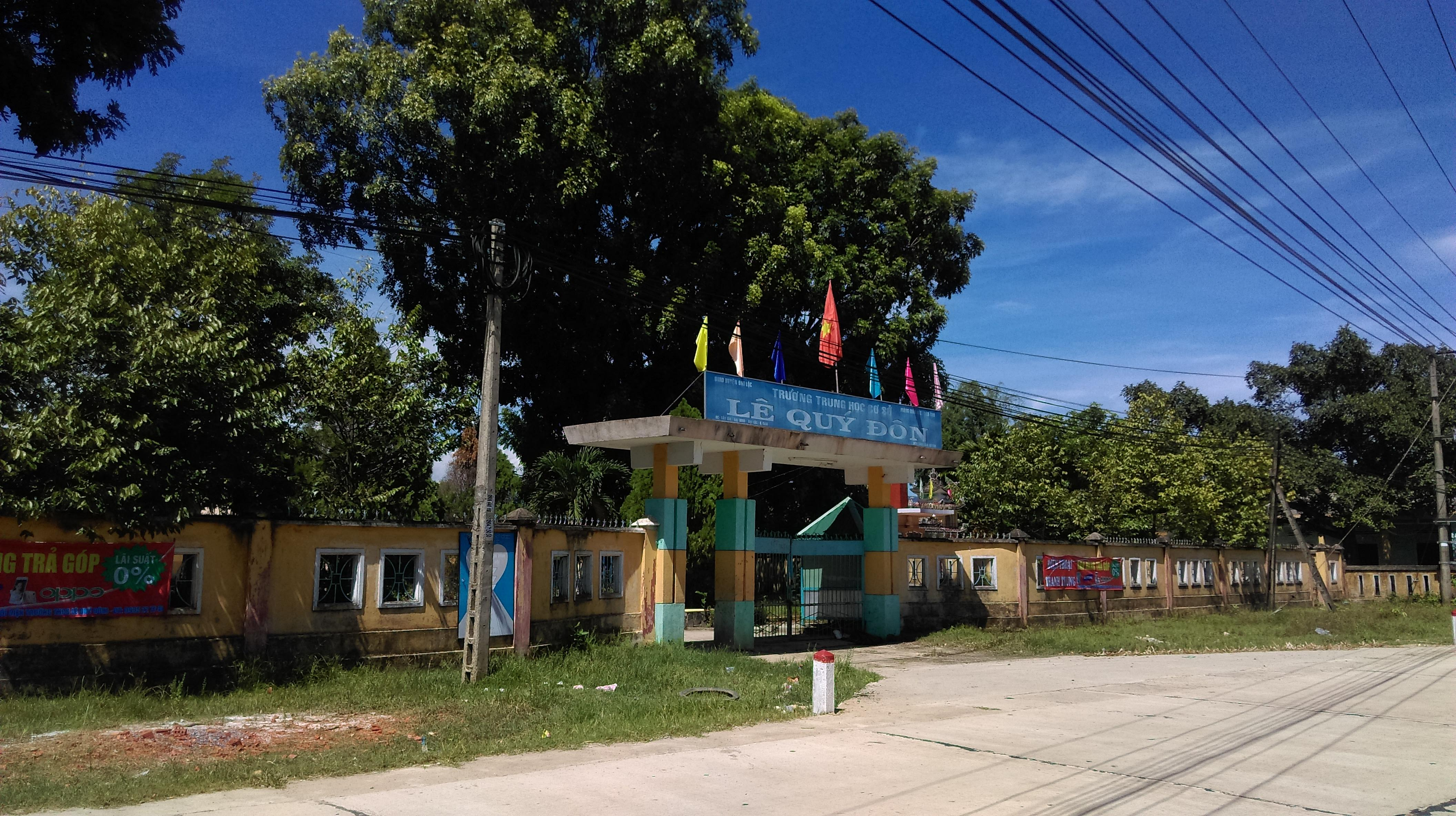
- Lê Quý Đôn Secondary School
- Interactive map of Vu Gia
- Coordinates: 15.853741103336567°N 108.06706409097077°E
- Country: Vietnam
- Region: South Central Coast and Central Highlands
- Municipality: Da Nang
- Administrative headquarters: Lâm Yên Hamlet

Area
  - Total: 25.12 km^{2} (9.70 sq mi)

Population (2025)
  - Total: 27,649
  - Density: 1,100/km^{2} (2,800/sq mi)
- Website: vugia.danang.gov.vn

Vu Gia is a commune in the municipality of Da Nang, Vietnam.

On 16 June 2025:

- District-level administrative units nationwide were dissolved.
- The entire area and population of Đại Phong, Đại Minh, and Đại Cường communes, formerly part of Đại Lộc district in the former Quảng Nam province, were merged to form a new commune named Vu Gia.
