= Nam Giang =

- Commune
- Location in Vietnam
- Coordinates: 15.620406003334793°N 107.50920982016565°E
- Country: Vietnam
- Region: South Central Coast and Central Highlands
- Municipality: Da Nang
- Administrative headquarters: A Bát Hamlet

Area
  - Total: 262.94 km^{2} (101.52 sq mi)

Population (2025)
  - Total: 4,301
  - Density: 16/km^{2} (41/sq mi)
- Website: namgiang.danang.gov.vn

Nam Giang is a commune in the municipality of Da Nang, Vietnam.

On 16 June 2025:

- District-level administrative units nationwide were dissolved.
- The entire area and population of Zuôih and Chà Vàl communes, formerly part of Nam Giang district in Quảng Nam province, were merged to form a new commune named Nam Giang.
