= Da Nang University of Architecture =

Đà Nẵng University of Architecture (in Vietnamese: Đại học Kiến trúc Đà Nẵng) is a private university in Đà Nẵng city, Central Vietnam. It was established on November 27, 2006. (Note: Government decree no. 270/2006/QD-TTg.) The university offers undergraduate courses in a number of fields:

Architecture

- Architecture
- Urban planning
- Home design
- Interior decor

Arts

- Graphic design
- Fashion
- Painting
- Sculpture

Engineering

- Civil engineering
- Transportation engineering
- Construction management
