= Cu Đê River =

River in Vietnam

Coordinates: 16.11950°N 108.06226°E

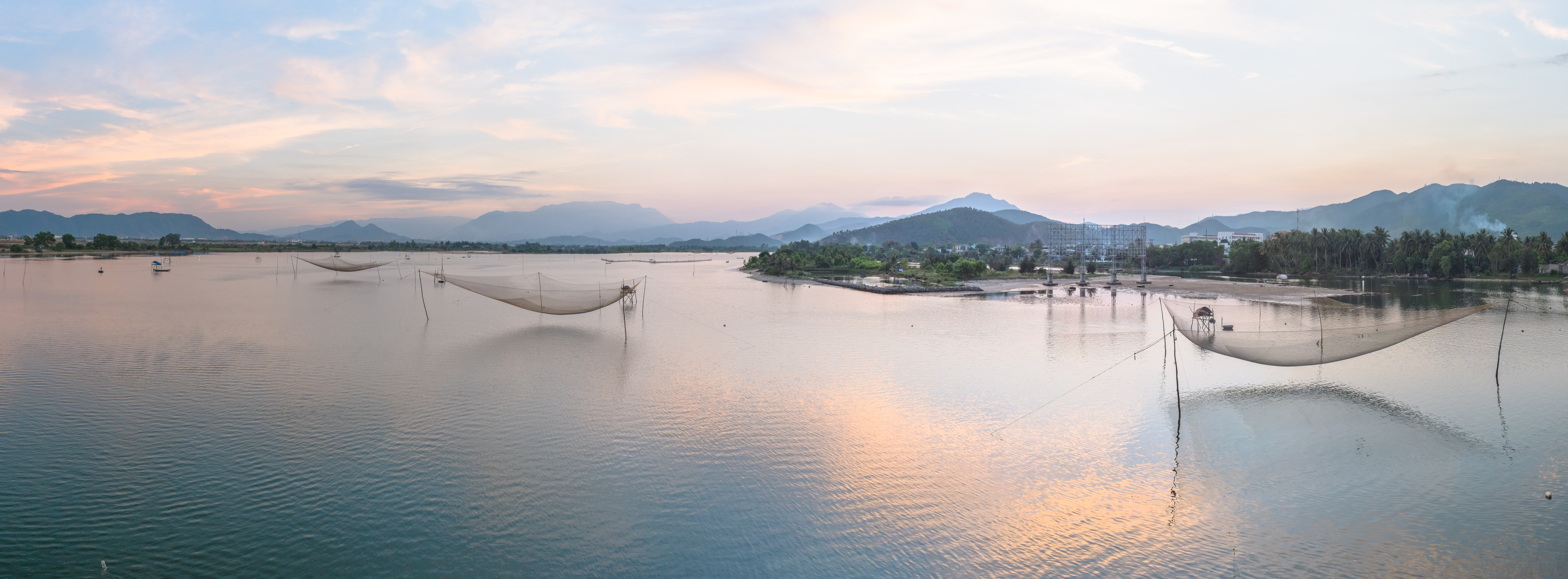
Hanging fishing nets in the Cu Đê river

The Cu Đê River (Vietnamese: Sông Cu Đê), other name Trường Định River is a river of Da Nang, Vietnam.
