= Thanh Khê =

- Ward
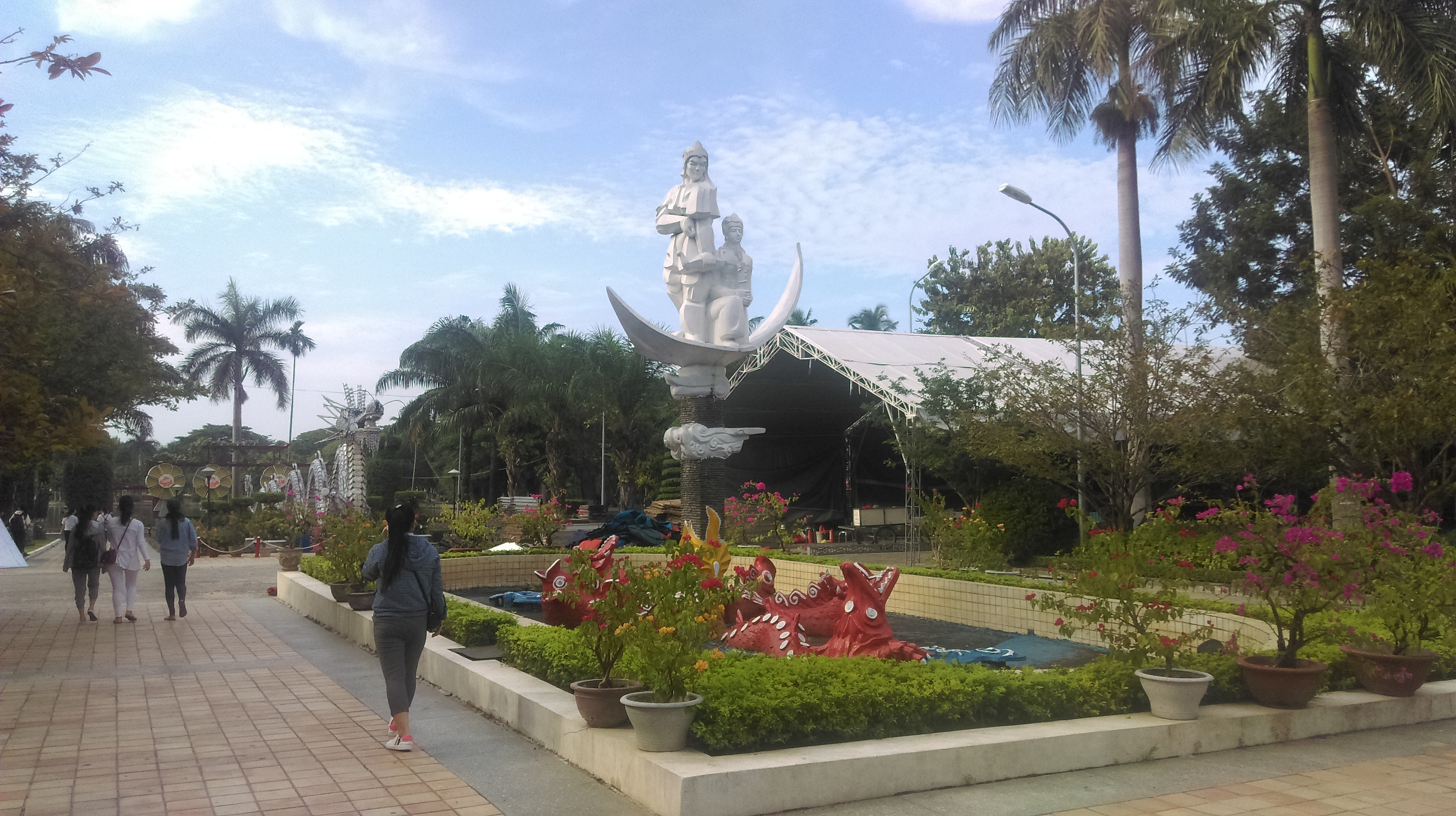
- 29 March Park

- Location in Vietnam
- Coordinates: 16.071091670872157°N 108.19179823877519°E
- Country: Vietnam
- Region: South Central Coast and Central Highlands
- Municipality: Da Nang
- Administrative headquarters: 503 Trần Cao Vân Street

Area
  - Total: 7.92 km^{2} (3.06 sq mi)

Population (2025)
  - Total: 201,240
  - Density: 25,409/km^{2} (65,810/sq mi)
- Website: thanhkhe.danang.gov.vn

Thanh Khê is a ward in the municipality of Da Nang, Vietnam. It is also the most populous administrative unit in the municipality.

On 16 June 2025:

- District-level administrative units nationwide were dissolved.
- The entire area and population of Xuân Hà, Chính Gián, Thạc Gián, Thanh Khê Tây, and Thanh Khê Đông wards, formerly part of Thanh Khê district, Da Nang, were merged to form a new ward named Thanh Khê.
