= Duy Xuyên =

- Commune
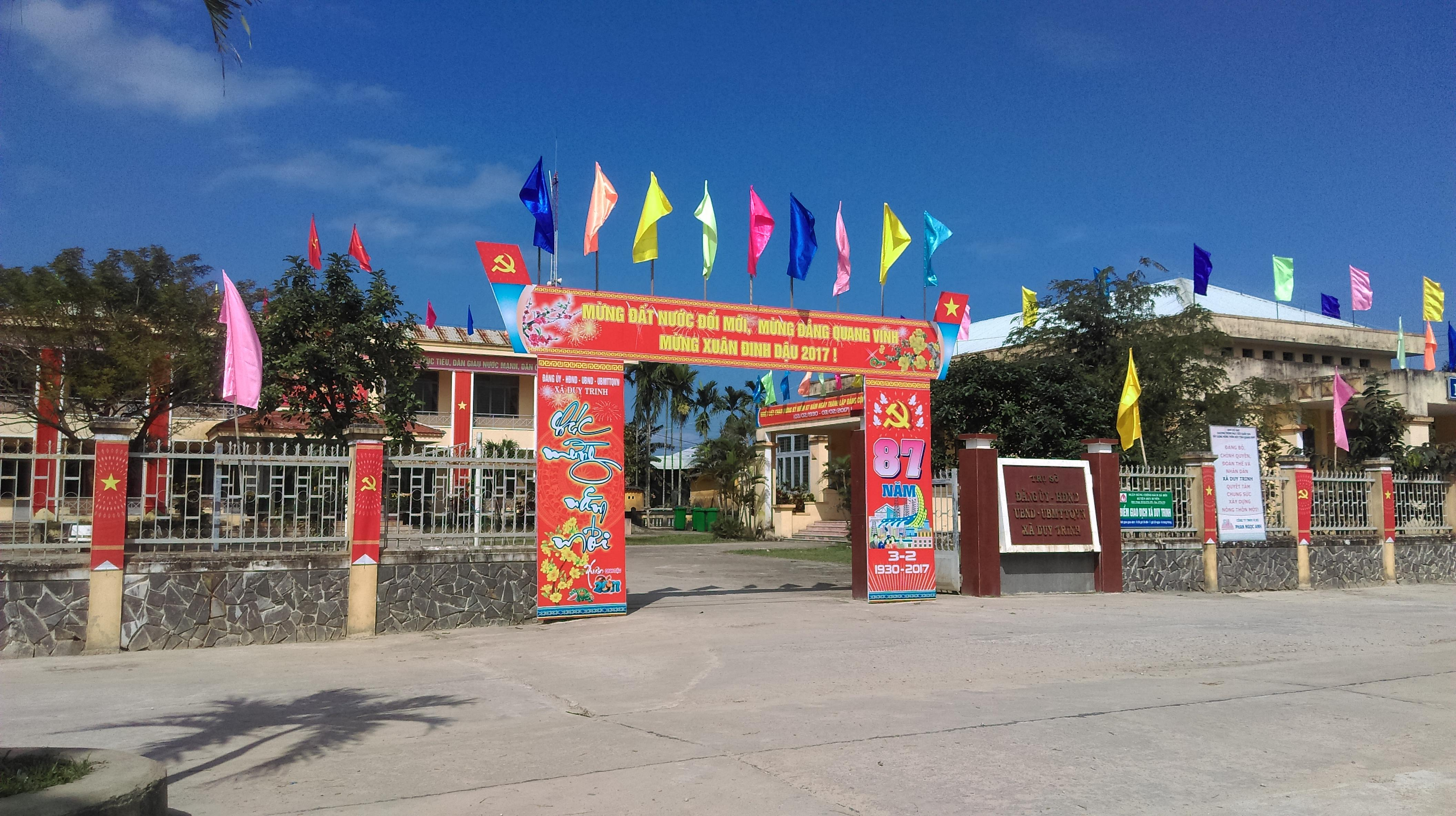
- Former Duy Trinh commune administrative office

- Location in Vietnam
- Coordinates: 15.804368491309175°N 108.25793061565672°E
- Country: Vietnam
- Region: South Central Coast
- Municipality: Da Nang
- Administrative headquarters: An Hòa Hamlet

Area
  - Total: 125.78 km^{2} (48.56 sq mi)

Population (2025)
  - Total: 32,243
  - Density: 256/km^{2} (660/sq mi)
- Website: duyxuyen.danang.gov.vn

Duy Xuyên is a commune in the municipality of Da Nang, Vietnam.

On 16 June 2025:

- District-level administrative units nationwide were dissolved.
- The entire area and population of Duy Trung, Duy Sơn, and Duy Trinh communes, formerly part of Duy Xuyên district in Quảng Nam province, were merged to form a new commune named Duy Xuyên.
