= American University in Vietnam =

University in Da Nang, Vietnam

The American University in Vietnam
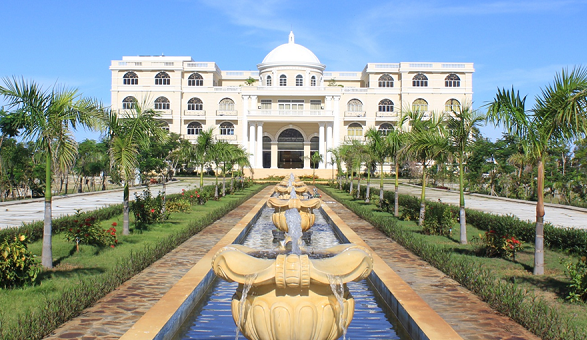
- Other names: AUV
- Type: Private
- Established: 2011
- Founders: Binh Tran
- Superintendent: President
- Provost: John Behzad, Ph.D.
- Location: 299 Tran Dai Nghia Street, Hoa Quy Ward, Ngu Hanh Son District, Da Nang, Vietnam
- Campus: Suburban and Urban, 75 acres (30 ha)
- Colors: Dark blue, light green
- Website: www.auv.edu.vn

The American University in Vietnam (AUV) is a private, higher-educational institution based in Da Nang City, Vietnam, offering American style college education.

== Partnerships ==
AUV University is partnered with the following universities for academic guidance and credit transfer programs:

- Arizona State University
- Wentworth Institute of Technology
- Central Michigan University
- University of Missouri-Kansas City
- Virginia Commonwealth University
