= Hùng Sơn =

- Interactive map of Hùng Sơn
- Coordinates: 15.978584052871494°N 107.90494113922898°E
- Country: Vietnam
- Region: South Central Coast and Central Highlands
- Municipality: Da Nang
- Administrative headquarters: Arâng Hamlet

Area
  - Total: 287.95 km^{2} (111.18 sq mi)

Population (2025)
  - Total: 7,958
  - Density: 27/km^{2} (70/sq mi)
- Website: hungson.danang.gov.vn

Hùng Sơn is a commune in the municipality of Da Nang, Vietnam.

On 16 June 2025:

- District-level administrative units nationwide were dissolved.
- The entire area and population of Ch'ơm, Gari, Tr'hy, and Axan communes, formerly part of Tây Giang district in the former Quảng Nam province, were merged to form a new commune named Hùng Sơn.
