= Thanh Khê district =

Coordinates: 16°03′28″N 108°11′00″E

Thanh Khê district Quận Thanh Khê District II (Quận II)
- Urban district
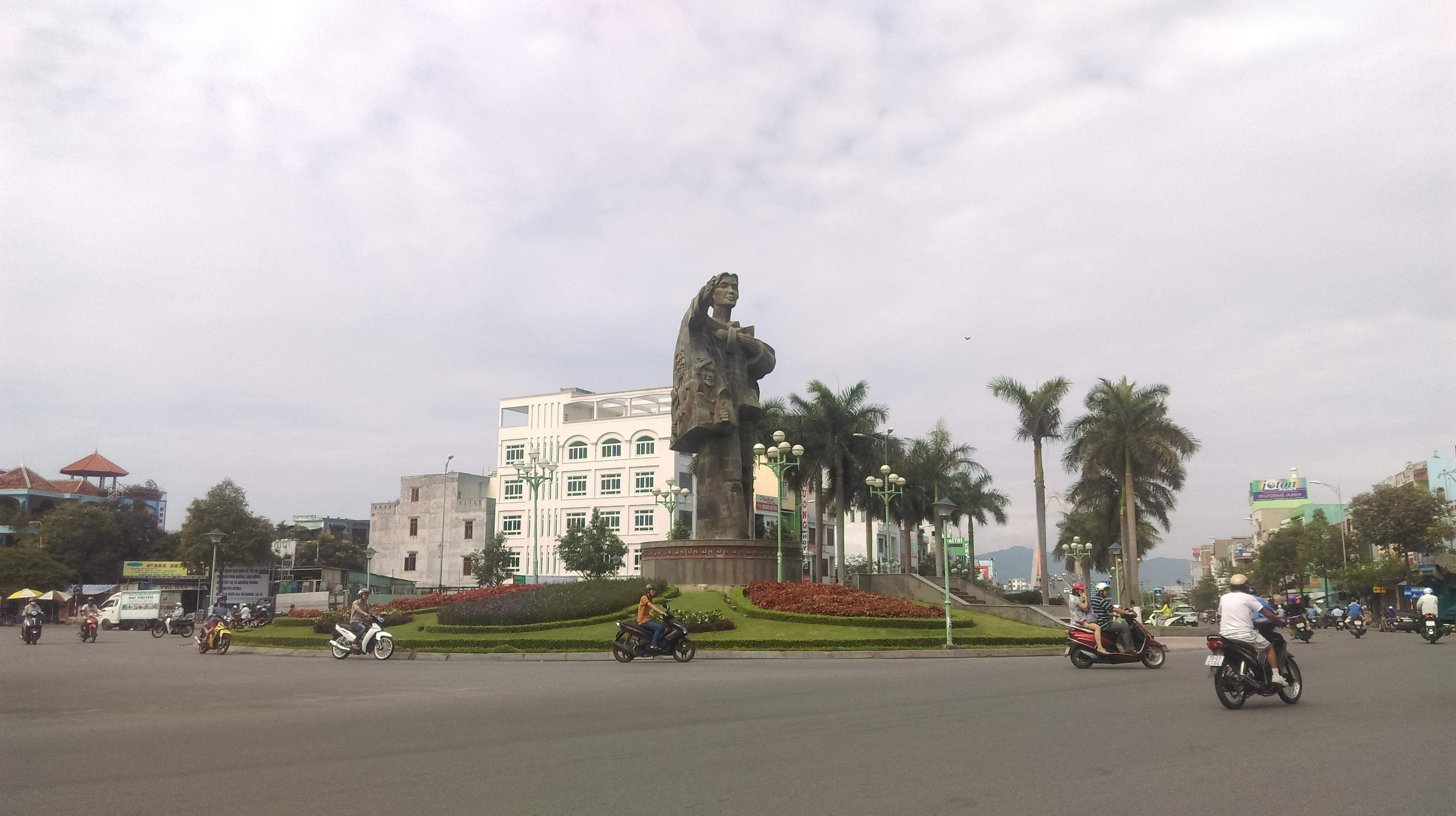
- Mẹ Nhu Statue

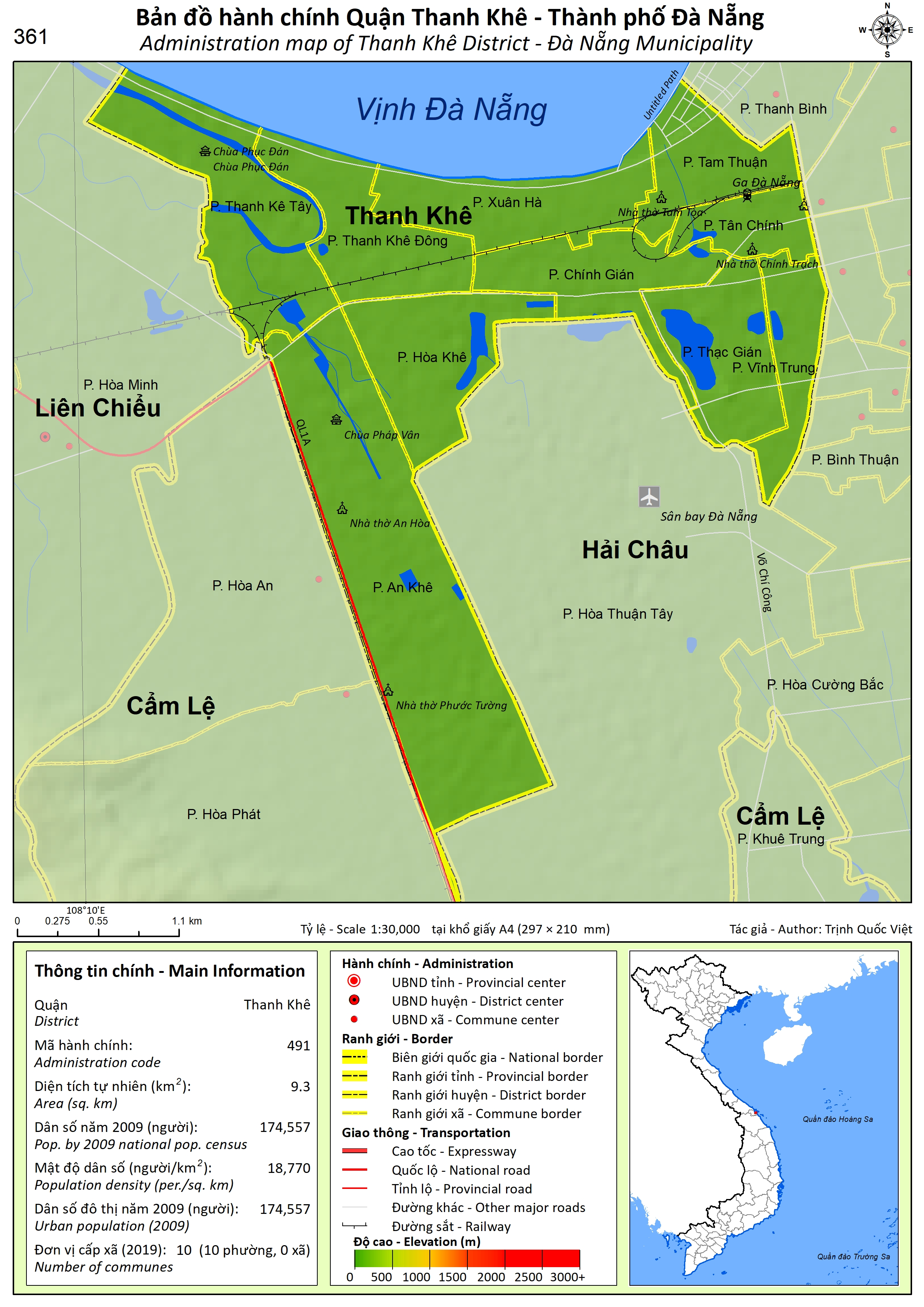
- Administration map of the district in Da Nang
- Country: Vietnam
- Region: South Central Coast
- Municipality: Da Nang
- Capital: Da Nang

Area
  - Total: 3.5 sq mi (9 km^{2})

Population (2018)
  - Total: 205,341
- Time zone: UTC+7 (Indochina Time)

Thanh Khê is a former Da Nang urban district in Vietnam's South Central Coast area. The district has a total size of 9 km^{2} and a population of 160,953 people in 2003. The district capital lies at Xuân Hà ward.

There are ten wards (phường) in the district:

- An Khê
- Chính Gián
- Tam Thuận
- Tân Chính
- Thạc Gián
- Hòa Khê
- Xuân Hà
- Vĩnh Trung
- Thanh Khê Đông
- Thanh Khê Tây
