= Da Nang =

Centrally-governed city of Vietnam

Da Nang Thành phố Đà Nẵng Quảng Nam
- Centrally-governed city
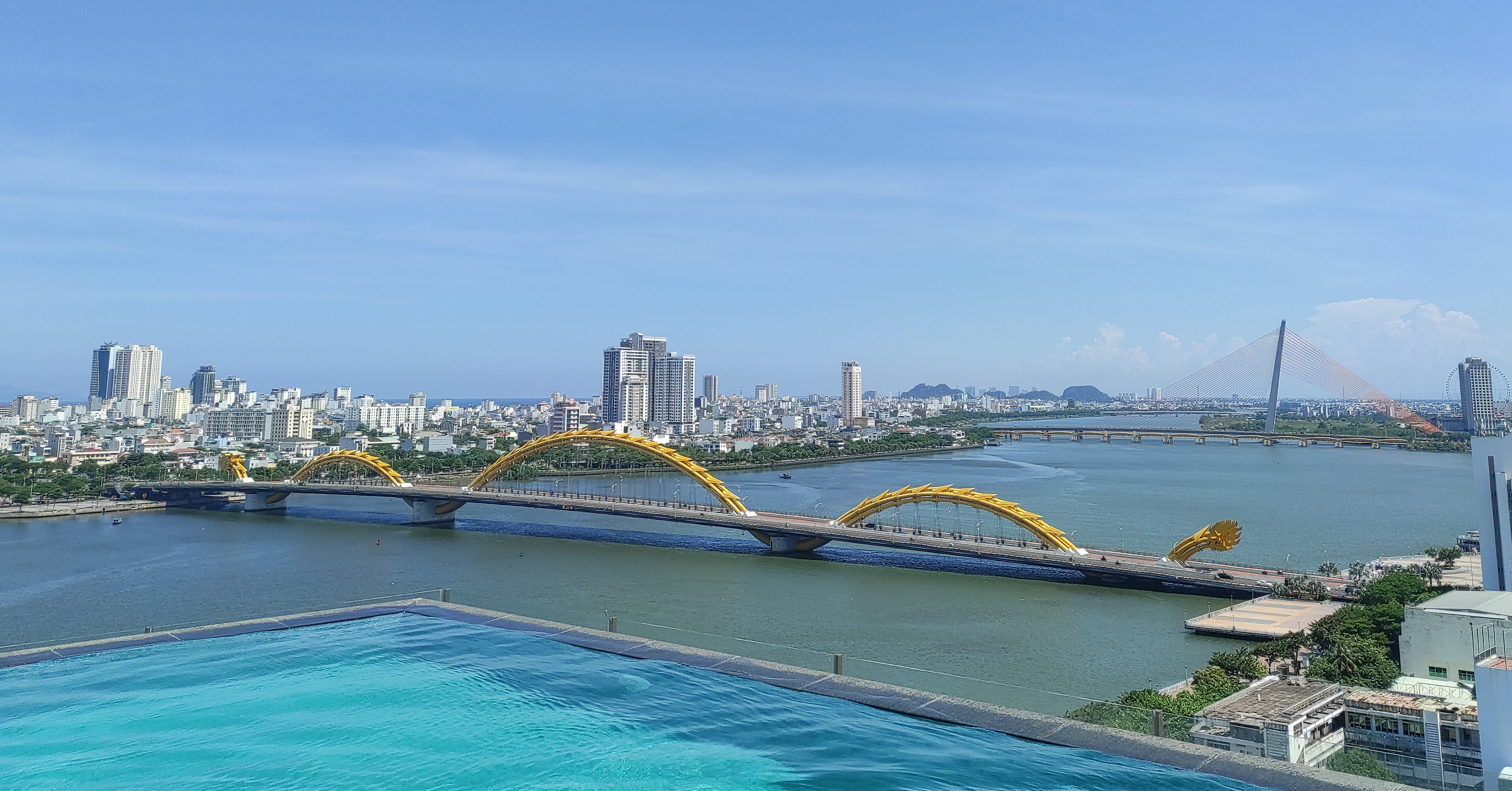
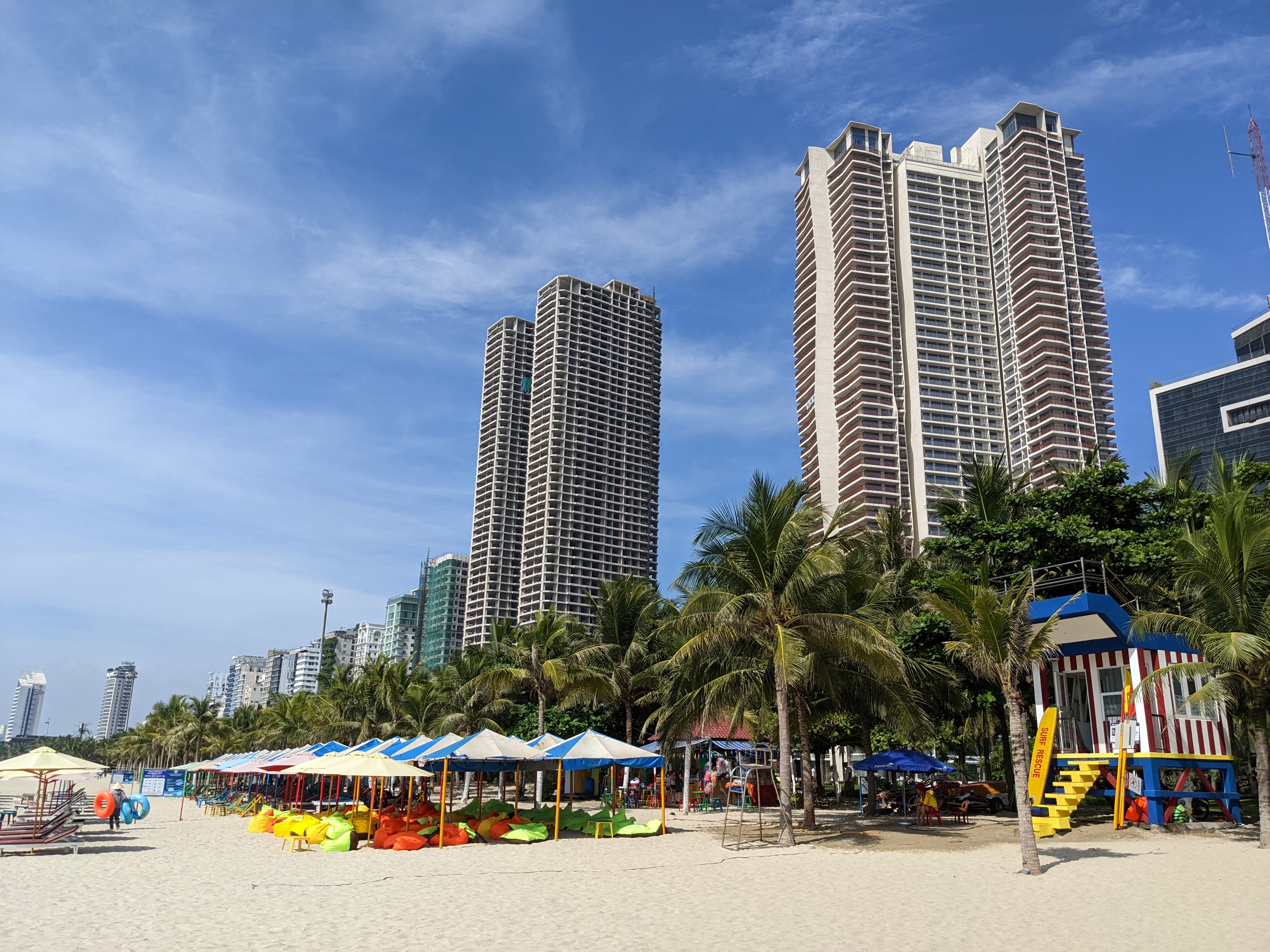
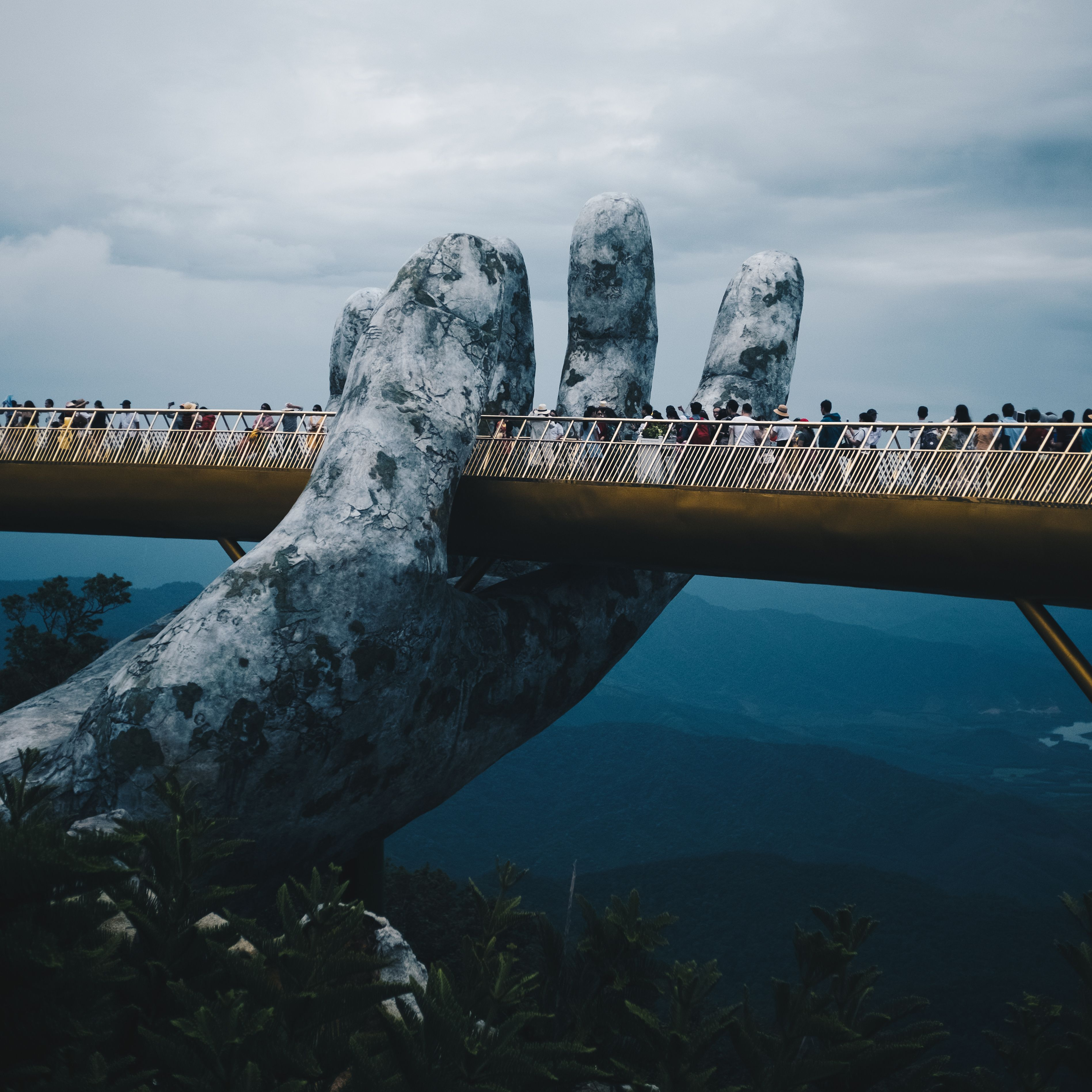
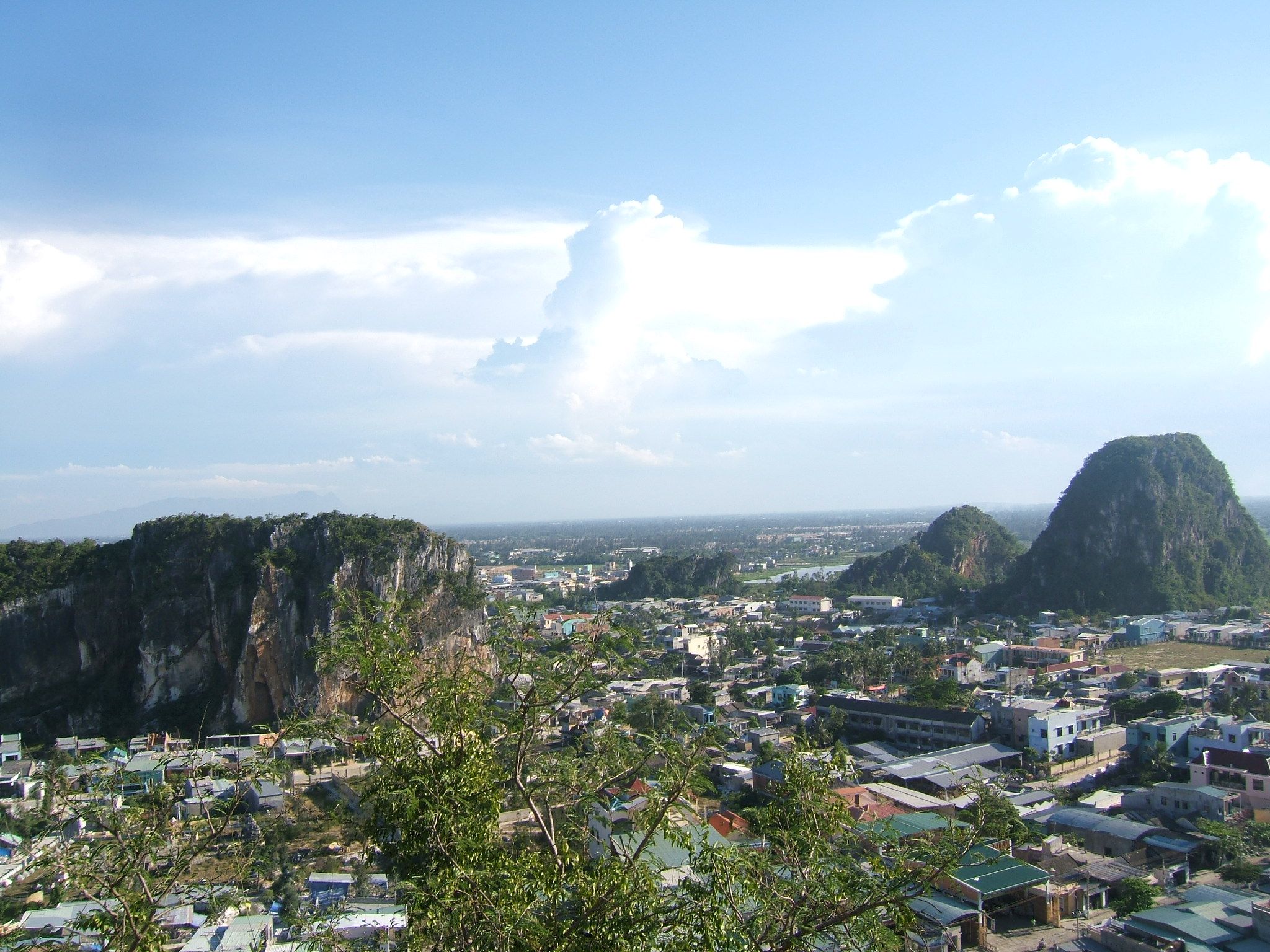
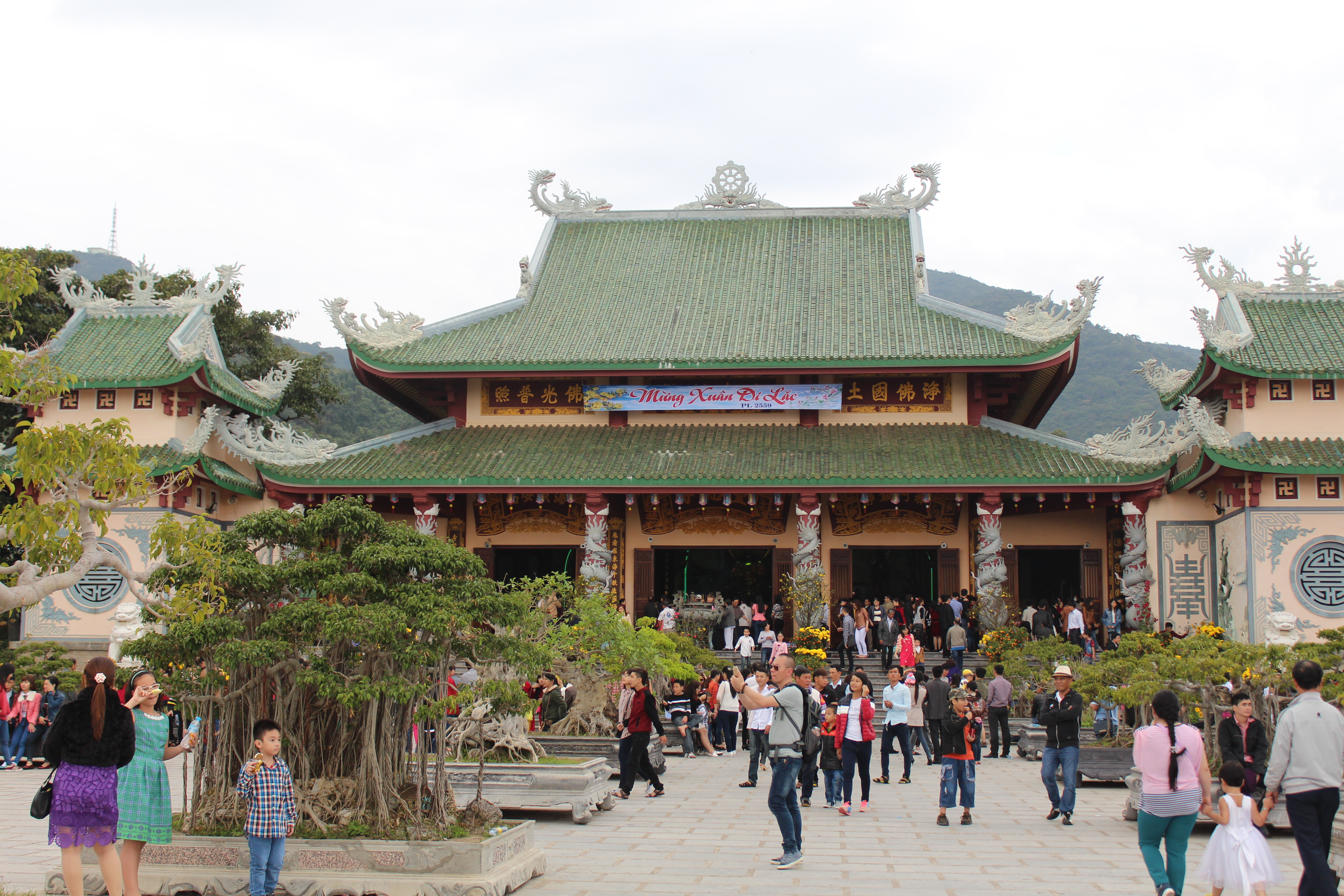
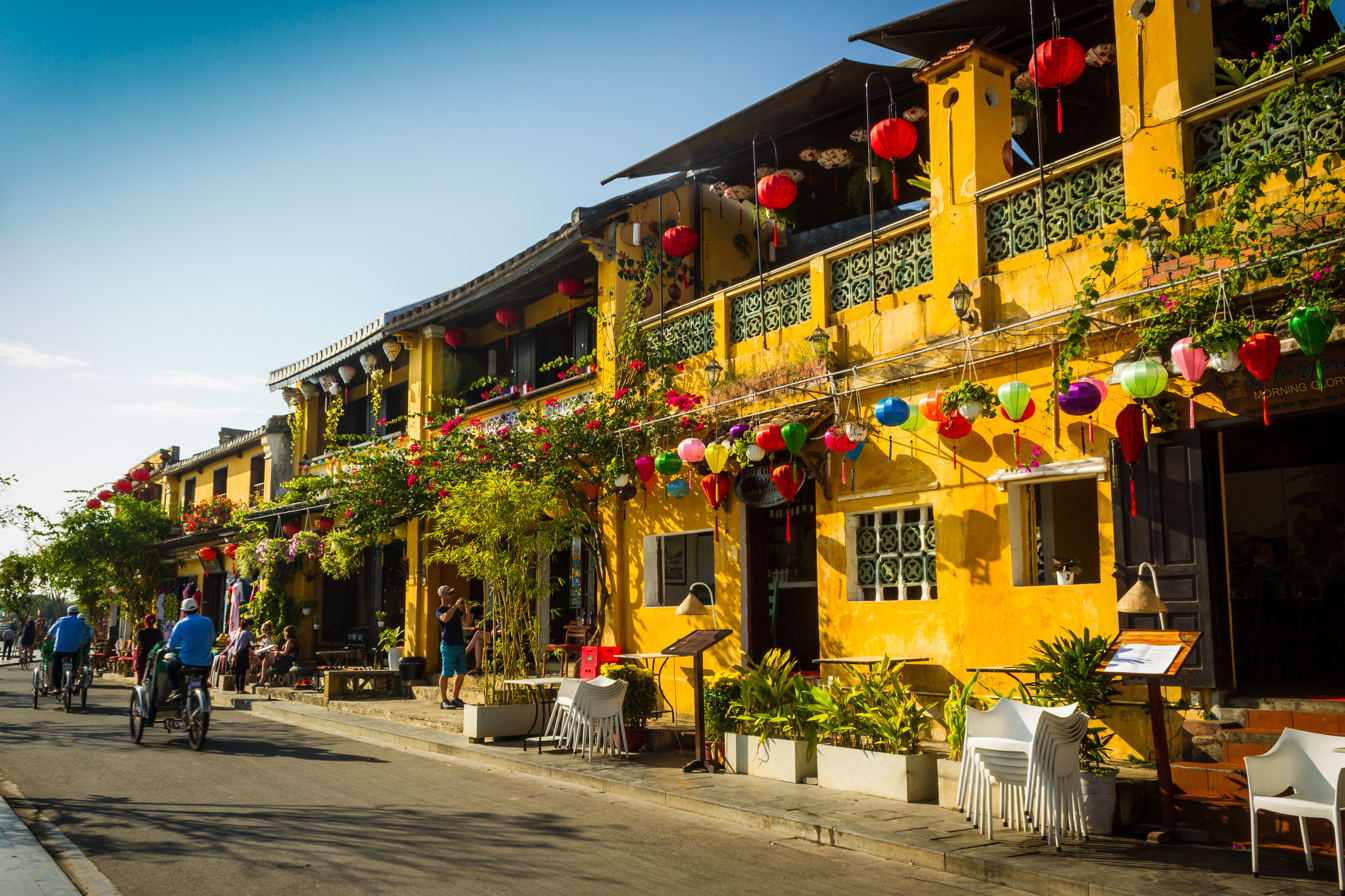
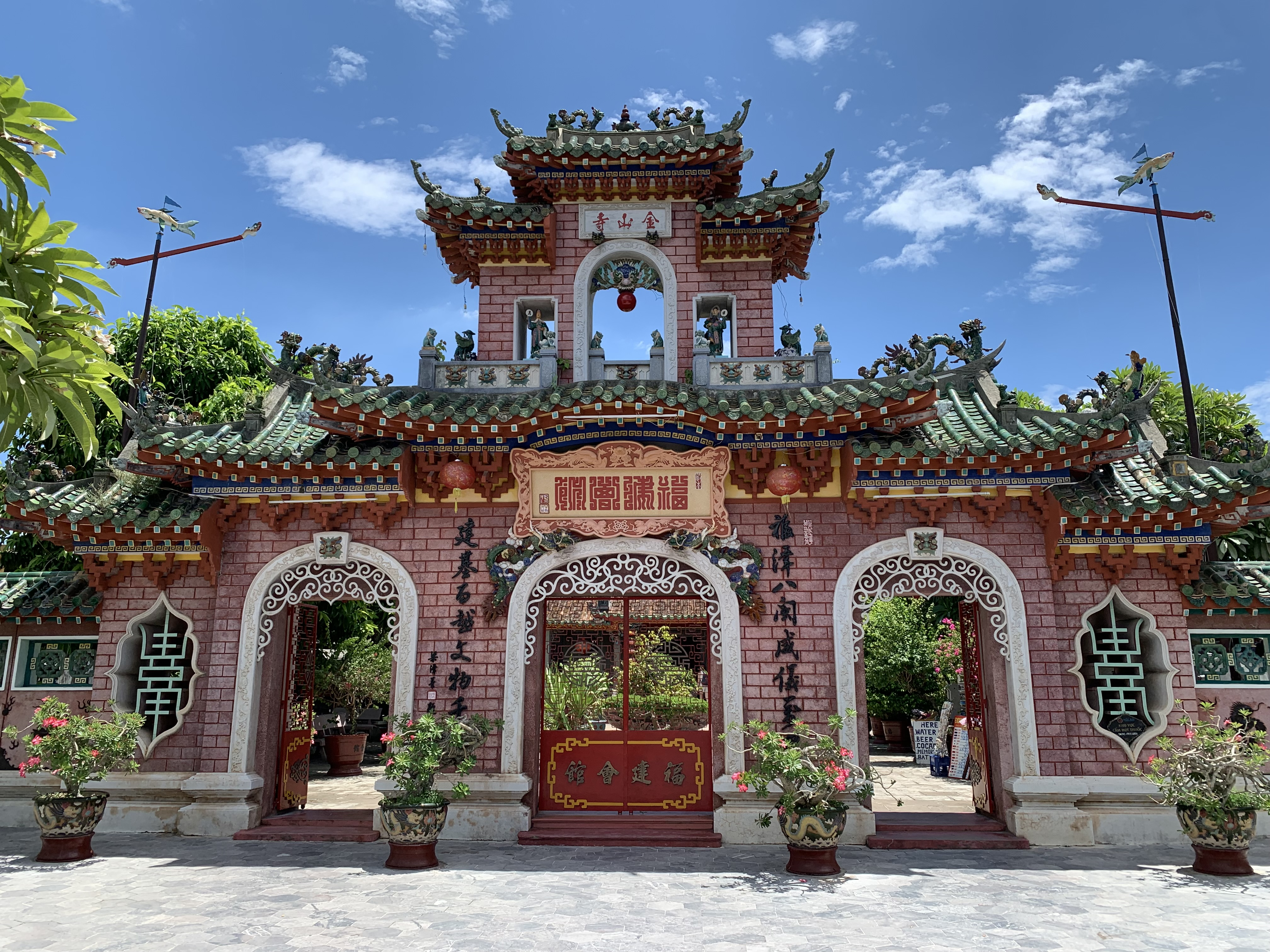
- Dragon Bridge My Khe Beach Golden Bridge Marble Mountains Linh Ung Pagoda Hội An Phuc Kien Assembly Hall

- Seal

- Interactive map of Da Nang
- Coordinates: 16°04′10″N 108°12′35″E
- Country: Vietnam
- Region: South Central Coast and Central Highlands
- Capital: Hải Châu ward
- Subdivision: 23 wards, 70 communes, 1 special zone

Government
  - Type: Centrally-governed city
  - Body: Danang People's Council
  - Party Secretary: Lê Ngọc Quang
  - Chairman of People's Council: Nguyễn Đức Dũng
  - Chairman of People's Committee: Nguyễn Mạnh Hùng

Area
  - Centrally-governed city: 11,859.59 km^{2} (4,579.01 sq mi)
- Highest elevation (Ngọc Linh Mount): 2,598 m (8,524 ft)
- Lowest elevation (South China Sea): 0 m (0 ft)

Population (2025)
  - Centrally-governed city: 3,856,400
  - Density: 325.17/km^{2} (842.19/sq mi)
  - Urban: 2,127,700
  - Rural: 1,728,700
  - Dialect: Quảng Nam
- Demonym: Danangese

GDP
  - Total: VND 279.926 trillion US$ 11.4 billion
- Time zone: UTC+7 (ICT)
- Postal code: 50xxx
- Area codes: 236
- ISO 3166 code: VN-DN
- License plate: 43
- HDI (2022): ▲0.800 (5th)
- Website: www.danang.gov.vn

Da Nang (Vietnamese: Đà Nẵng, pronounced [ɗa˨˩ naŋ˨˩˦ˀ]), also written unspaced as Danang, is the fourth largest city in Vietnam by population and the second largest by geographical area and located in the South Central Coast and Central Highlands. As one of the country's nine centrally-governed cities, it falls under the administration of the central government. Da Nang's port and its location on National Route 1 and the North–South Railway makes it a transport hub. APEC 2017 was hosted in this city. Da Nang has a Human Development Index of 0.800 (very high), ranking fifth among all municipalities and provinces of Vietnam.

The city was known as Cửa Hàn (Hàn River Estuary) during Đại Việt period when it was a small settlement, and as Tourane (or Turon) during French colonial rule between 1884 and 1945. Before 1997, the city was part of Quang Nam–Da Nang province. On 1 January 1997, Da Nang was separated from Quảng Nam province to become one of the centrally controlled municipalities. Da Nang is designated as a first class city. In a proposal announced in April 2025, which came into force starting 1 July that year, the new Da Nang city was formed by reabsorbing Quảng Nam whilst maintaining its political and administrative centres.

== Names ==
Most of the names by which Da Nang has been known make reference to its position at the Hàn River estuary. The city's name is agreed by some to be a Vietnamese adaptation of the Cham word da nak, which is translated as 'opening of a large river'.

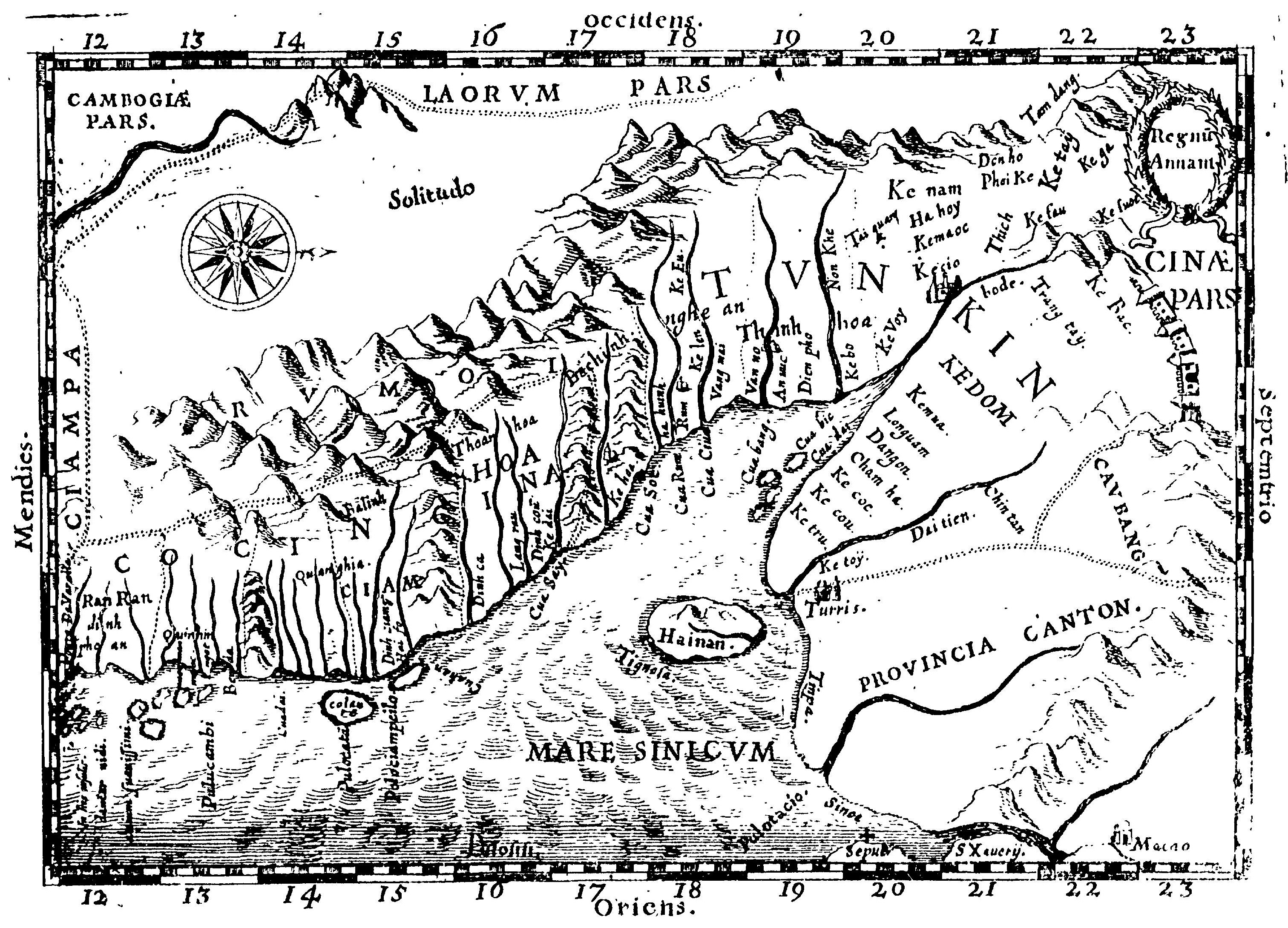
A map of Annam drafted by Alexandre de Rhodes. "Cua han" appears along the coast (upside-down, left of centre).

Other Chamic sources, with similar definitions, have been proposed. Inrasara (aka Phú Trạm), a researcher specializing in Champa, suggests Da Nang is a variation of the Cham word daknan (lit. 'the large water'); Sakaya (aka Văn Món), another Champa researcher, claims a connection with the Raglai word danang, meaning 'river source'.

Another name given to Da Nang was Cửa Hàn (lit. 'mouth of the Han [river]'). The name used by the French, Tourane, is said to derive from this name, by way of a rough transliteration. This name (spelled Cua han) appears on maps of the area drafted by Alexandre de Rhodes in 1650. The name Kean (compare Kẻ Hàn, roughly 'Han market') was another name purportedly used during the 17th century to refer to the land at the foot of the Hải Vân Pass.

Other names referring to Da Nang include:

- Vũng Thùng, a colloquial name which survives in folklore. (Note: "Hearing the sudden gunfire, we know that the Western ships anchored at Vung Thung yesterday" ("Tai nghe súng nổ cái đùng, Tàu Tây đã lại Vũng Thùng hôm qua"). "Name of Danang through periods of time". Da Nang People's Committee. 3 January 2004. Archived from the original on 19 March 2012.)
- Trà Úc, Trà Áo, Trà Sơn and Đồng Long Loan, literary names used by Confucian scholars.
- In Chinese, Danang is known as Chinese: 峴港; pinyin: Xiàngǎng), this is derived from the older name 蜆港 ('clam harbor').
- In chữ Nôm, used until 1945, Đà Nẵng is written as 沱灢, a simplified form of 沱㶞.
- Thái Phiên, a name used after the 1945 August Revolution, commemorating Thái Phiên, the leader of revolts during the 1916 Duy Tân Resistance.

== History ==
=== Ancient ===
The city's origins date back to the kingdom of Champa, established in 192 AD. At its peak, the Chams' sphere of influence stretched from Huế to Vũng Tàu. The city of Indrapura, at the site of the village of Dong Duong in Quảng Nam Province (about 50 km (31 mi) from Da Nang), was the capital of Champa from about 875 to about 1000 AD. Also in the region of Da Nang were the Cham city of Singhapura ("City of the Lion"), the location of which has been identified with an archeological site in the village of Trà Kiệu, and the valley of Mỹ Sơn.

In the latter half of the 10th century, the kings of Indrapura came into conflict with Đại Việt, who were then based at Hoa Lư. As an independent kingdom, Champa found itself needing to defend its territory to contain the threat posed by the Khmer Empire in the west, and expand its territory to the north, hoping to conquer Đại Việt. In Đại Việt, with the kingdom in turmoil following the assassination of Đinh Tiên Hoàng, Champa made an unsuccessful attempt to invade Đại Việt in 979 possibly with diplomatic encouragement from China, and failed due to the defence of Đại Việt territory under the command of Lê Hoàn. In 982, escalating tensions led to Champa detaining three ambassadors sent by Emperor Lê Hoàn of the Đại Việt (founder of the Early Lê dynasty) were detained in Indrapura. Lê Hoàn decided to go on the offensive, sacking Indrapura and killing the Cham King Parameshvaravarman I. As a result of these setbacks, the Cham eventually abandoned Indrapura around 1000 AD.

The Điện Hải Citadel was first built in 1813 as an earthen fortress located to the north of its later position, with An Hải citadel on the east bank built by Emperor Gia Long to protect the port, and by 1819, both Điện Hải and An Hải citadels had been rebuilt in brick. In 1823, Gia Long's son and successor Minh Mạng rebuilt the original Điện Hải fortress on a mound at the later location, being upgraded from a fortress (đồn) to a citadel (thành) in 1835.

=== Western contact ===
One of the first Europeans to visit Da Nang was Portuguese explorer António de Faria, who anchored in Da Nang in 1535. Faria was one of the first Westerners to write about the area and, through his influence, Portuguese ships began to call more regularly at Hội An. Throughout the 17th and 18th centuries, French and Spanish traders and missionaries made landfall at Hội An. An American, John White, arrived at Da Nang (then called Turon) on 18 June 1819 in the brig Franklin of Salem, Massachusetts, and was advised that the country was recovering from devastating wars, and that what little goods had been produced in the area was already allocated. Other American ships arriving after were the Marmion of Boston, and the Aurora and Beverly of Salem.

Conditions were such due to the wars that they were unable to conduct trade, and the subsequent missions of East India Company agent John Crawfurd in 1823 and the two missions of Andrew Jackson's agent, American diplomat Edmund Roberts, in 1833 and 1836 were unable to secure trade agreements due to the "exceptionally poor quality" of the port. Following the edict of Emperor Minh Mạng in 1835, prohibiting European vessels from making landfall or pursuing trade except at Đà Nẵng, its port superseded Hội An as the largest commercial port in the central region.

=== French Indochina ===
In 1847, French vessels dispatched by Admiral Cécille bombarded Đà Nẵng, ostensibly on the grounds of alleged persecution of Roman Catholic missionaries. In August 1858, once again ostensibly on the grounds of religious persecution, French troops, led by Admiral Charles Rigault de Genouilly, and under the orders of Napoleon III, landed in Đà Nẵng as part of the punitive Cochinchina Campaign.

The French overpowered the Vietnamese stationed in Da Nang, occupying the city and Tiên Sa peninsula. The occupying forces were placed under siege by the Vietnamese army under the command of Nguyễn Tri Phương, and were eventually forced to retreat in March 1860. The French were able to invade the southern stronghold of Saigon and, in June 1862, some provinces of southern Vietnam were ceded to the French as Cochinchina with the signing of the Treaty of Saigon.

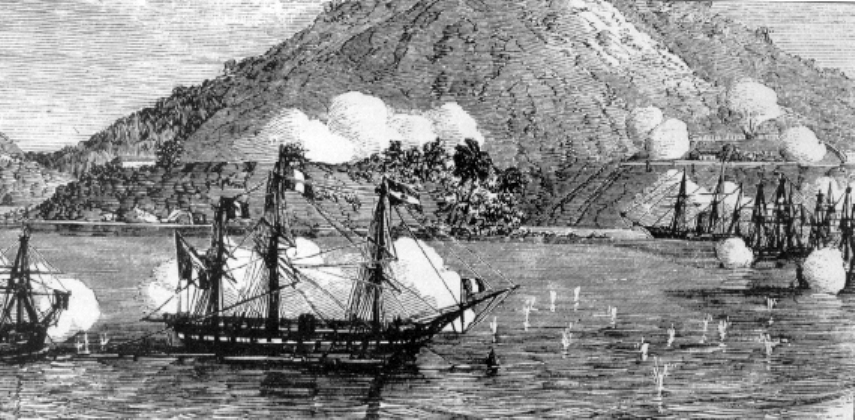
French warships off Đà Nẵng (Tourane) September 1858. What started as a punitive campaign against the Vietnamese, had turned into a defeat for the Franco-Spanish Force.

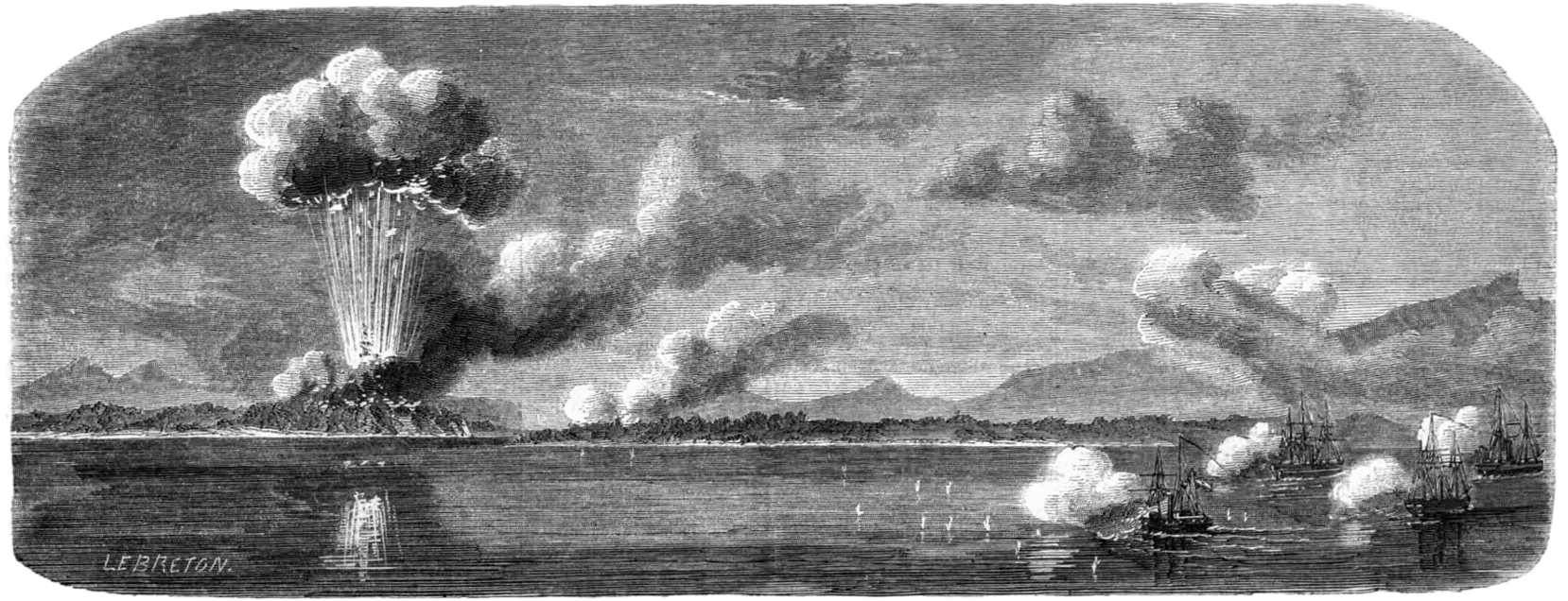
Bombardment of An Hải citadel and Điện Hải citadel by Franco-Spain Alliance.

Franco-Spain alliance landed on Hàn River, Đà Nẵng in morning, 2/9/1858

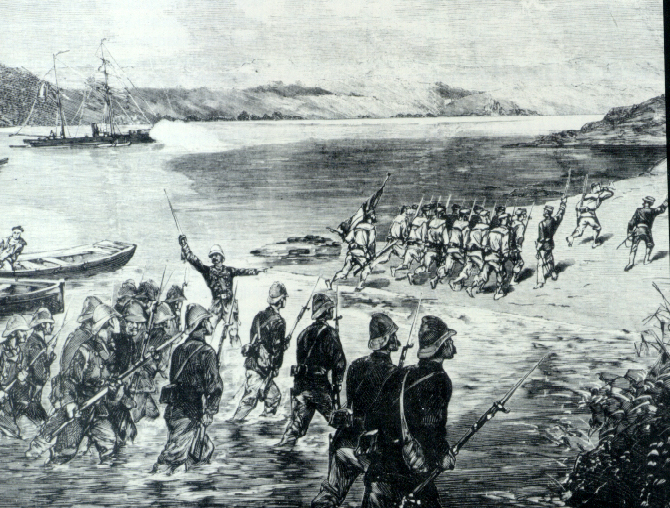
French marine landed on Da Nang

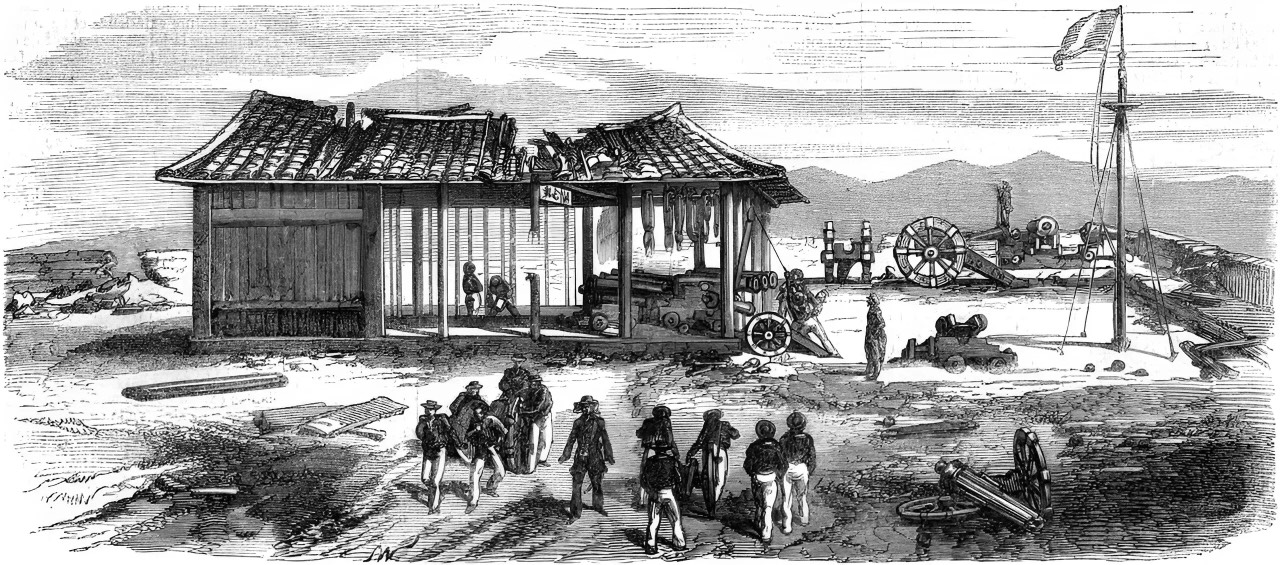
Điện Hải citadel after bombardment at 10 AM 2/9/1858, gun storage seized by French navy.

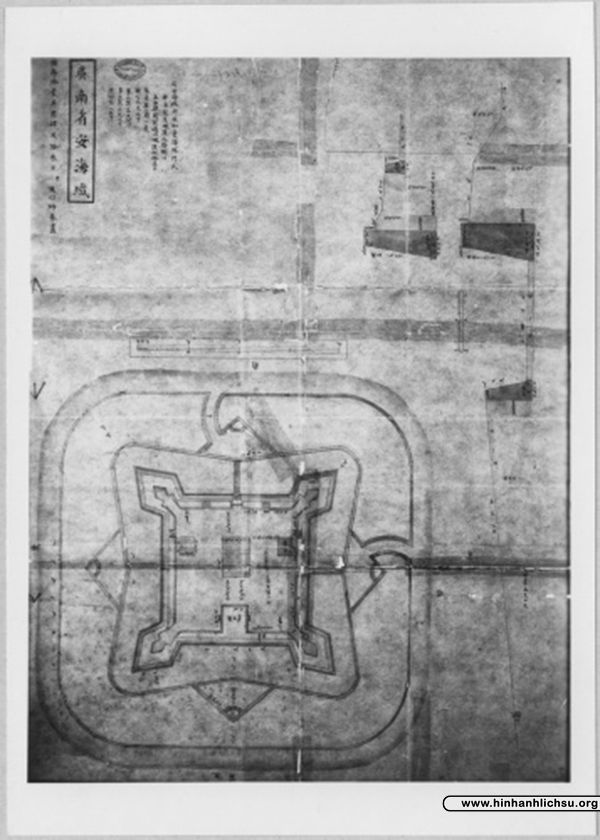
Plan of An Hải citadel in 1831

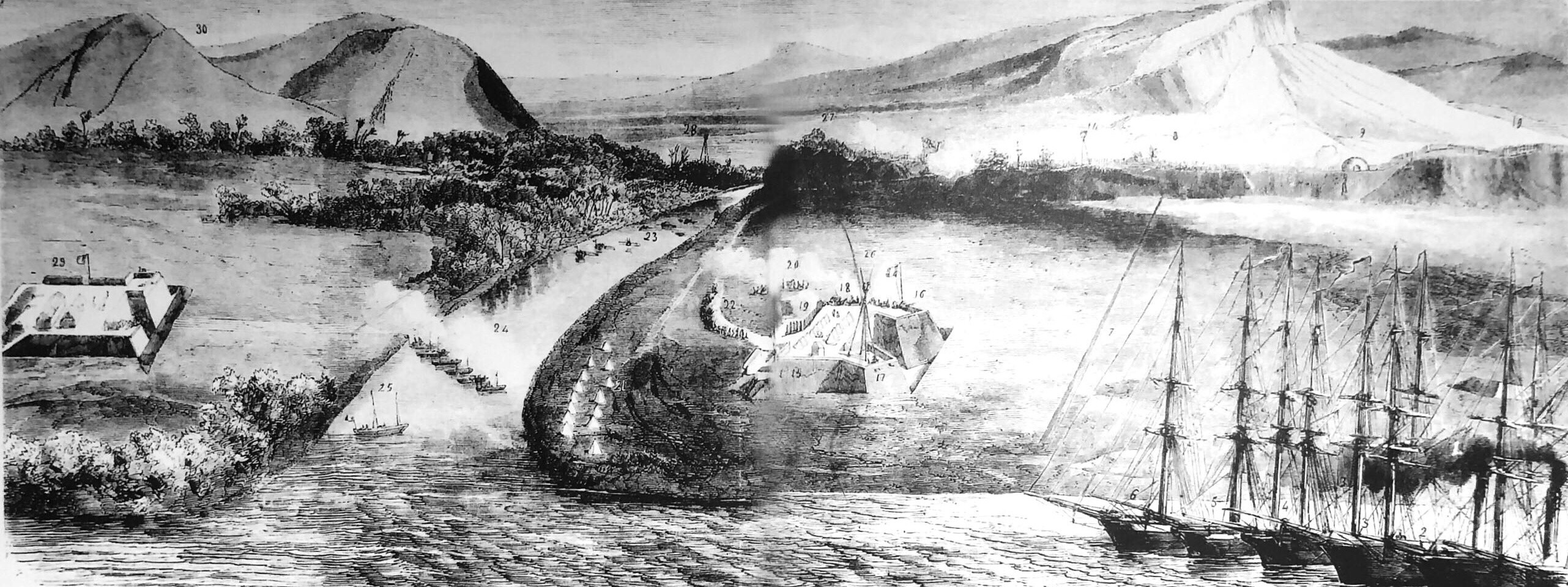
An Hải citadel (left) and Điện Hải citadel (right) and French warships.

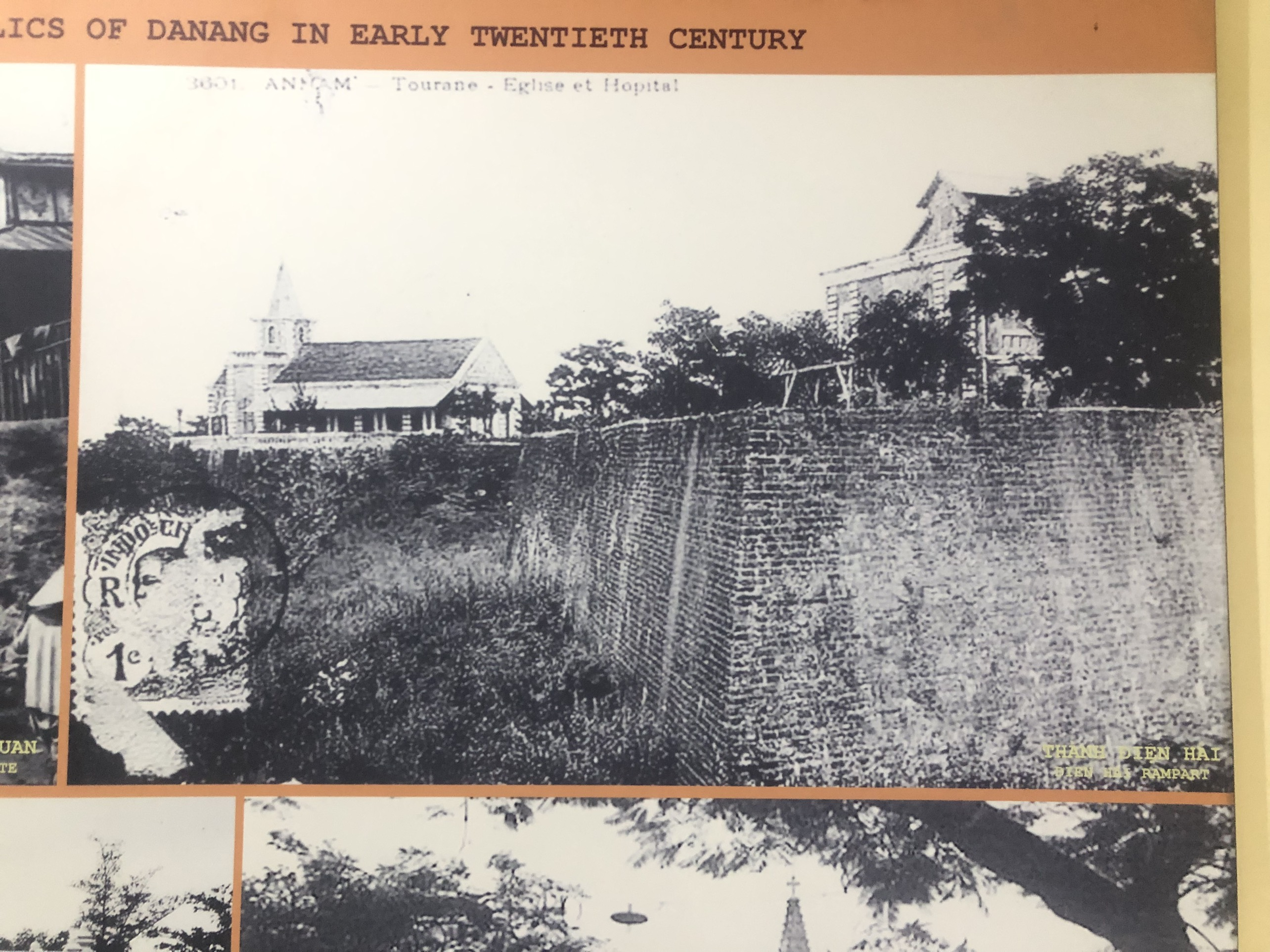
The French hospital and chapel were built in Dien Hai citadel in the 20th century

Through two more decades of conflict, the French gradually strengthened their hold on Vietnam, culminating in the establishment of French Indochina in October 1887. Two years later, in 1889, the French colonists renamed the city Tourane, placing it under the control of the governor general of French Indochina.

In 1903, the colonial government authorised Société des docks et houillères de Tourane to proceed with the tramway construction, with its preliminary 9.5-kilometre stretch (between Observatory Point and Tourane Mỹ Khê) being opened on 9 November 1905. Under the state management, "Tramway de l’Îlot de l’Observatoire" opened to the public on 1 October 1907, stretching to Faifo (Hoi An) via Montagne de Marbre (Marble Mountains), operating until 31 December 1915.

=== Republic of Vietnam ===
Army Map Service map of Da Nang, 1970

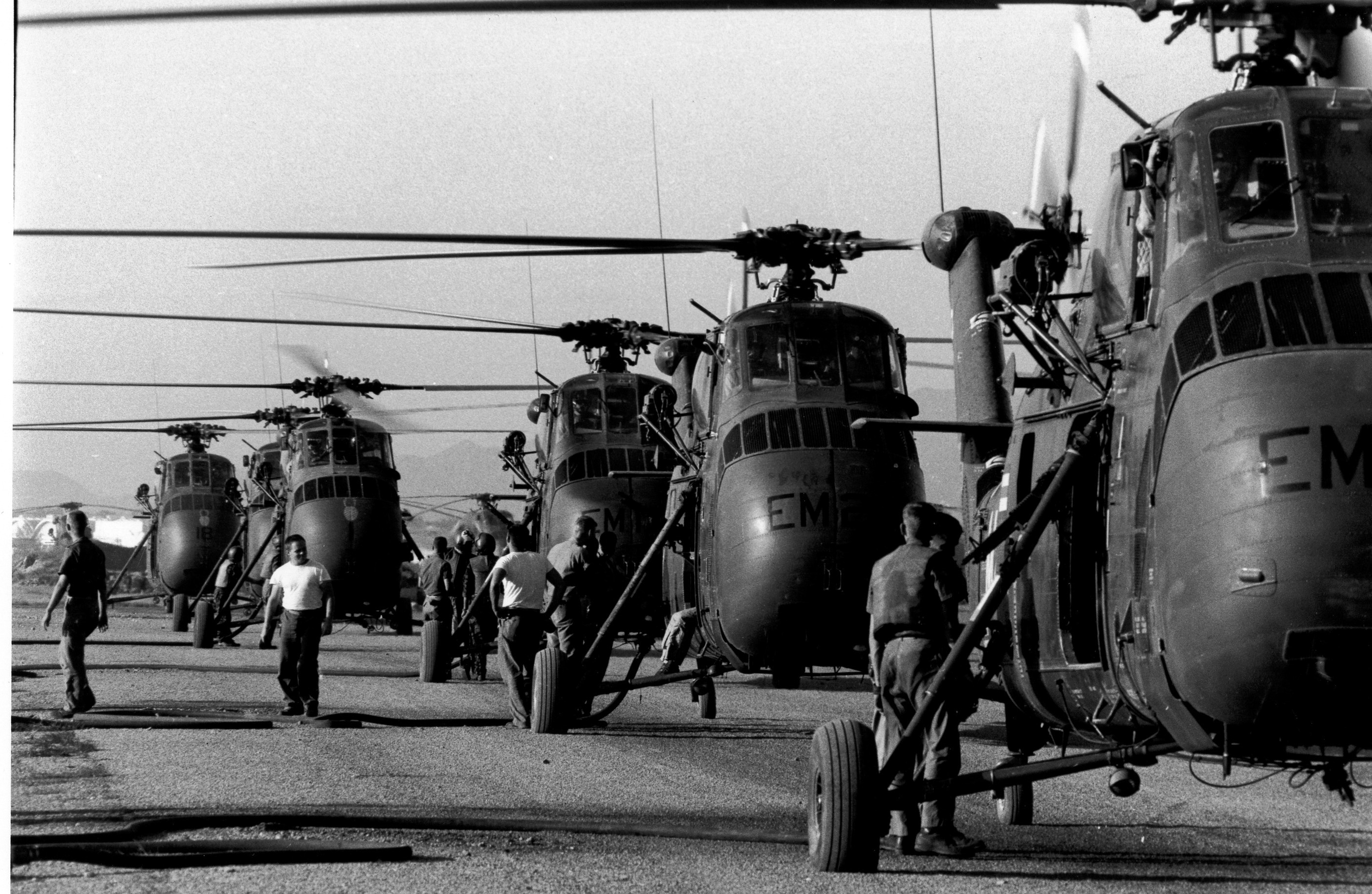
U.S. helicopters at Da Nang Air Base, 1965

During the Vietnam War, what is later the Da Nang International Airport was the air base used by the South Vietnamese and United States Air Forces. The base became "one of the world's busiest aircraft hubs" during the war, reaching an average of 2,595 aircraft traffic operations daily, more than any other airport and airbase in the world at that time.

Marble Mountain Air Facility, constructed in 1965, was located in Da Nang.

=== Socialist Republic of Vietnam ===
Since the establishment of the Socialist Republic of Vietnam, Đà Nẵng has had more educational institutions and economic sites.

On 24 October 2024, the Standing Committee of the National Assembly issued Resolution No. 1251/NQ-UBTVQH15 regarding the reorganization of district- and commune-level administrative units in Da Nang City for the 2023–2025 period (the resolution takes effect on 1 January 2025). Accordingly, a portion of the natural area and population size of Liên Chiểu district was adjusted and incorporated into Thanh Khê district.

== Geography ==
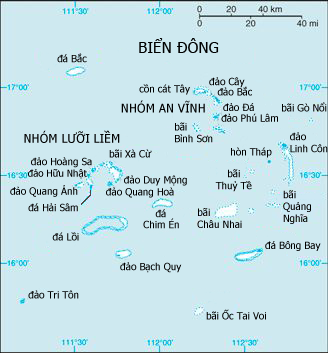
Paracel Islands (Vietnamese names)

Da Nang is surrounded by mountains to the west, and the South China Sea to the east. The central city is bisected by the Han River. Da Nang borders Huế across the Hải Vân Pass to the north. It is 764 km (475 mi) south of Hanoi, and 964 km (599 mi) north of Ho Chi Minh City. The city has a total land area of 1,283.42 km^{2} (495.53 sq mi).

Geologically, Da Nang is at the edge of a Paleozoic fold belt known as the Truong Son Orogenic Zone, whose main deformation occurred during the Carboniferous period. Da Nang's topography is dominated by the Annamite Range to the north and north-west, which features peaks ranging from 700 to 1,500 m (2,300 to 4,900 ft) in height, and coastal plains with some salting to the south and east, with white sand beaches along the coast.

Da Nang has a tropical monsoon climate with two seasons: a typhoon and wet season from September to December and a dry season from January to August. Temperatures have an annual average of around 26 °C (79 °F). Cold waves can occur. Temperatures are highest between June and August with mean temperatures of 28 to 30 °C (82 to 86 °F), and lowest between December and February (mean temperature of 18 to 23 °C (64 to 73 °F)). In Ba Na Hills, the temperatures are lower with an annual average of 20 °C (68 °F). The annual average for humidity is 81%, with highs between October and January (reaching 84–86%) and lows between June and August (reaching 75–77%). On average, Da Nang receives 2,205 mm (86.8 in) of rainfall. Rainfall is highest between September and November (ranging from 550 to 1,000 mm (22 to 39 in)) and lowest between February and April (ranging from 23 to 40 mm (0.91 to 1.57 in)). Da Nang receives an average of 2162 hours of sunlight annually, with highs between 234 and 277 hours per month in May and June and lows between 69 and 165 hours per month in November and December.

Climate data for Da Nang
| Month | Jan | Feb | Mar | Apr | May | Jun | Jul | Aug | Sep | Oct | Nov | Dec | Year |
|---|---|---|---|---|---|---|---|---|---|---|---|---|---|
| Record high °C (°F) | 34.5 (94.1) | 37.0 (98.6) | 39.9 (103.8) | 40.7 (105.3) | 41.5 (106.7) | 40.4 (104.7) | 40.6 (105.1) | 40.2 (104.4) | 38.6 (101.5) | 35.8 (96.4) | 32.8 (91.0) | 31.2 (88.2) | 41.5 (106.7) |
| Mean daily maximum °C (°F) | 25.0 (77.0) | 26.2 (79.2) | 28.3 (82.9) | 31.0 (87.8) | 33.3 (91.9) | 34.5 (94.1) | 34.4 (93.9) | 33.9 (93.0) | 31.8 (89.2) | 29.5 (85.1) | 27.4 (81.3) | 25.1 (77.2) | 30.0 (86.0) |
| Daily mean °C (°F) | 21.5 (70.7) | 22.4 (72.3) | 24.2 (75.6) | 26.5 (79.7) | 28.4 (83.1) | 29.4 (84.9) | 29.3 (84.7) | 29.0 (84.2) | 27.6 (81.7) | 26.0 (78.8) | 24.4 (75.9) | 22.2 (72.0) | 25.9 (78.6) |
| Mean daily minimum °C (°F) | 19.3 (66.7) | 20.2 (68.4) | 21.8 (71.2) | 23.8 (74.8) | 25.2 (77.4) | 26.0 (78.8) | 25.7 (78.3) | 25.6 (78.1) | 24.5 (76.1) | 23.5 (74.3) | 22.1 (71.8) | 20.0 (68.0) | 23.1 (73.6) |
| Record low °C (°F) | 10.2 (50.4) | 13.1 (55.6) | 12.7 (54.9) | 16.7 (62.1) | 20.6 (69.1) | 21.6 (70.9) | 21.1 (70.0) | 20.4 (68.7) | 19.8 (67.6) | 15.1 (59.2) | 13.3 (55.9) | 9.2 (48.6) | 9.2 (48.6) |
| Average rainfall mm (inches) | 81.9 (3.22) | 23.6 (0.93) | 25.0 (0.98) | 35.3 (1.39) | 81.1 (3.19) | 82.6 (3.25) | 92.5 (3.64) | 141.2 (5.56) | 350.7 (13.81) | 628.0 (24.72) | 448.2 (17.65) | 218.4 (8.60) | 2,205 (86.81) |
| Average rainy days | 12.0 | 5.6 | 4.8 | 5.4 | 9.2 | 8.1 | 9.4 | 11.6 | 14.6 | 20.0 | 20.3 | 18.7 | 139.1 |
| Average relative humidity (%) | 84.2 | 83.9 | 83.7 | 82.7 | 79.3 | 76.4 | 75.8 | 77.4 | 82.1 | 84.4 | 84.7 | 85.4 | 81.7 |
| Mean monthly sunshine hours | 131.9 | 146.0 | 182.3 | 208.6 | 246.7 | 242.3 | 246.2 | 214.8 | 177.4 | 143.4 | 117.7 | 94.8 | 2,162.6 |
Source 1: Vietnam Institute for Building Science and Technology
Source 2: The Yearbook of Indochina

== Administrative divisions ==
Da Nang centrally-governed city has 94 commune-level administrative units, including 23 wards, 70 communes and 1 special zone:

- 23 wards: Hải Châu (capital), An Hải, An Khê, An Thắng, Bàn Thạnh, Cẩm Lệ, Điện Bàn, Điện Bàn Đông, Điện Bàn Bắc, Hải Vân, Hòa Cường, Hòa Khánh, Hòa Xuân, Hội An, Hội An Đông, Hội An Tây, Hương Trà, Liên Chiểu, Ngũ Hành Sơn, Quảng Phú, Sơn Trà, Tam Kỳ, Thanh Khê.
- 70 communes: A Vương, Bà Nà, Bến Giằng, Bến Hiên, Chiên Đàn, Duy Nghĩa, Duy Xuyên, Đại Lộc, Đắk Pring, Điện Bàn Tây, Đông Giang, Đồng Dương, Đức Phú, Gò Nổi, Hà Nha, Hiệp Đức, Hòa Tiến, Hòa Vang, Hùng Sơn, Khâm Đức, La Dêê, La Êê, Lãnh Ngọc, Nam Giang, Nam Phước, Nam Trà My, Nông Sơn, Núi Thành, Phú Ninh, Phú Thuận, Phước Chánh, Phước Hiệp, Phước Năng, Phước Thành, Phước Trà, Quế Phước, Quế Sơn, Quế Sơn Trung, Sông Kôn, Sông Vàng, Sơn Cẩm Hà, Tam Anh, Tam Hải, Tam Mỹ, Tam Xuân, Tân Hiệp, Tây Giang, Tây Hồ, Thạnh Bình, Thạnh Mỹ, Thăng An, Thăng Bình, Thăng Điền, Thăng Phú, Thăng Trường, Thu Bồn, Thượng Đức, Tiên Phước, Trà Đốc, Trà Giáp, Trà Leng, Trà Liên, Trà Linh, Trà My, Trà Tân, Trà Tập, Trà Vân, Việt An, Vu Gia, Xuân Phú.
- 1 special zone: Hoàng Sa.

== Demographics ==
Da Nang is the fifth-most populated city in Vietnam, with an area of 1,255.53 km^{2} (484.76 sq mi) and a population of 1,269,070 according to the update in 2024. Women make up 50.7% of Da Nang's population.

Da Nang's population has been growing at rates of between 2.5% and 3% during most of the years between 2005 and 2011, exceeding the national average of 1% to 1.2%. The growth rate rose to 3.6% in 2010 before returning to its long-term trend with 2.68% in 2011. This is the third fastest growth rate in the country after the two southern manufacturing centers Bình Dương Province (4.41%) and Đồng Nai Province (3.5%). Migration has been the dominant factor in the city's population growth at least since 2009, contributing 1.6% to 2.7% (2010) between 2009 and 2011. Out-migration in 2011 was at 0.79% compared to 0.34% and 0.55% in previous years, while the in-migration rate has been exceeding 2% since 2009 and was at 2.28% in 2011. Đà Nẵng's crude birth rate was recorded at 18 live births per 1000 persons. The crude death rate was measured at 6.7 per 1000 persons in 2011. Life expectancy at birth was estimated at 77.4 years for women and 72.4 years for men, or 74.8 years overall in the 2009 population census. The infant mortality rate was measured at 9.9 infant deaths per 1000 live births.

The city has the highest urbanization ratio among provinces and municipalities in Vietnam, containing 11 rural communes, the fewest of any province-level unit in Vietnam. As of 2009, 86.9% of Đà Nẵng's population lived in urban areas; average annual urban population growth was 3.5%.

=== Ethnicities and religions ===
There are over 37 ethnicities and foreigners living together in the city. Among them, the Kinh ethnic group is the largest with 883,343 people, followed by the Hoa people with 2,974 people, the Co Tu ethnic group with 1,198 people, and other minority ethnic groups such as the Tay with 224 people, the Ede with 222 people, the Muong with 183 people, and the Gia Rai with 154 people. The smallest ethnic groups are the Chơ Ro, Hani, Si La and Ơ Đu with one person each.

As of 1 April 2019, there are nine different religions in the city, with a total of 77,029 people. The largest group is Catholicism with 42,690 people, followed by Buddhism with 37,220 people, Protestantism with 3,730 people, Cao Dai with 3,249 people, and other religions such as Minh Su Dao with 53 people, Bahá'í with 34 people, Hoa Hao Buddhism with 25 people, Islam with 19 people, and the smallest group, Brahmanism, with 9 people. Da Nang is home to the first Protestant church in Vietnam, established in 1911 by missionaries from the United Evangelical Missionary Alliance (CMA).

== Economy ==
Da Nang's GDP per capita was 19 million VND in 2007. By 2009, this had increased to 27.3 million VND.

Da Nang led the Provincial Competitiveness Index rankings in 2008, 2009, and 2010 (and was second after Bình Dương Province in the three years before that), benefiting mostly from infrastructure, performance in labour training, transparency, proactive provincial leadership and lower entry costs. In the 2023 Provincial Competitiveness Index, Đà Nẵng received a score of 68.79, marking an improvement from its 2022 score of 68.52. In 2023, the province achieved its highest scores in the criteria of ‘Informal Charges’ and ‘Law and Order,’ while receiving its lowest scores in ‘Policy Bias’ and ‘Access to Land.’

| Exports | million US$ (2007) | Imports | million US$ (2007) |
|---|---|---|---|
| Total | 469.6 | Total | 522.1 |
| Textiles | 139.8 | Machinery, equipment | 237.2 |
| Aquatic products | 75.2 | Materials for garments | 77 |
| Handicraft products | 51.6 | Iron, steel | 41.6 |
| Coffee | 47.6 | Medicaments | 24.9 |
| Footwear | 17.7 | Chemical fertilizer | 22.5 |
| Rice | 8 | Motorbikes | 0.45 |

Exports increased to US$575 million in 2008, and fell back to US$475 million in 2009.

37,800 people in Da Nang were employed in agriculture, forestry and fishing as of 2007, producing 45,000t of rice and 41,000t of fish. Gross output has been decreasing during the second half of the decade. Given Da Nang having less agricultural land (9200ha as of 2007) and its location at the coast, fishing has been contributing more to the economy than agriculture, with a gross output more than twice that of agriculture.

Da Nang is a diversified industrial center, including industries such as machinery, electrics, chemicals, shipbuilding, and textiles. Specific industrial products include aquatic products, fabric, clothes, bricks, fertilizer, cement, soap, paper, and medical tablets. EADS is planning to set up an industrial park focused on the aviation industry in Da Nang. Da Nang Hi-Tech Park (DHTP), established in 2010, is one of Vietnam's three national hi-tech parks. It focuses on biotechnology, microelectronics, automation, renewable energy, IT, and environmental technology. As of 2007, Da Nang industry was dominated by the state sector, which made up 57% of gross output. This is about the same as its share in 2000. Over 80% of the state industry is centrally managed (in other words: belongs to state corporations headquartered in Hanoi). Almost half of the rest is contributed by the foreign-invested sector. Industry grew by an average of 14.8% per year from 2000 to 2007, making it the main engine of economic growth. It has the second lowest industrial growth rate in the South Central Coast (behind Khanh Hoa Province). Employment has grown at an average of 5.75%, reaching 118,900 in 2007.

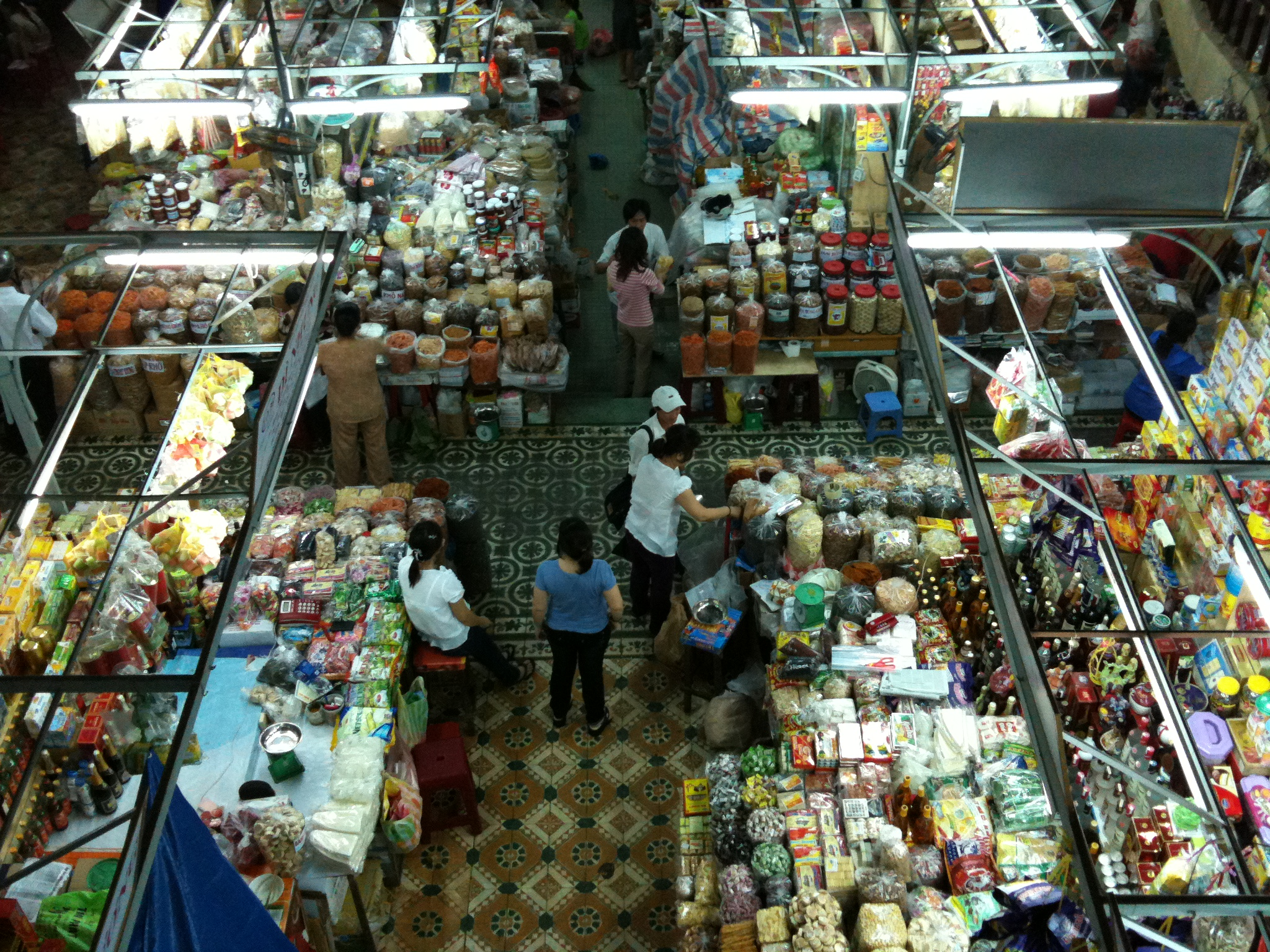
Inside Hàn Market

Historically, Da Nang's main marketplaces has been the Hàn Market, which is in the historic downtown near the west bank of the Hàn River, between Trần Phú and Bạch Đằng Streets. This market offers a variety of goods such as clothing, silk, jewelry, flowers, foodstuffs such as dried fruit and fish, and coffee, tea and wine (including snake wine). Along with it is the Cồn Market about one and a half kilometer to the west of Hàn Market famous for its food court.

Construction projects are underway in Da Nang, including beachfront resorts such as the US$130 million Hyatt Regency Danang Resort & Spa, and the Beach Resort complex (including Ocean Villas and Marriott Hotel) in Ngũ Hành Sơn. Another project, the Đa Phước International New Town aims to construct an entirely new urban area on reclaimed land on the city's north sea coast which needs US$250 million. Plans for the Đa Phước project include the erection of a hotel and smaller resorts, a 33-story apartment block and 60-story office block, an 18-hole golf course, a marina, villas and international schools.

== Tourism ==
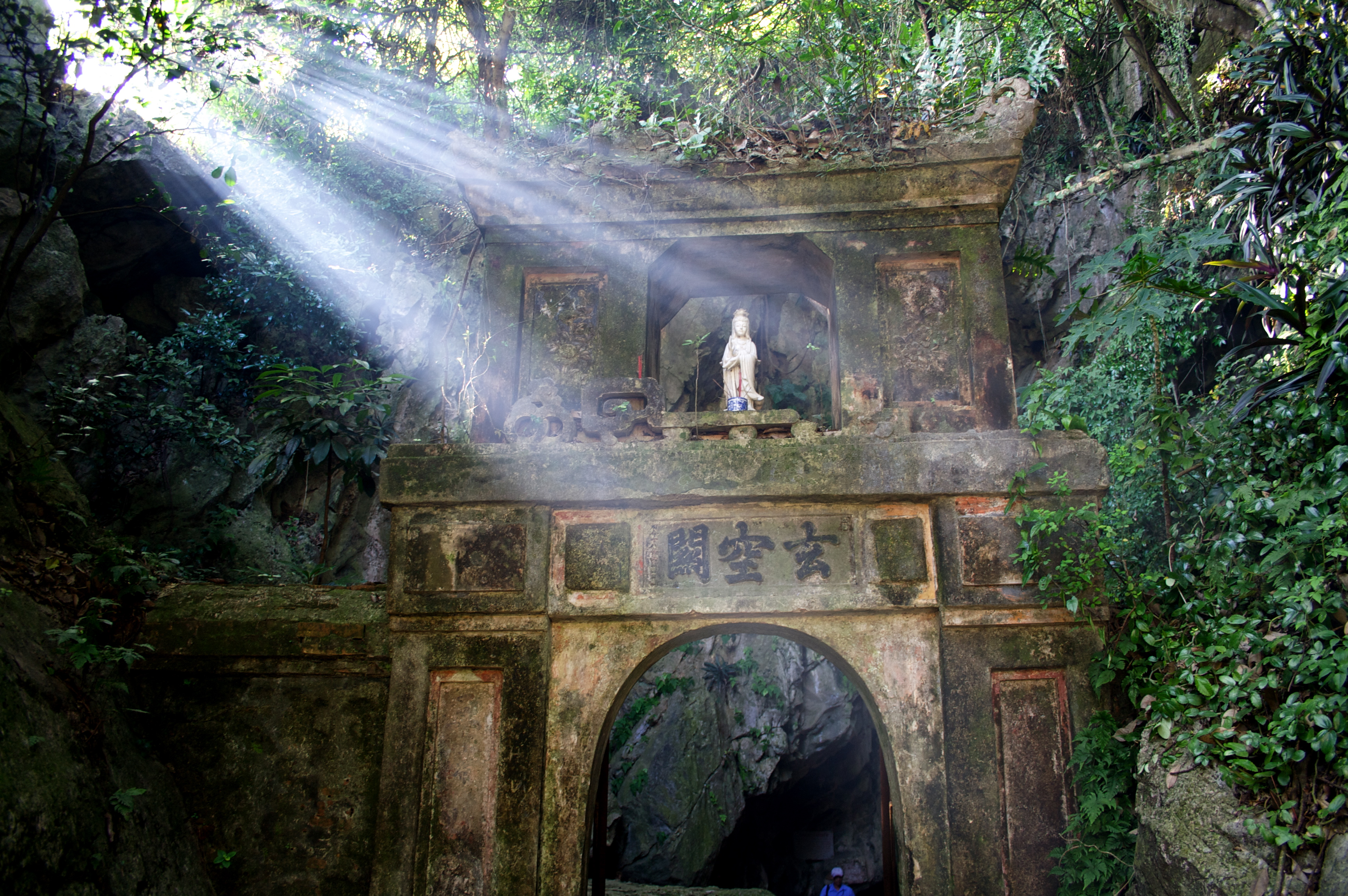
A gateway leading to Huyen Khong Cave in the Marble Mountains

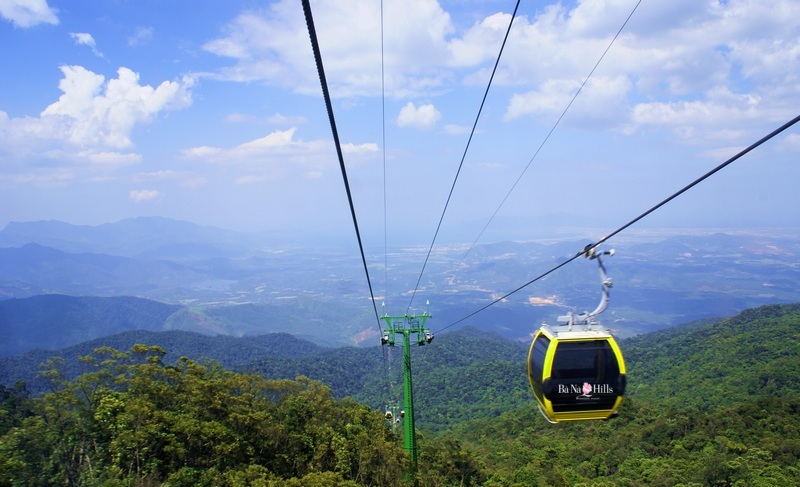
A cable car in the Bà Nà Mountains

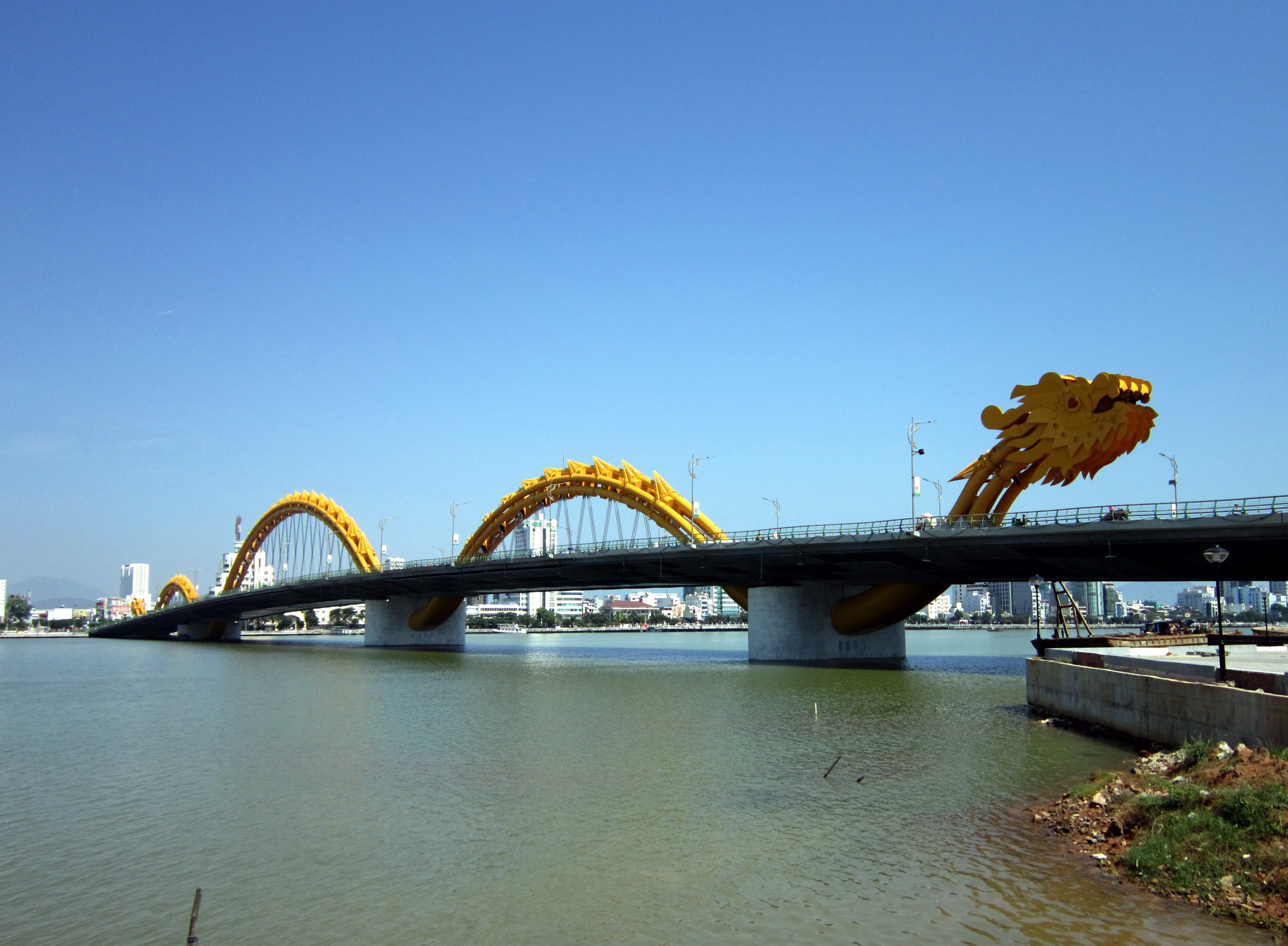
The Dragon bridge

Non Nước Beach is a white sandy beach on the outskirts of Đà Nẵng that is known for its history as an R&R destination for American troops during the Vietnam War. The beach, along with Mỹ Khê beach to the north, has resorts, surfing, and entertainment facilities. Bà Nà Hills is a mountain resort with a 5 km-long cable car system which carries guests up to Bà Nà's peak at 1487 m above sea level. Sơn Trà Mountain, miles away from the city centre with some wild streams and resorts along the seaside.

Non Nướcc stone-carving village lies at the foot of the Marble Mountains. Its traditional stone-carving craft was added to Vietnam's national intangible cultural heritage list in 2014.

The central city earned over VND19.4 trillion (US$853.96 million) in revenue, an increase of 20.6% from 2016. Statistics show that the city witnessed an increase in the number of visitors by air which stood at over 1.58 million, up 74.4% while by-car visitors via Thailand and Laos was estimated at 14,120.

In 2016, Da Nang was voted one of the top 10 resort destinations in Asia by readers of Smart Travel Asia magazine. In 2018, Da Nang was listed as one of the destinations to visit before it became too famous on the Business Insider website. According to the Japanese newspaper Nikkei, in the 2018 ranking of tourist destinations by Airbnb, Da Nang ranked 5th globally and 1st in Southeast Asia in terms of attracting tourists.

Also in 2018, the Golden Bridge phenomenon became a focal point on some newspapers. In 2019, the American newspaper New York Times praised Da Nang as "the Miami of Vietnam", ranking 15th in the list of 52 places to visit in the world.

In 2026, David D. Lee from South China Morning Post described that Da Nang is jokingly called by Korean tourists as "province of South Korea". Some signs are written in Korean and Korean music is played.

== Cuisine ==
Da Nang's culinary identity is strongly shaped by the flavors of Central Vietnam, characterized by bold, spicy, and savory profiles that distinguish the region's food from the milder cuisine of the south and the more subtle dishes of the north.

=== Local specialties ===
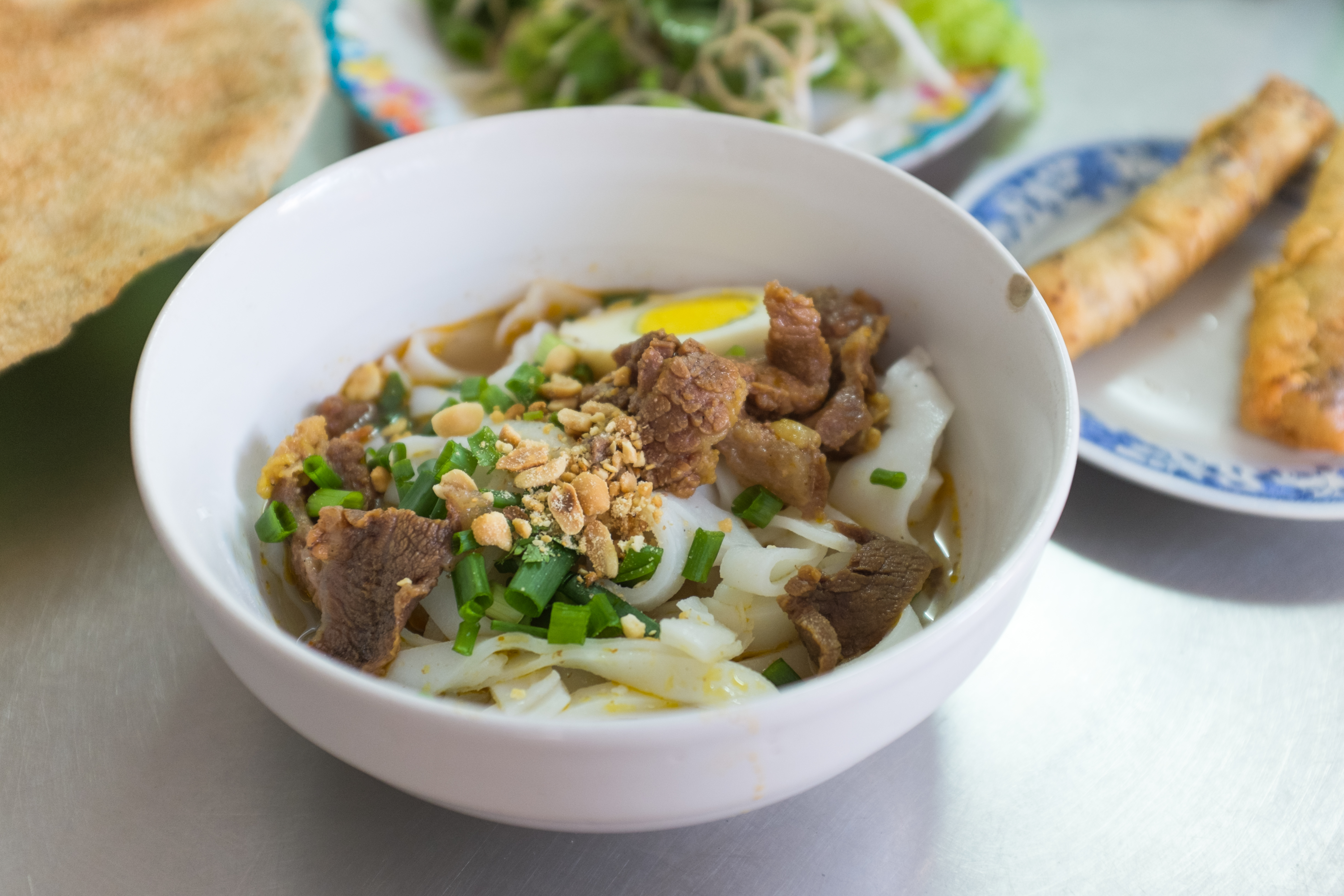
A bowl of mì Quảng with pork and egg.

The city is home to several iconic dishes deeply rooted in local tradition:

- Mì Quảng – A signature rice noodle dish served with shrimp, pork, hard-boiled egg, roasted peanuts, and fresh herbs, topped with a small amount of rich broth. It is widely regarded as the defining dish of the Quảng Nam–Đà Nẵng region.
- Bánh tráng cuốn thịt heo (Grilled rice paper with pork) – Thin, grilled rice paper rolls filled with boiled pork, fresh vegetables, green mango, and local dipping sauce. A staple of Da Nang street food culture.
- Bê thui Cầu Mống – Slow-roasted veal with golden skin, originating from Cầu Mống village in Điện Bàn district. Typically served alongside fresh rice paper, herbs, and mắm nem (fermented anchovy sauce).
- Bánh xèo (Vietnamese sizzling crêpe) – A crispy turmeric-infused rice flour crêpe stuffed with shrimp and bean sprouts, eaten wrapped in mustard greens with a sweet dipping sauce.
- Cá bống sông – A small freshwater fish species native to the Hàn and Cu Đê rivers, commonly fried or braised and served as a local delicacy.

=== Desserts and sweet culture ===
Da Nang has a well-developed dessert culture rooted in both Vietnamese tradition and French colonial influence. Traditional chè (sweet soups and puddings) remain popular throughout the city, sold at market stalls and roadside vendors. In recent years, modern dessert concepts have also gained traction, including French-inspired artisan pastries. For instance, Nutella-stuffed brioche, a nod to the city's francophone heritage, has been offered by local dessert brands.

=== Food markets and street food ===
The Hàn Market and Cồn Market are the two principal food markets in the city, offering a wide array of fresh produce, local snacks, and ready-to-eat street food. Da Nang is particularly known for its vibrant night food scene, with dozens of street vendors operating along the riverbanks and beach promenades after sunset.

== Media ==
Vietnam Television has a studio located in the Hải Châu district of the city which broadcast local news and television programmes for the Central and Central Highlands regions of Vietnam that broadcast on channel VTV8.

== Education ==
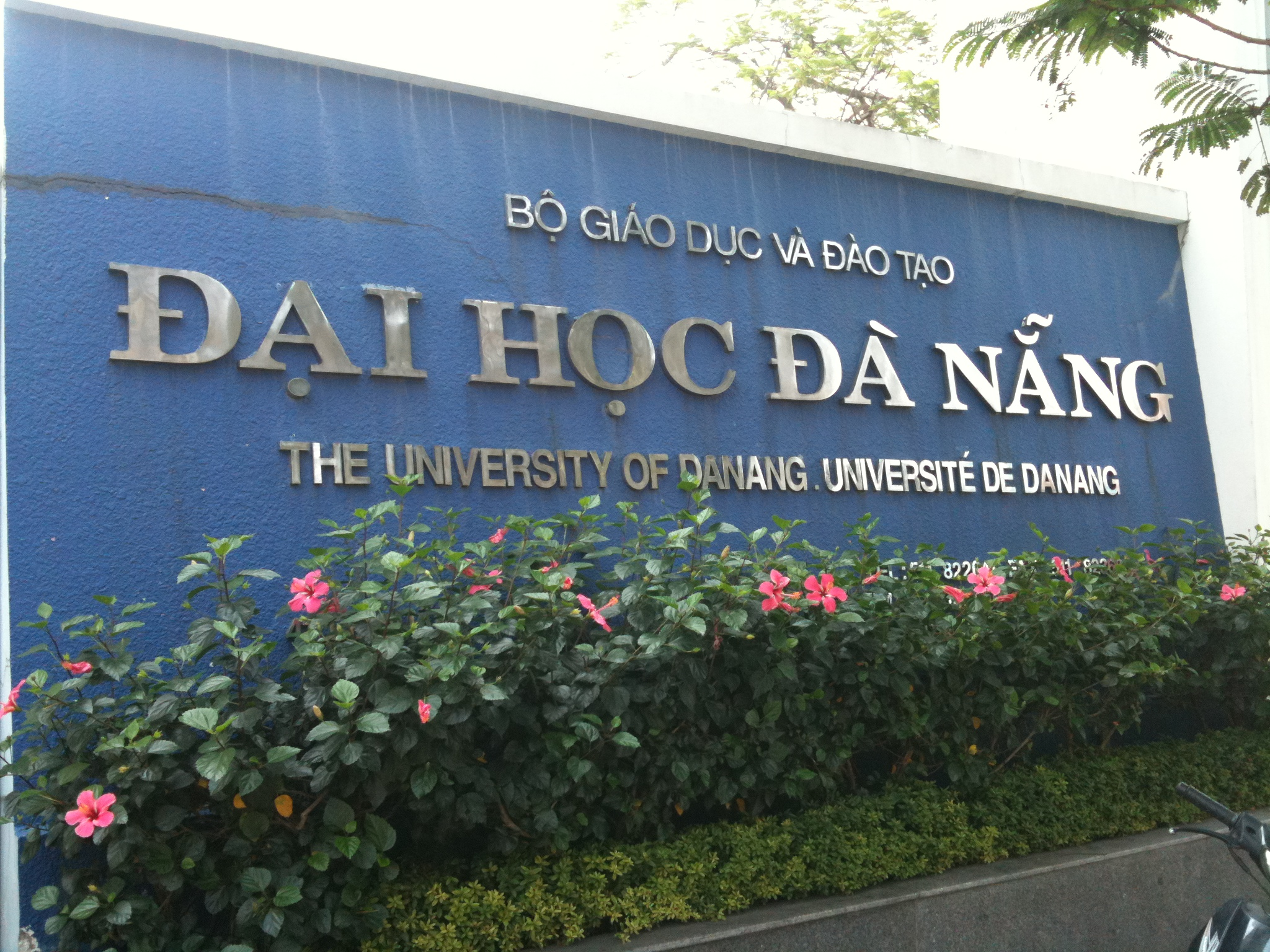
A sign at the University of Da Nang

Universities located in Da Nang include:

- University of Da Nang, with a number of member colleges:
  - Technology
  - Technology and Education
  - Economics
  - Pedagogy
  - Foreign Languages
  - Information Technology
  - Kon Tum campus
  - English Language Institute
- Da Nang University of Medical Technology, Medicine and Pharmacy
- Da Nang University of Sport
- Duy Tan University, private university
- Dong A University, private university
- Da Nang University of Architecture
- The American University of Vietnam (AUV), private university

There are overseas education representatives in Da Nang, including Campus France, a French-government agency in Da Nang, which promotes the learning of the French language and supports students in the location of study opportunities in France, and the English Language Institute.

== Healthcare ==
Da Nang's healthcare system includes a growing network of public and private hospitals that provide specialized medical services. Institutions include Da Nang Hospital, C Hospital, and Hoan My Da Nang Hospital. Da Nang is estimated to account for around 20% of Vietnam's medical tourism market, valued at approximately US$700 million.

Da Nang is said to possesses the necessary resources and infrastructure to become a regional hub for advanced medical services. In 2024, U.S. News & World Report ranked Da Nang fourth among twelve of Asia's best cities for retirement.

== Transportation ==
Đà Nẵng is at the end of the East–West Economic Corridor (EWEC), which stretches over Vietnam, Laos, Thailand, and Myanmar. The city Department of Transport has asked the city of Yokohama, Japan, to cooperate in transit-oriented development.

=== By air ===
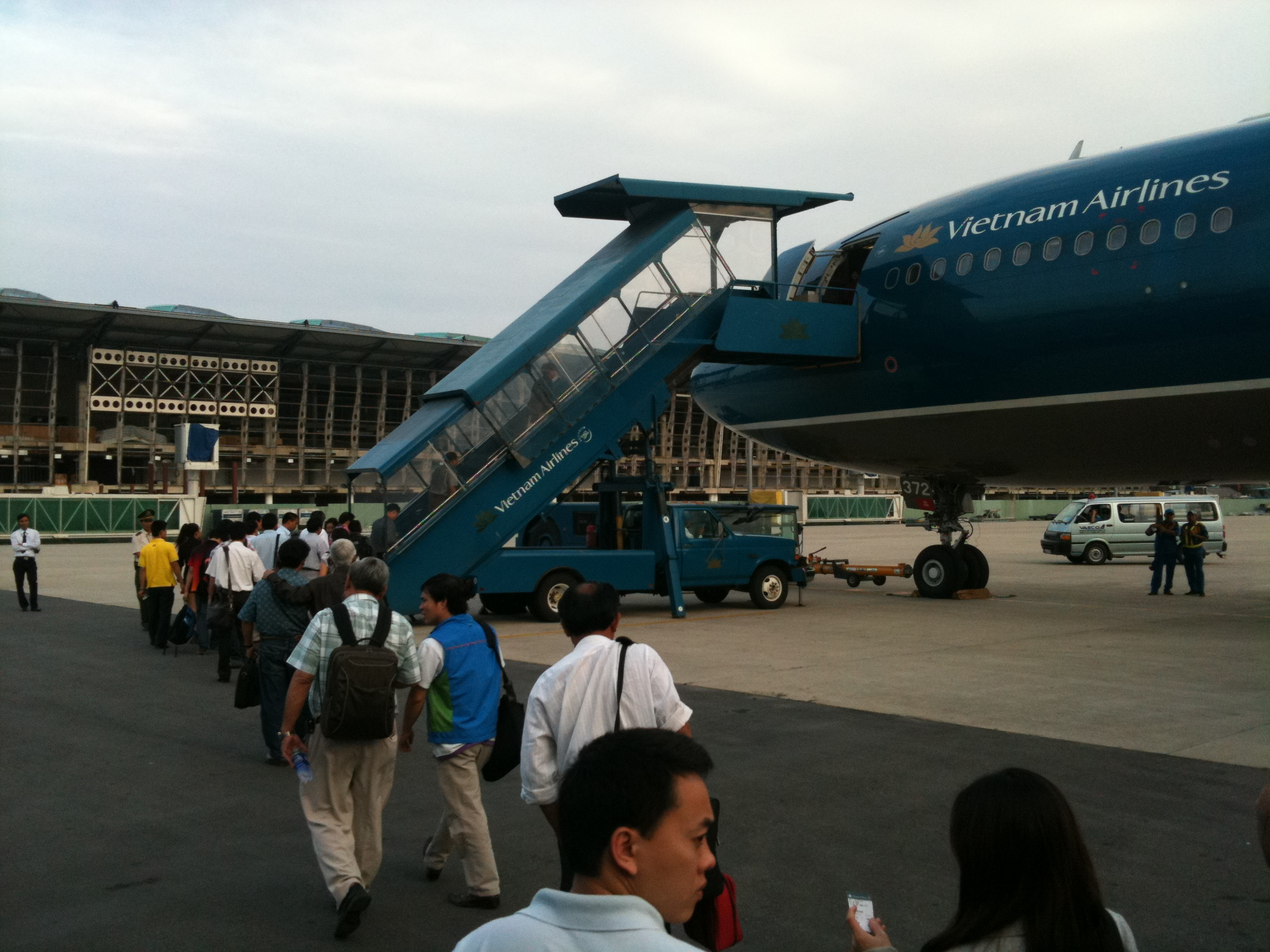
A Vietnam Airlines jet is boarded in front of a terminal of Da Nang International Airport

Da Nang International Airport, located at the centre of the city, is the third largest international airport in Vietnam. It is a gateway to access central Vietnam. The airport was known as Da Nang Air Base during the Vietnam War, during which time it was described as the world's busiest airport. As of November 2015, Da Nang International airport has been undergoing renovations.

Beginning 16 December 2011, Air Asia, a Malaysian low-cost carrier, began offering four flights a week between Đà Nẵng and Kuala Lumpur. An international terminal opened in December 2011 allowing further connections to destinations such as Phnom Penh (Cambodia), Thailand, Hong Kong, Japan, and Australia.

=== By land ===
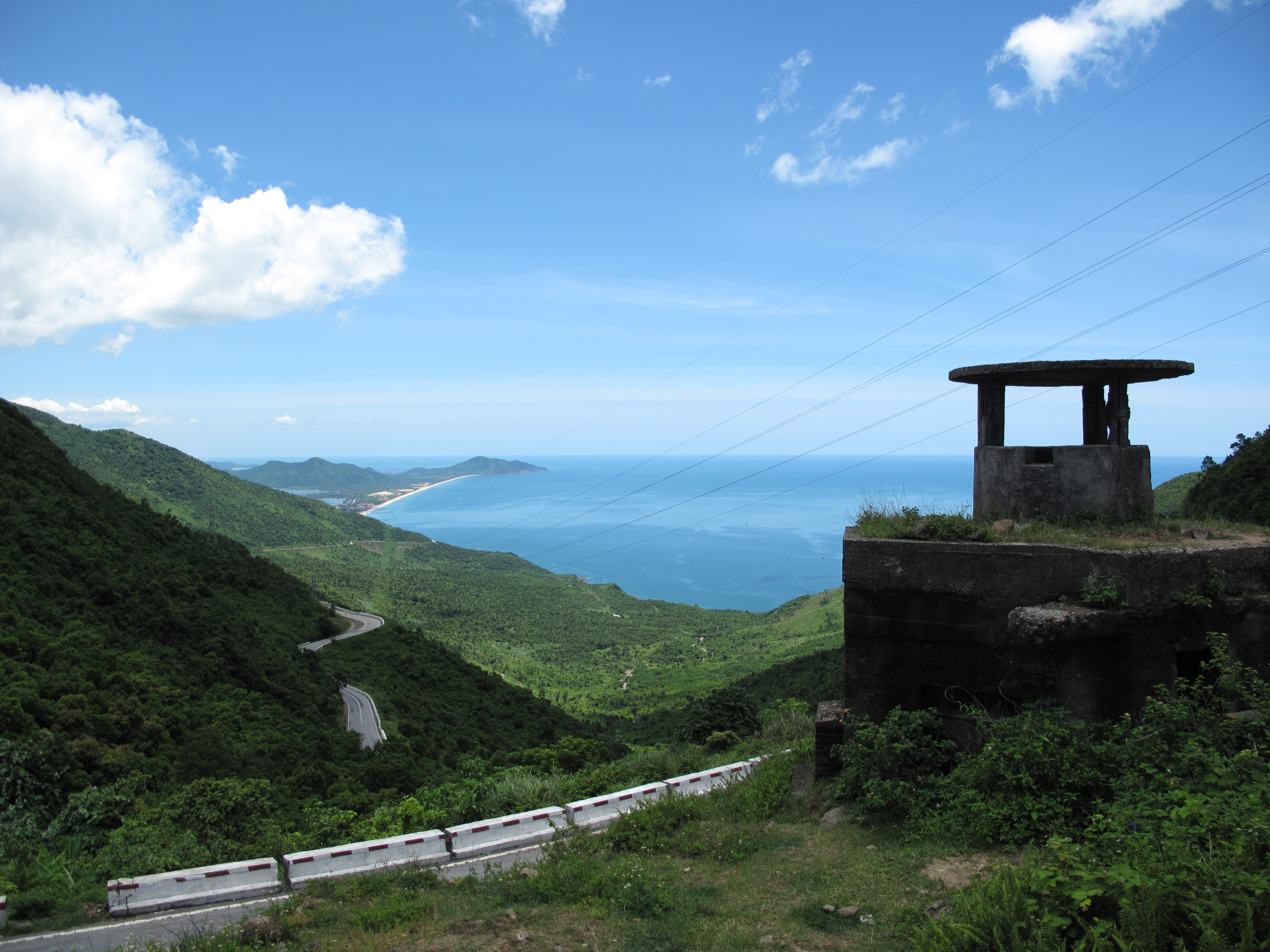
The Hải Vân Pass

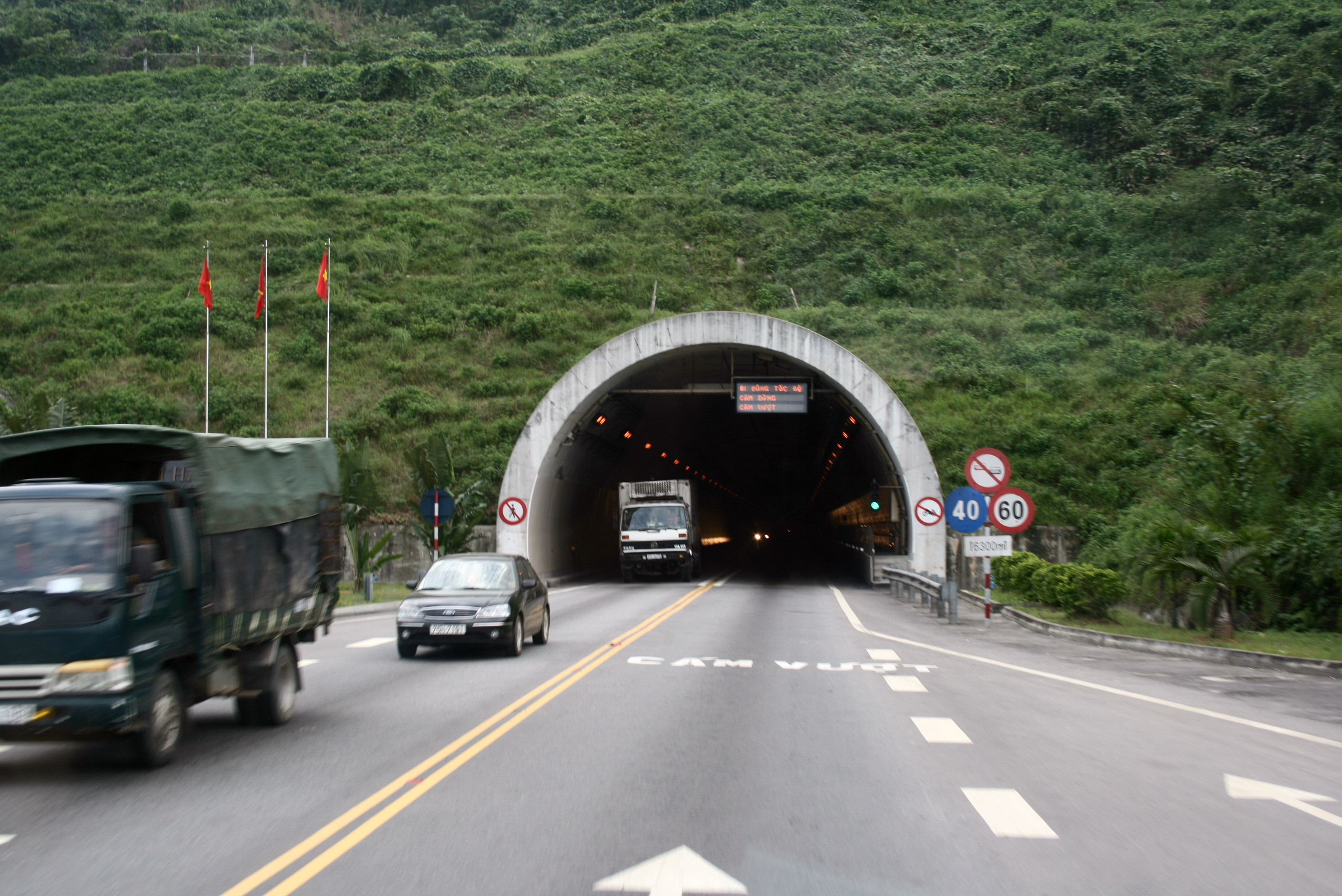
Hai Van Tunnel North Entrance

Da Nang is a station along the North–South Railway, also known as the Reunification Express.

National Highways 1 and 14B run through the city, providing road connections to Hanoi in the north and Ho Chi Minh City in the south, and the Central Highlands and Laos to the west. The Hai Pass is a mountain pass separating Da Nang and Huế, where Highway 1A passes through. To cut down on transit time and the danger to motorists from navigating the twisting mountain road, the Hải Vân Tunnel was built, opening in 2005. It is the longest tunnel in south-east Asia at 6.28 km, and allows motorists to save between 30 minutes and an hour on traveling times over the old Hải Vân Pass route. An expressway between Da Nang and Quang Ngai has completed its construction in 2018.

Bridges cross the Han River and its tributaries in Da Nang, including the iconic Han River Bridge, Tran Thi Ly Bridge, Nguyen Van Troi Bridge, Tuyen Son Bridge and Thuan Phuoc Bridge, which is the longest suspension bridge in Vietnam.

=== By sea ===
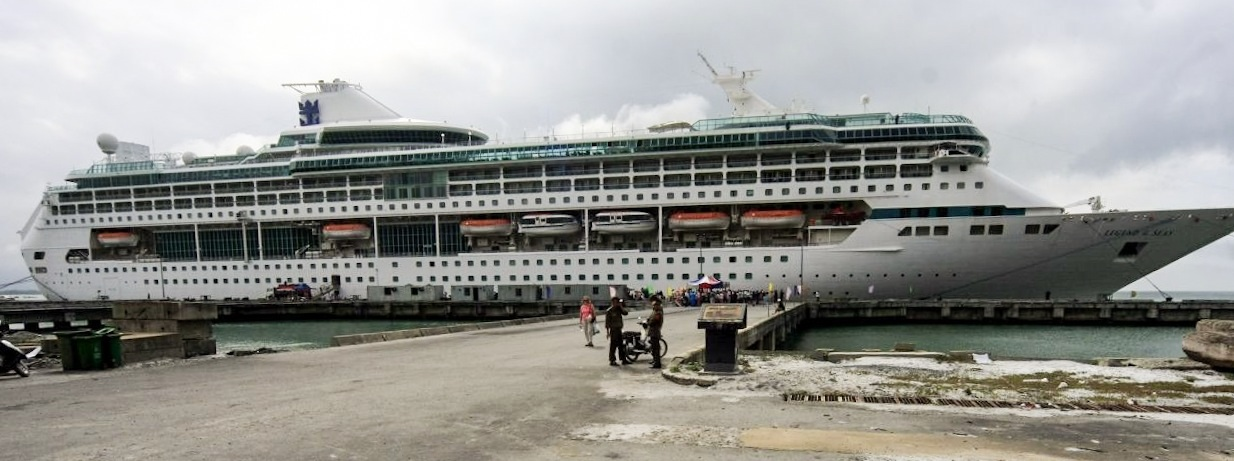
The Legend of the Seas calls at Da Nang Port in February 2009

Da Nang's port system is the third largest in Vietnam after Ho Chi Minh City and Haiphong. In 2008, Da Nang's port handled 2.7 million tons of cargo, of which 1.2 million tons were exports, 525,900 tons were imports, and 985,600 tons were domestic cargo. Over 29,600 passengers passed through the port in 2008, an increase over previous years.

The port system consists of two areas: Tiên Sa Seaport, and Sông Hàn Terminal. Tiên Sa Seaport has a navigation depth of 11 m (36 ft), and is able to receive medium range tankers of up to 45,000 DWT, and container ships and cruise ships. The approach to Sông Hàn Terminal is 12 nmi (22 km) long with a navigation depth of 6–7 m (20–23 ft), and can accommodate vessels of up to 5,000 DWT. Vietnam National Shipping Lines (Vinalines) is the port authority for Đà Nẵng's port system.

While the port's infrastructure is not specifically designed to accommodate cruise ships, the number of cruise ships docking at Da Nang Port has increased. In the first two months of 2010, 12 cruise ships docked in Da Nang, carrying 6,477 passengers.

Cruise ships also dock at Chân Mây Port.

== International relations ==
=== Twin towns – sister cities ===
Da Nang is twinned with:

- Battambang, Cambodia
- Champasak, Laos
- Changwon, South Korea
- Daegu, South Korea
- Haiphong, Vietnam
- Khon Kaen, Thailand
- Kunming, China
- Le Havre, France
- Mukdahan, Thailand
- Oakland, United States
- Pittsburgh, United States
- Savannakhet, Laos
- Tangier, Morocco
- Timișoara, Romania
- Toluca, Mexico

=== Cooperation and friendship ===
In addition to its twin towns, Da Nang cooperates with:

- Attapeu, Laos
- Borås, Sweden
- Grodno Region, Belarus
- Hwaseong, South Korea
- Houston, United States
- Kolkata, India
- Košice, Slovakia
- Macau, China
- Nantes, France
- Newcastle, Australia
- Nord Pas de Calais, France
- Queensland, Australia
- Rotterdam, Netherlands
- Sakai, Japan
- Salavan, Laos
- Salo, Finland
- Sekong, Laos
- Shandong Province, China
- South Australia, Australia
- Stuttgart, Germany
- Surat, India
- Walloon Region, Belgium
- Yaroslavl Oblast, Russia

=== Friendship port ===
- Kawasaki, Japan

=== Consulates General ===
- China
- Japan
- South Korea
- Laos
- Poland
- Russia
- Spain

== Notable persons ==
=== Miss International ===
Huỳnh Thị Thanh Thủy, Miss International 2024
