= Dragon Bridge (Da Nang) =

Bridge in Da Nang, Vietnam

Dragon Bridge Cầu Rồng
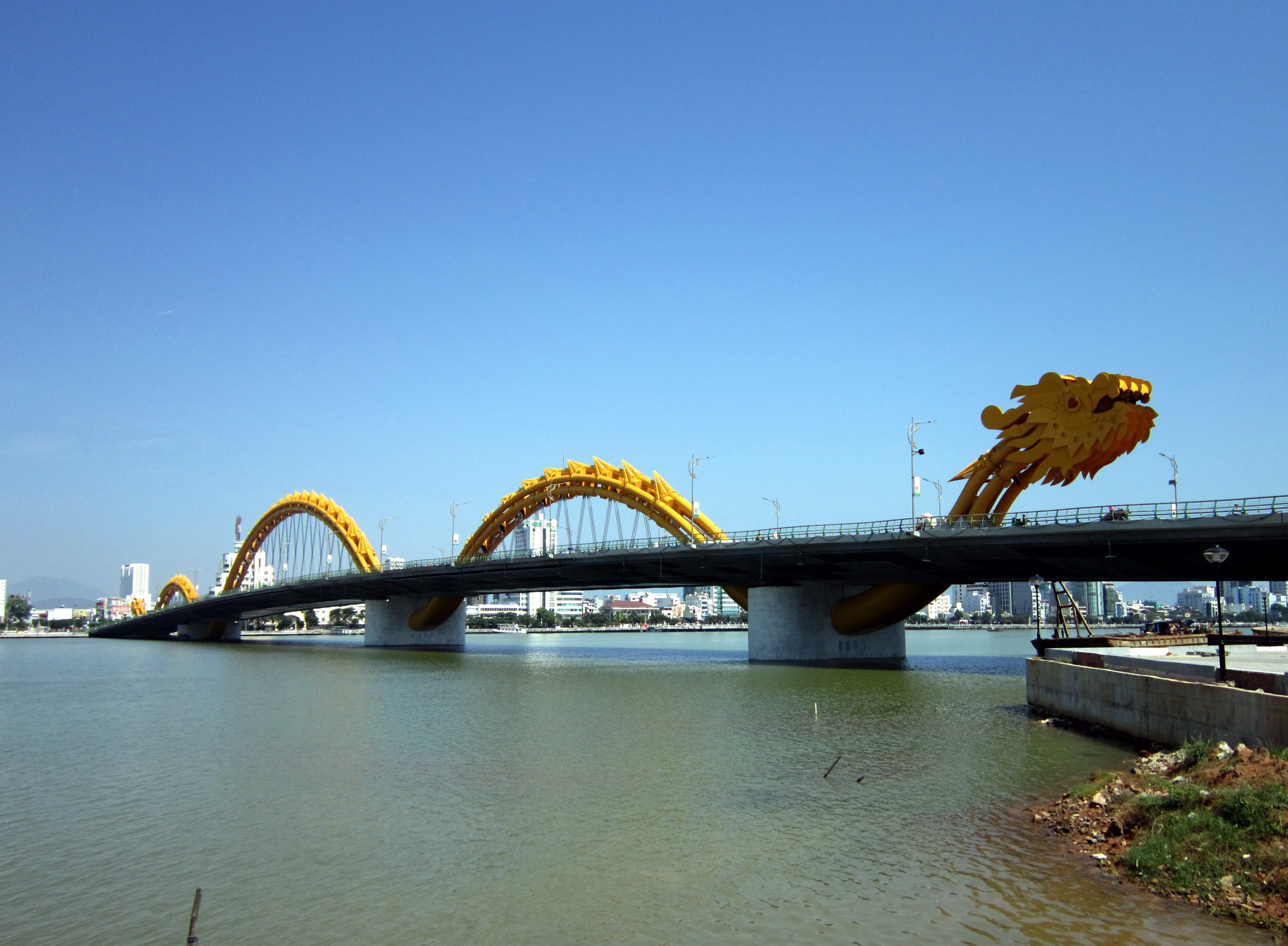
- Coordinates: 16°03′40″N 108°13′36″E
- Carries: Motor vehicles, pedestrians and cyclists
- Crosses: Han River
- Locale: Da Nang, Vietnam

Characteristics
- Material: Steel
- Total length: 666 metres (2,185 ft)
- Width: 37.5 metres (123 ft)
- Longest span: 200 metres (660 ft)
- Clearance below: 7 metres (23 ft)

History
- Designer: Ammann & Whitney
- Constructed by: Company No. 508, an affiliate of Civil Construction Engineering Corporation No.5, and Bridge Company No. 75. Civil Engineering Corporation No. 1 construction main structure ( Pier, main girder, arch)
- Construction start: 19 July 2009
- Construction end: 29 March 2013

Location
- Interactive map of Dragon Bridge

The Dragon Bridge (Vietnamese: Cầu Rồng) is a bridge with an arch-beam-wire combination steel structure in the shape of a dragon crossing the River Hàn in Da Nang, Vietnam. It is the world's largest dragon-shaped steel bridge.

== Location ==
This modern bridge crosses the Han River at the Le Dinh Duong/Bach Dang traffic circle, providing the shortest road link from the Da Nang International Airport to other main roads in Da Nang city, and a more direct route to My Khe Beach and Non Nuoc Beach on the eastern edge of the city.

== Design ==
The bridge was designed and built in the shape of a dragon and to breathe fire and water each Saturday and Sunday night at 9 pm. The bridge was designed by the US-based Ammann & Whitney Consulting Engineers with Louis Berger Group. Construction was undertaken by Company No. 508, an affiliate of Civil Construction Engineering Corporation No.5, and Bridge Company No. 75.

== Construction ==
Construction of the bridge began on 19 July 2009 (the same day as the inauguration of the nearby Thuận Phước Bridge) when former prime minister of Vietnam Nguyen Tan Dung and many high-ranking government officials attended the groundbreaking ceremony.

Dragon Bridge is 666m long, 37.5m wide and has six lanes for traffic. It cost nearly VND 1.5 trillion dong (US$88m).

== Opening ==
The main span was completed on October 26, 2012. The bridge was opened to traffic on March 29, 2013, the 38th anniversary of the capture of Da Nang City by North Vietnamese forces (known as the Liberation of Da Nang in Vietnam) during the Vietnam War (known as the American War in Vietnam).

== Gallery ==
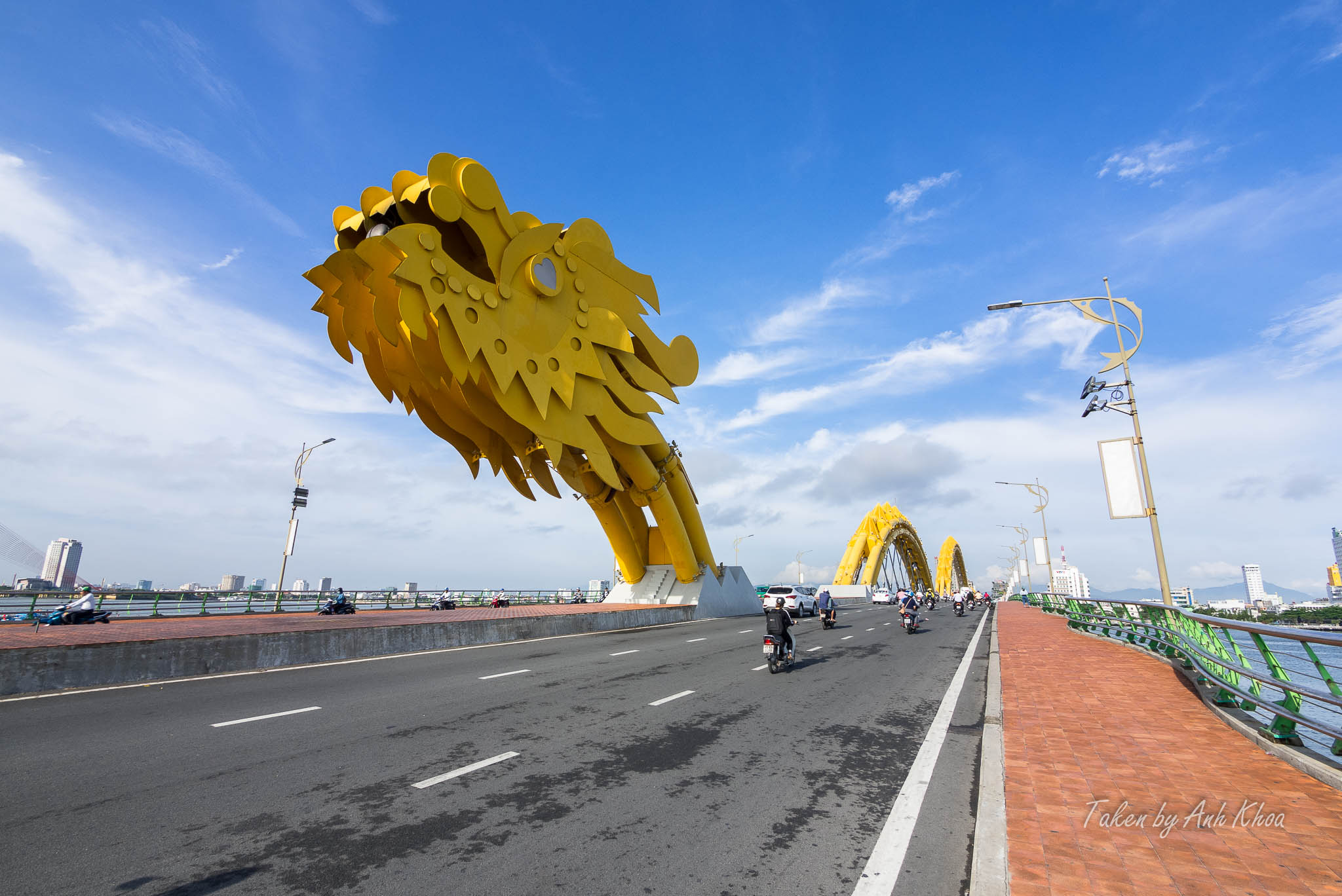
Dragon head, looking west from the Dragon Bridge

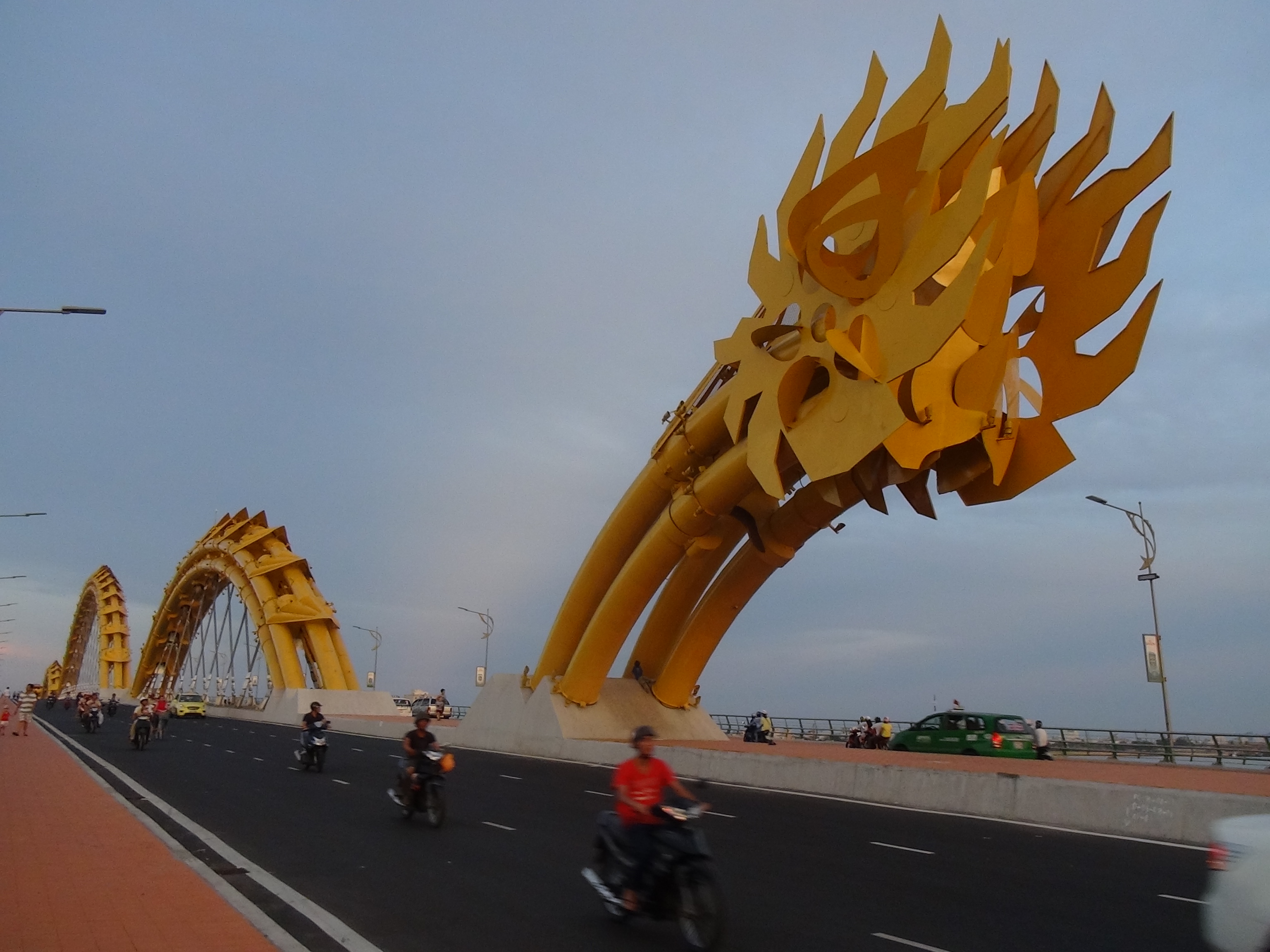
Dragon tail, looking east from the Dragon Bridge

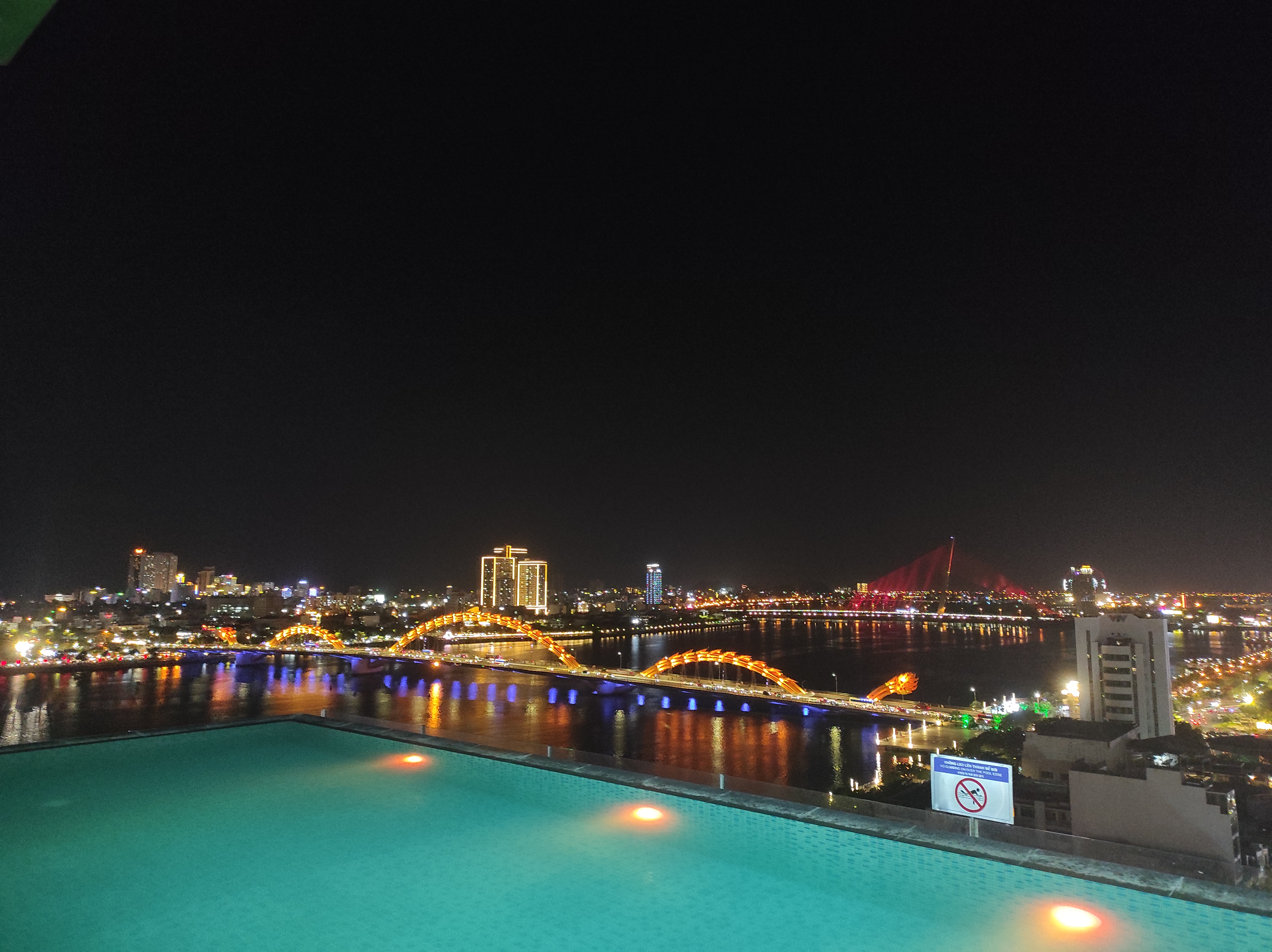
Aerial view: Dragon Bridge at night, looking northwest

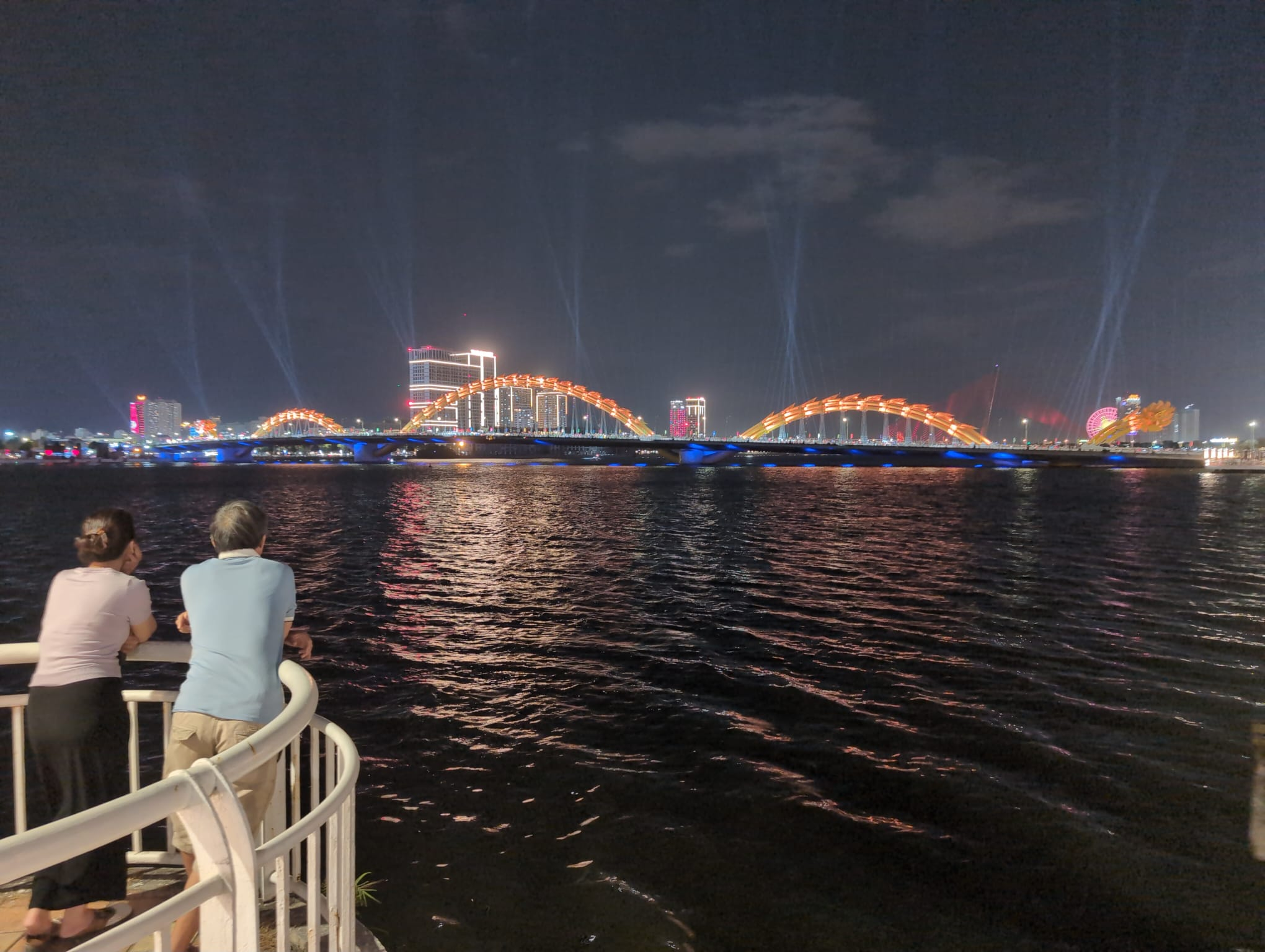
Dragon Bridge on evening of Reunification anniversary, 2026 04 30

== See also ==
- Han River Bridge
- Thuận Phước Bridge
- Trần Thị Lý Bridge
