= Trần Thị Lý =

Vietnamese revolutionary (1933–1992)

Trần Thị Lý (née Trần Thị Nhâm, 30 December 1933 in Điện Quang, Điện Bàn District, Quảng Nam – 20 November 1992 in Đà Nẵng) was a Vietnamese communist party member, who was imprisoned and tortured in Saigon. She is the granddaughter of Trần Cao Vân.

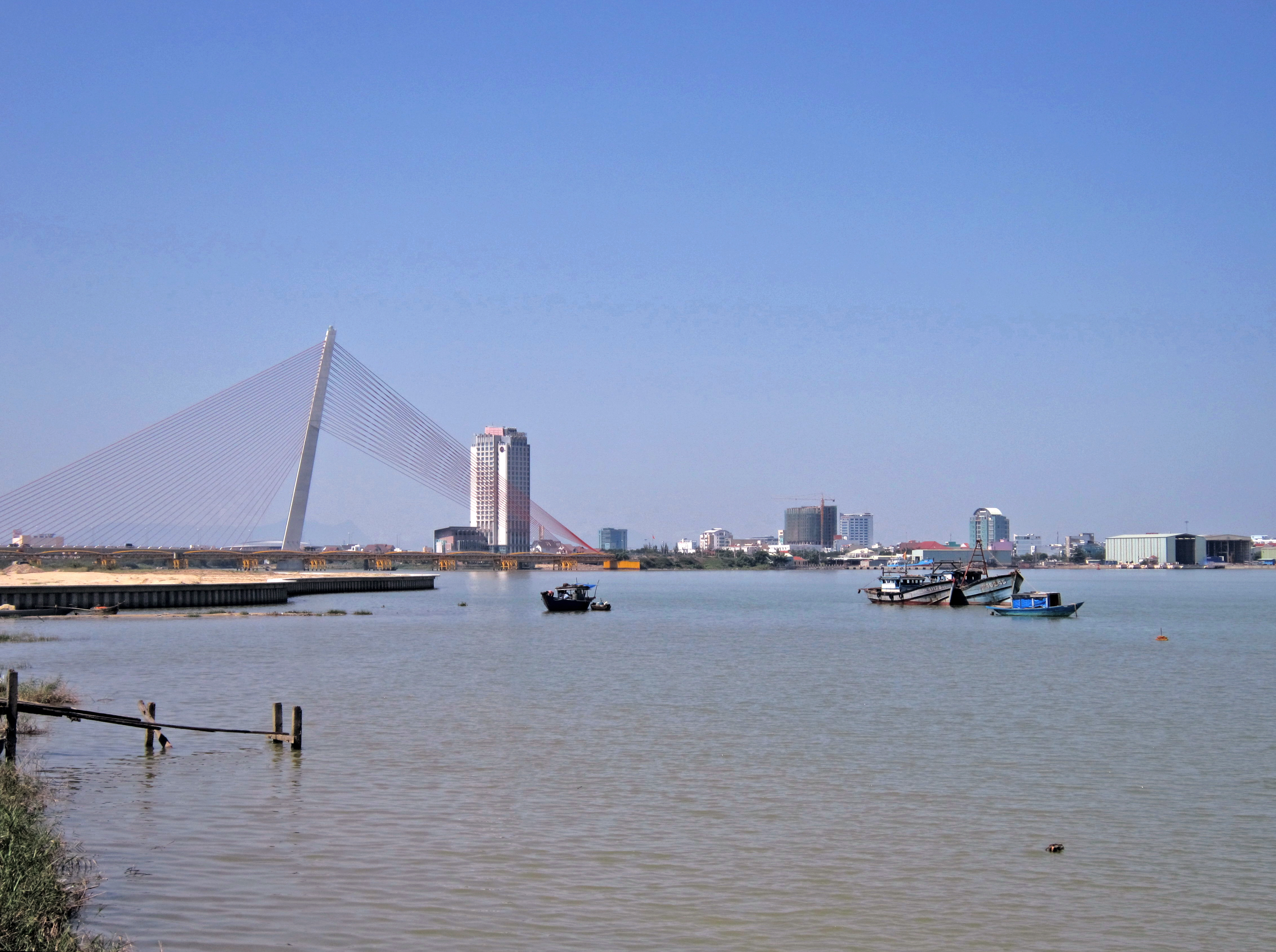
Nguyễn Văn Trỗi – Trần Thị Lý Bridge in Da Nang

The Nguyễn Văn Trỗi – Trần Thị Lý Bridge is named after her and a fellow revolutionary, Nguyễn Văn Trỗi.

Since 1956, Lý worked as a liaison officer for the People's Army of Vietnam in Điện Bàn but the same year, she was arrested on her commute to work by the South Vietnamese. After being tortured for 2 years and being left for dead by her captors, she was flown to the Vietnam – Soviet Friendship Hospital in Hanoi, weighing just 26 kilograms (57 lb), having 42 wounds across her body, with cut nipples and bleeding genitals.

In 1992 she was awarded the Hero of the People's Armed Forces medal and died shortly after. She left behind her adopted daughter Thùy Linh and her husband Tuấn.
