= Da Nang Port =

Coordinates: 16.0667°N 108.2333°E

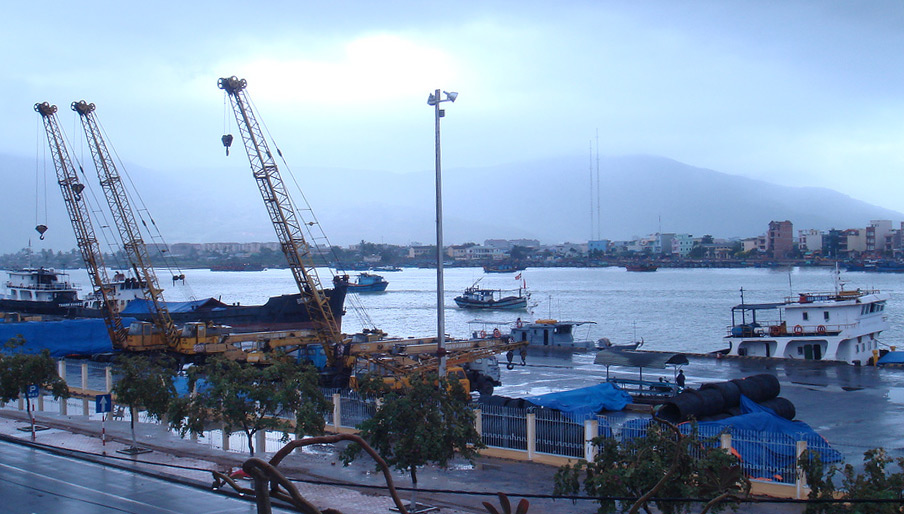
- Song Han Terminal.
- Interactive map of Da Nang Port
- Native name: Cảng Đà Nẵng

Location
- Country: Vietnam
- Location: Da Nang

Details
- Size: 299,256 m^{2} (3,221,160 ft^{2})

Đà Nẵng Port (Vietnamese: Cảng Đà Nẵng) is a major port system located in Central Vietnam at the mouth of the Han River on the South China Sea, in the city of Đà Nẵng. It is the third largest port system in Vietnam (after Saigon Port in Ho Chi Minh City and the port of Hải Phòng). Đà Nẵng Port lies at one end of the East–West Economic Corridor, an economic corridor connecting Vietnam with Laos, Thailand, and Burma. Vietnam National Shipping Lines (Vinalines) is the port's authority.

In 2008, Đà Nẵng Port handled 2.7 million tons of cargo, of which 1.2 million tons were exports, 525,900 tons were imports, and 985,600 tons were domestic cargo. Over 29,600 passengers passed through the port in 2008, a significant increase over previous years. Despite the fact that the port's infrastructure is not specifically designed to accommodate cruise ships, the number of large cruise ships docking at Đà Nẵng Port has increased in recent years. In the first two months of 2010 alone, 12 cruise ships docked in Đà Nẵng, carrying 6,477 passengers.

Kawasaki port is a friendship port since 1994.

== History ==
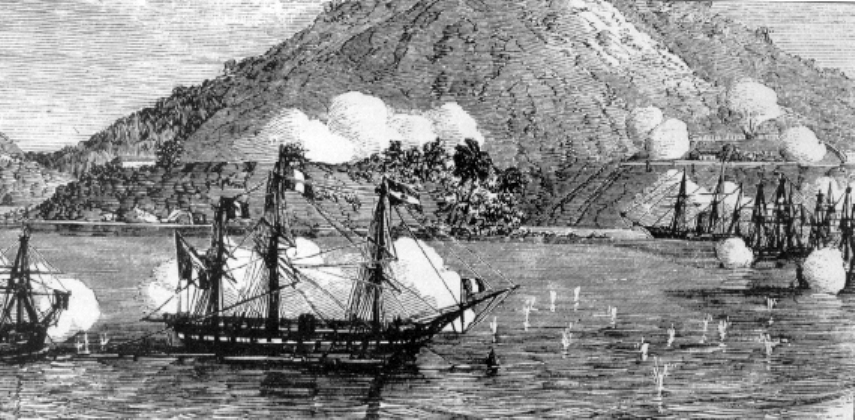
French ships attack Đà Nẵng Port in 1858.

Đà Nẵng has been a port city for many centuries, long before the first arrival of European traders in the 16th century. One of the first Europeans to visit the city was Portuguese explorer Antonio De Faria, who anchored at Đà Nẵng Port in 1535. De Faria was one of the first Westerners to write about the area, and through his influence Portuguese ships began to call regularly at Hội An, which was then a far more important port than Đà Nẵng.

Throughout the 17th and 18th centuries, French and Spanish traders and missionaries regularly made landfall at Hội An, just south of Đà Nẵng. In 1787, Emperor Gia Long concluded a treaty with King Louis XVI, whereby he ceded Đà Nẵng Port to the French in return for promised military aid.

Following the edict of Emperor Minh Mạng in 1835 prohibiting European vessels from making landfall or pursuing trade except at Đà Nẵng, its port quickly superseded Hội An as the largest commercial port in the central region.

In 1847, French vessels dispatched by Admiral Cécille bombarded Đà Nẵng, ostensibly on the grounds of persecution of Roman Catholic missionaries by Emperor Thiệu Trị. In August 1858, again ostensibly on grounds of alleged persecution of Catholic missionaries—this time by Emperor Tự Đức—French troops led by Admiral Charles Rigault de Genouilly seized Đà Nẵng Port as part of the punitive Cochinchina Campaign. The French overpowered the Vietnamese stationed in Đà Nẵng, swiftly occupying the city and Tiên Sa Peninsula (now called Sơn Trà Peninsula). Đà Nẵng (which the French called Tourane) and its port would remain in French hands until 1954, upon the formal dissolution of French Indochina in the 1950s.

In 1965, U.S. Army General William Westmoreland and James Killen, chief of U.S. foreign aid, agreed to expand Da Nang Port in order to supply materiel directly to U.S. troops in Vietnam. Da Nang, however, had shallow water and lacked cargo handling equipment. As such, Westmoreland recommended the U.S. prioritise developing Cam Ranh Bay instead. New piers were under construction at Da Nang in 1966. After SeaLand began operating container ship services to Vietnam in October 1966, three of its vessels covered routes between the West Coast of the United States and Da Nang.

== Facilities ==
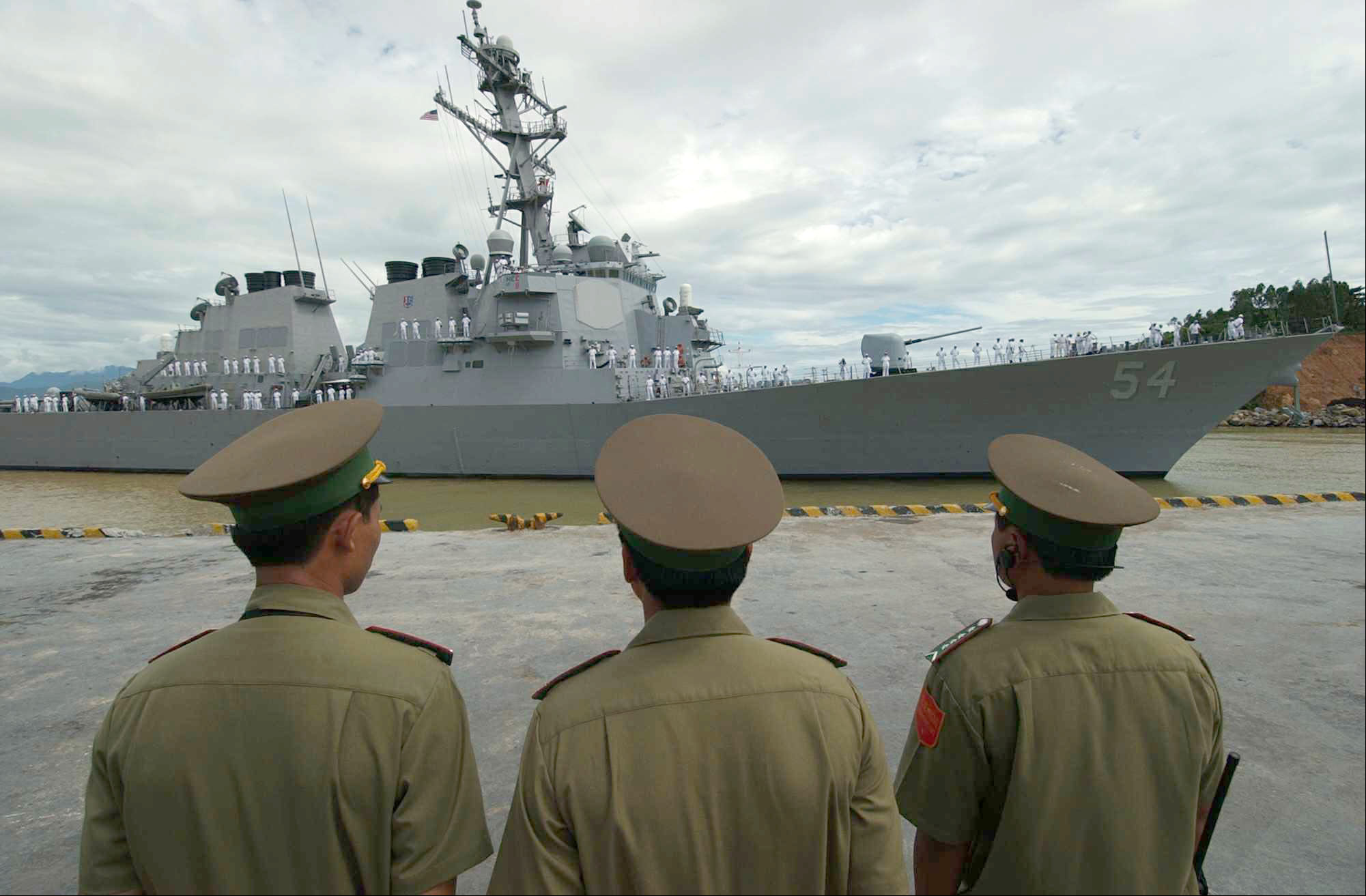
Vietnamese military officials watch as the USS Curtis Wilbur moors at Đà Nẵng Port.

Đà Nẵng Port consists of two main terminals (Tiên Sa Seaport and Song Hàn Terminal) and an additional freight warehouse, Tho Quang Station. The total area of the port system is 299,256 m^{2} (3,221,160 sq ft), of which 29,204 m^{2} (314,350 sq ft) is warehouse space and 183,722 m^{2} (1,977,570 sq ft) is yard space.

In recent years, the number of large cruise ships docking at Đà Nẵng Port has increased, despite the fact that its infrastructure is not specifically designed to accommodate cruise ships. Due to these limitations, cruise ships generally make short stays—about 2 or 3 days at most. In the first two months of 2010, 12 cruise ships were reported to have docked at Đà Nẵng Port, carrying 6,477 tourists, mainly from Europe, the U.S., Canada and Australia.

=== Tiên Sa Seaport ===
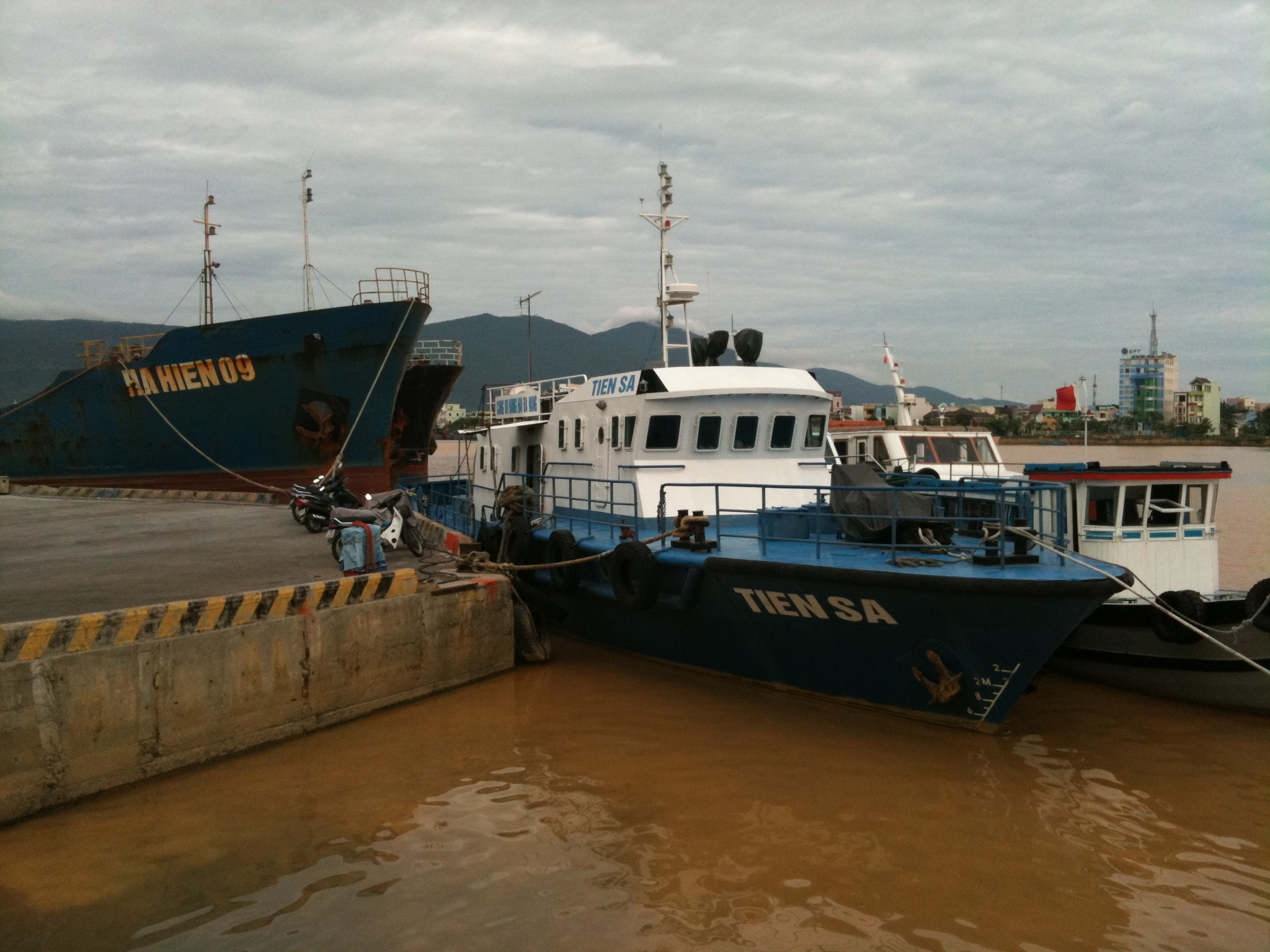
Boats docked at Song Hàn Terminal.

Tiên Sa Seaport has a navigation depth of 11 m (36 ft), and is able to receive medium range tankers of up to 45,000 DWT, as well as container ships of up to 2,000 TEUs and large cruise ships of up to 75,000 GRT. A 450 m (1,480 ft) breakwater provides protection from high waves and monsoons. The terminal has five berths in total: four berths, located along two finger piers of 185 m (607 ft) each, and one 225 m (738 ft) berth on a wharf along the shore, for a total of 965 m (3,166 ft) Throughput capacity at this terminal is over 4.5 million tons per year. Tiên Sa terminal contains 13,665 m^{2} (147,090 sq ft) of warehouse space and 138,251 m^{2} (1,488,120 sq ft) of yards.

=== Sông Hàn Terminal ===
The approach to Sông Hàn Terminal is 12 nautical miles (22 km) long with a navigation depth of 6-7m. The terminal has five berths, located along the shore; berth No. 1 is 140 m (460 ft) long, berths No. 2 and 3 are 100 m (330 ft) long, berth No. 4 is 90 m (300 ft) long, and berth No. 5 is 98 m (322 ft) long, for a total of 528 m (1,732 ft). Sông Hàn Terminal can accommodate vessels of up to 5,000 DWT. Throughput capacity is over 1 million tons per year. Sông Hàn Terminal contains 3,314 m^{2} (35,670 sq ft) of warehouse space and 16,330 m^{2} (175,800 sq ft) of yard space.

=== Tho Quang Station ===
Tho Quang freight warehouse station contains 12,225 m^{2} (131,590 sq ft) of warehouse space and 29,141 m^{2} (313,670 sq ft) of yard space.
