= Hàn River Bridge =

Bridge in Da Nang, Vietnam

Han River Bridge (Song Han Bridge) Cầu Sông Hàn
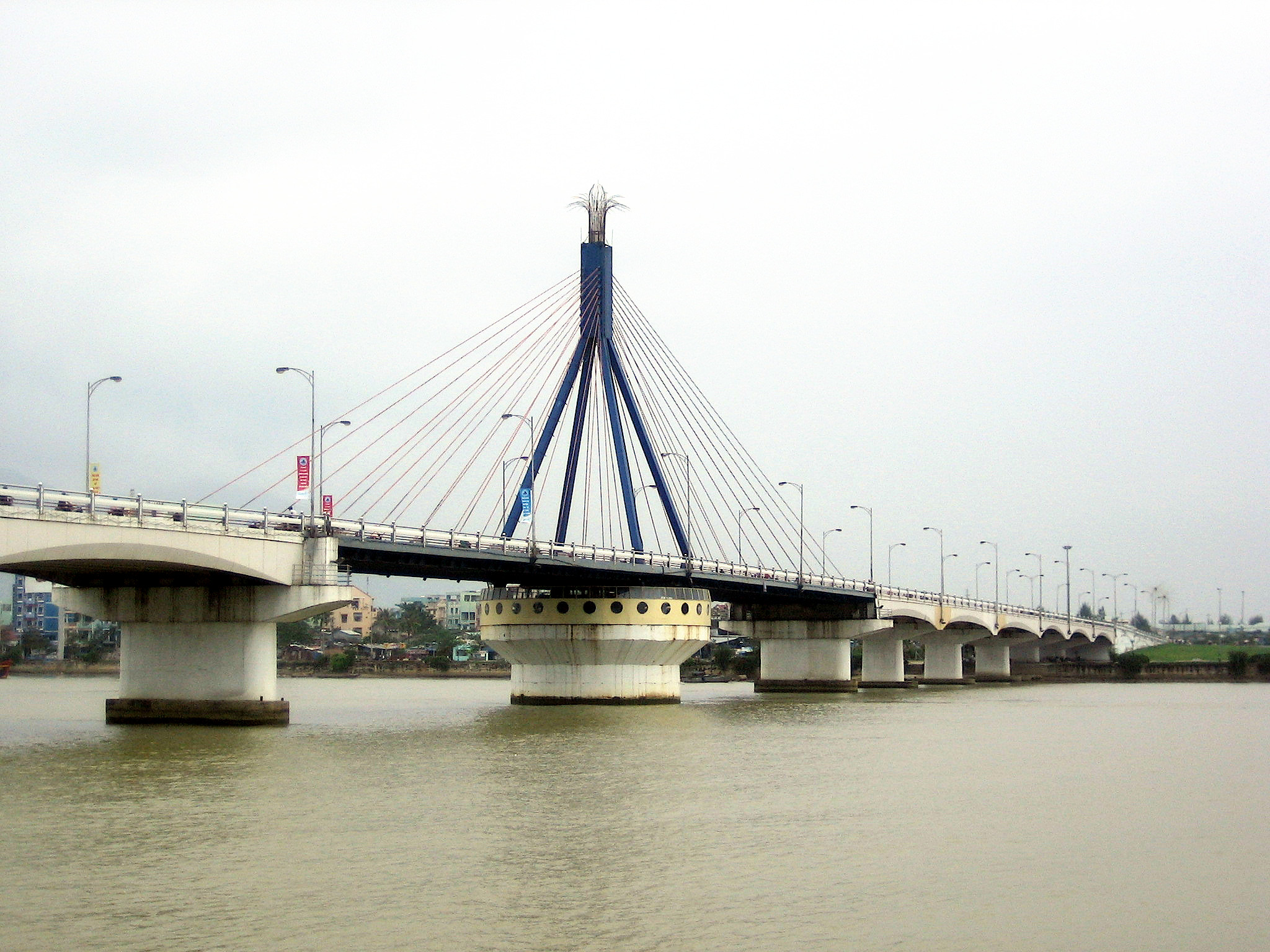
- Han River Bridge
- Coordinates: 16°4′20.2″N 108°13′36.2″E
- Carries: Two lanes for motor vehicles, two side lanes for pedestrians and cyclists
- Crosses: Han River
- Locale: Da Nang, Vietnam
- Official name: Cầu Sông Hàn

Characteristics
- Design: Cable-stayed bridge, Swing bridge
- Material: Concrete, steel
- Total length: 487.7 meters (1,600 ft)
- Width: 12.9 meters (42 ft)
- Longest span: 122.7 meters (403 ft) swing span
- No. of spans: 12
- Piers in water: 1 circular central pier for swing span, plus 11 piers for the 11 fixed side spans
- Clearance below: 25 meters (82 ft) with swing span closed

History
- Construction start: 1998
- Opened: 2000

Location
- Interactive map of Han River Bridge (Song Han Bridge)

Hàn River bridge (Song Han Bridge, Vietnamese: Cầu Sông Hàn; occasionally known as Da Nang Opening Bridge) is a cable-stayed swing bridge in downtown Da Nang, Vietnam. Prior to the construction of the bridge, Da Nang was developed mainly on the west side (left bank) of the Hàn River, and traditional fishing villages and beaches were to the east. Decades after the opening of the bridge, Danang city has developed on both sides of the Han River. The bridge is the first Vietnamese-engineered and Vietnamese-built bridge in the city, the only swing bridge operating in Vietnam, and the first of several 21st-century bridges crossing Danang's Han River and facilitating economic development on both banks.

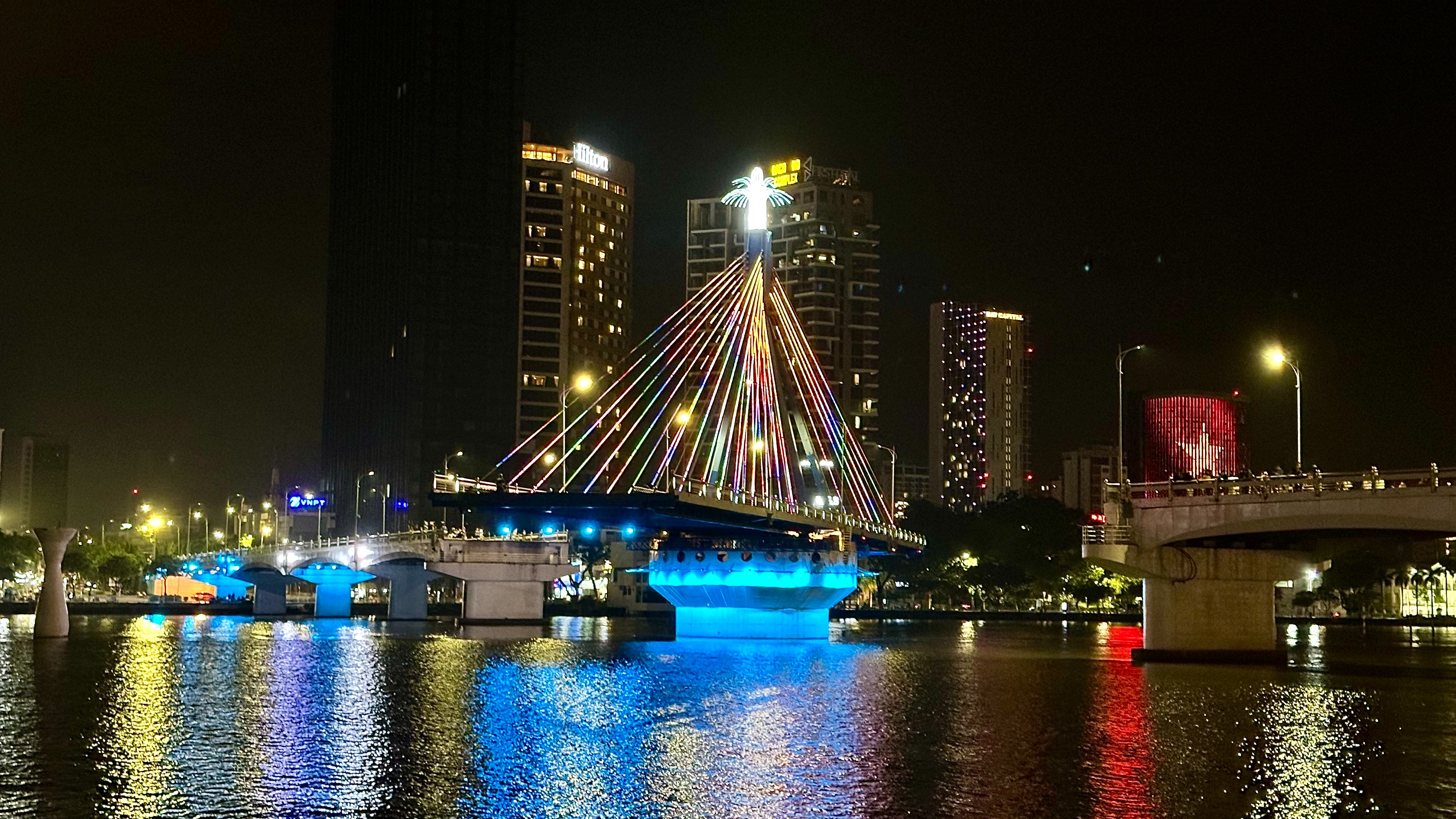
Han River Bridge in the open position

The bridge is lit up brightly at night. After midnight, traffic is stopped from crossing the Song Han Bridge as it swings on its axis to allow shipping traffic to pass along the river. On weekends, the bridge swings open at 11 pm; traffic is stopped at 10:45pm; the rotation process takes about 15 minutes to swing the bridge open.

== History ==
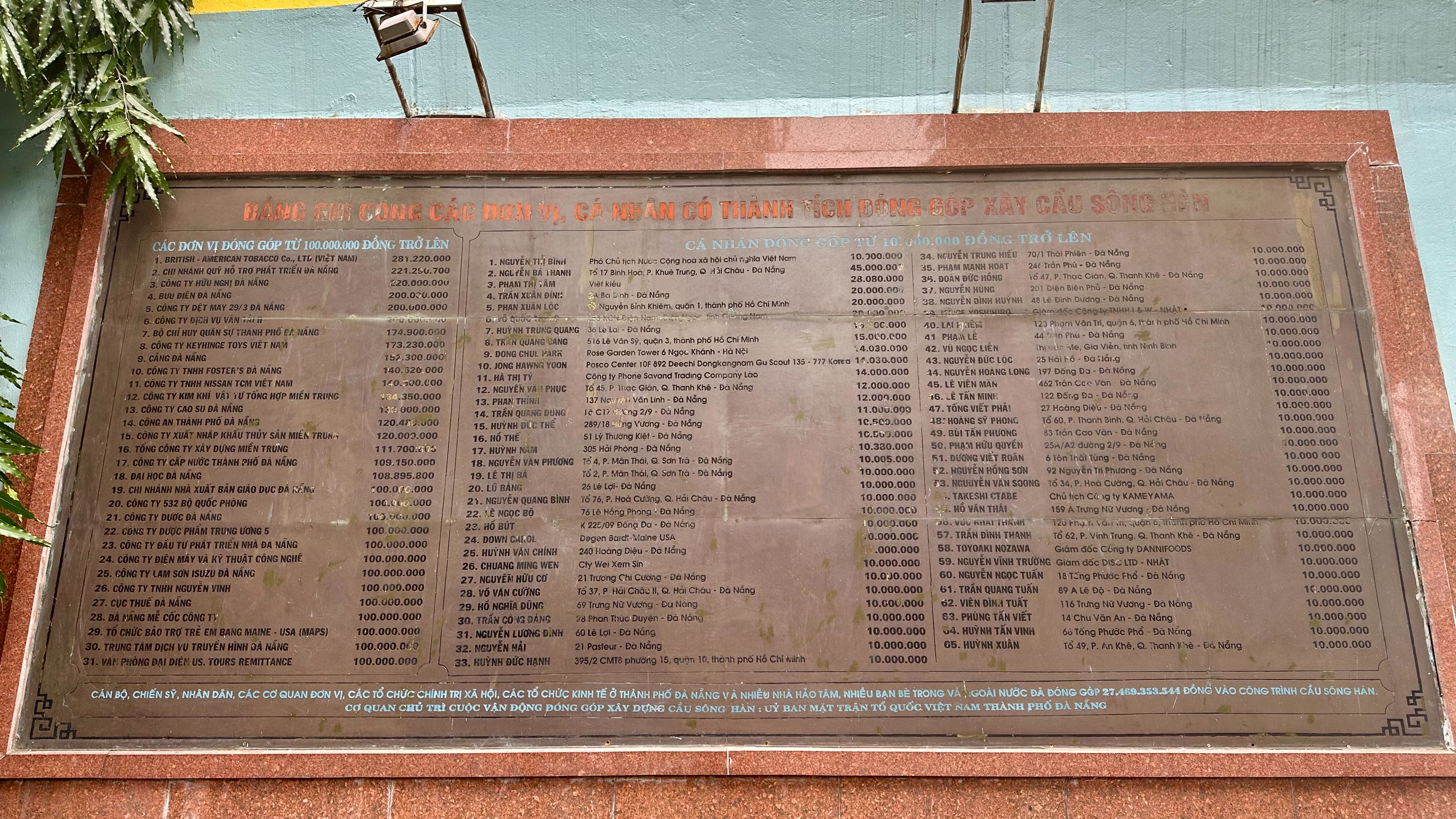
Plaque listing donors to the Han River Bridge

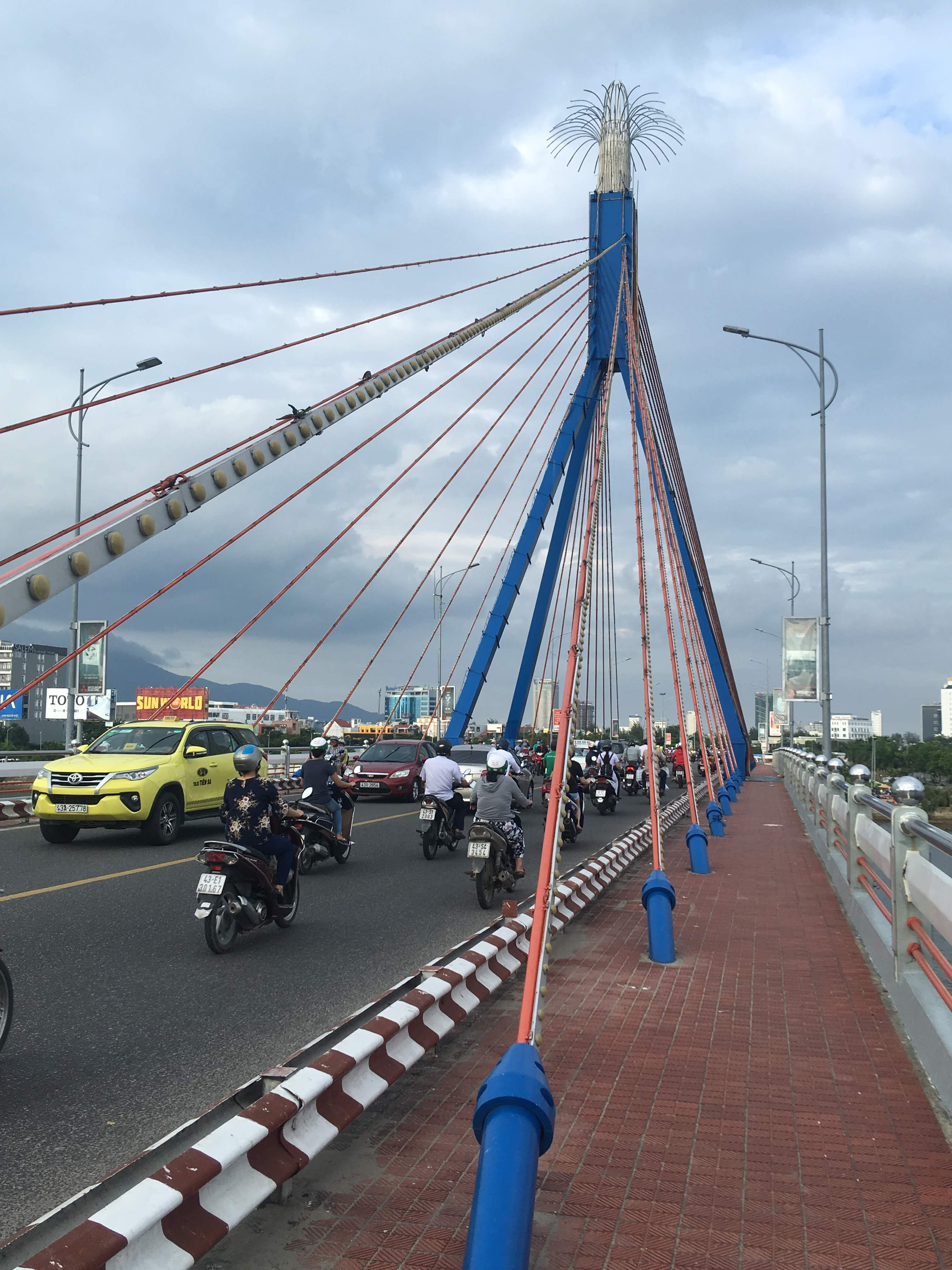
The cable-stayed swing span, Han River Bridge

In 1997, when the greater Da Nang city was separated from Quang Nam province and became a centrally controlled municipality, there was only one bridge that crossed the Han River connecting the urban west side with the villages and beaches on the east side. The decision was made to construct a new bridge linking the downtown thoroughfare Le Duan Street with Pham Van Dong Street on the eastern portion. The Song Han Bridge was designed by Vietnamese engineers and financed in part by Vietnamese companies and donors from Da Nang, with a total of 27,409,353,544 VND donated, according to a plaque on the western ramp. The bridge was opened with a grand ceremony on 29 March 2000, to the delight of the people of Da Nang. It marked the beginning of economic development on both banks of the Han River. It symoblizes the city's rise and appears prominently on the city's logo.

Han River Swing Bridge in Da Nang logo

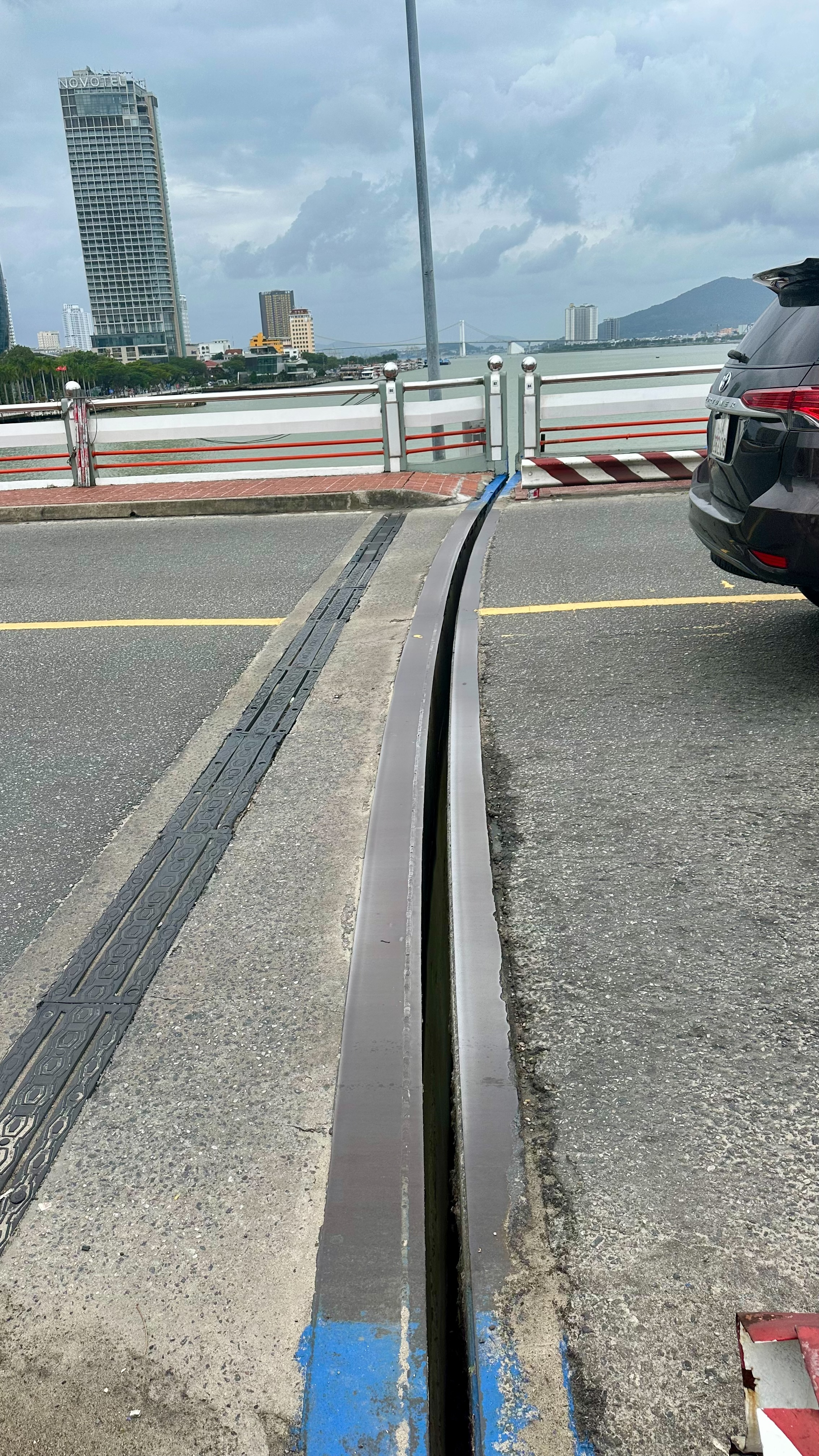
Roadway transition to the rotating swing span, Han River Bridge

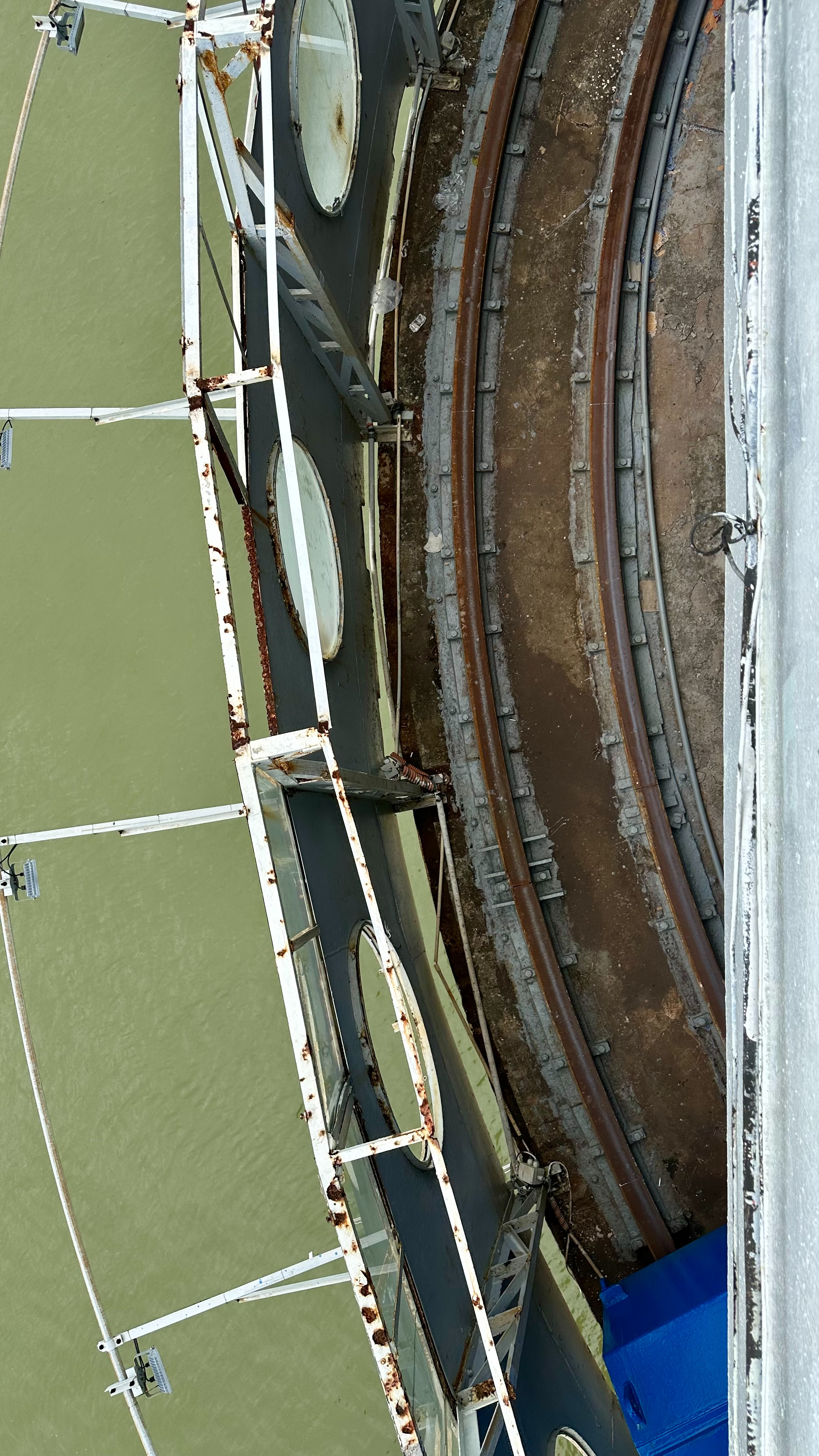
Rotating mechanism in the central pier of the swing span, Han River Bridge

The Han River Bridge is the only swing bridge operating in Vietnam. Its symmetrical cable-stayed swing span has a total length of 122.7 meters (403 ft) and rotates on the rim-bearing circular turntable central pier. The swing span girder and tower structure is made of steel, the 11 fixed side spans are prestressed reinforced concrete, and the bridge deck is reinforced concrete. The bridge remains an important part of Danang's cityscape and economic development.

== Bribery and Corruption case ==
Shortly after the bridge was completed, the contractor, Phạm Minh Thông, was arrested. He was charged and jailed for stealing money from the project and for bribery, but the men who took the bribes were never revealed.

According to Radio Free Asia, the People's Procuracy of Da Nang City concluded in the Document No. 73/KSDT-KT (October, 2000) and Document No. 77/KSDT/KT (November 2000) sent to the Supreme People's Procuracy of Vietnam and Phan Diễn (then-Secretary of Communist Party Committee of Danang) that Nguyễn Bá Thanh received bribes from Phạm Minh Thông (4.4 billion VND in total) in the construction projects of Hàn River Bridge and North-South Street in Danang. However, the case was eventually dropped. Vietnamese mass media (which, according to Human Rights Watch and Reporters Without Borders, are all strictly controlled by the government) were censored and even praised Thanh for his "many contributions" in the development of Da Nang City.

== See also ==
- Nguyễn Văn Trỗi Bridge (1965)
- Thuận Phước Bridge (2010)
- Dragon River Bridge (2013)
- Tran Thi Ly Bridge (2013)
