= Nguyễn Văn Trỗi =

Vietnamese revolutionary executed in 1964

- Nguyễn Văn Trỗi moments before his execution
- Born: 1 February 1940; Điện Bàn, Quảng Nam, Annam, French Indochina
- Died: 15 October 1964 (aged 24); Chi Hoa Prison, Saigon, South Vietnam
- Status: Executed by firing squad
- Conviction: Attempted murder
- Penalty: Capital punishment

Nguyễn Văn Trỗi (1 February 1940 – 15 October 1964) was a Vietnamese electrician and member of the National Liberation Front of South Vietnam who was convicted by the Republic of Vietnam of attempting to assassinate United States Secretary of Defense Robert McNamara during McNamara's 1964 visit to South Vietnam. South Vietnamese authorities arrested Trỗi after uncovering a plot to bomb the Công Lý Bridge in Saigon, over which McNamara's motorcade was expected to pass.

Trỗi was executed by firing squad in Saigon on 15 October 1964. Following his death, the Democratic Republic of Vietnam and the National Liberation Front promoted him as a revolutionary martyr, issuing commemorative stamps, monuments, and propaganda materials bearing his image.

== Attempted assassination plot ==
The plot for which Trỗi was arrested involved placing explosives on or near the Công Lý Bridge in Saigon, where McNamara's motorcade was expected to pass during a visit to South Vietnam. The bridge lay on the route from Tan Son Nhut Air Base toward central Saigon.

Contemporary and later Western accounts generally associate the plot with McNamara's May 1964 visit to South Vietnam. The United States Department of State's published Foreign Relations of the United States volume documents McNamara-related meetings in Saigon in May 1964 as part of the second McNamara–Taylor mission.

== Trial, reprieve, and execution ==
Trỗi was sentenced to death by South Vietnamese authorities. In October 1964, his case became linked to an international hostage crisis after Venezuelan guerrillas of the Armed Forces of National Liberation kidnapped United States Air Force Lieutenant Colonel Michael Smolen and threatened to kill him unless Trỗi's sentence was commuted.

Smolen was released unharmed. Trỗi was executed by firing squad at Chi Hoa Prison in Saigon on 15 October 1964.

== Posthumous image and legacy ==
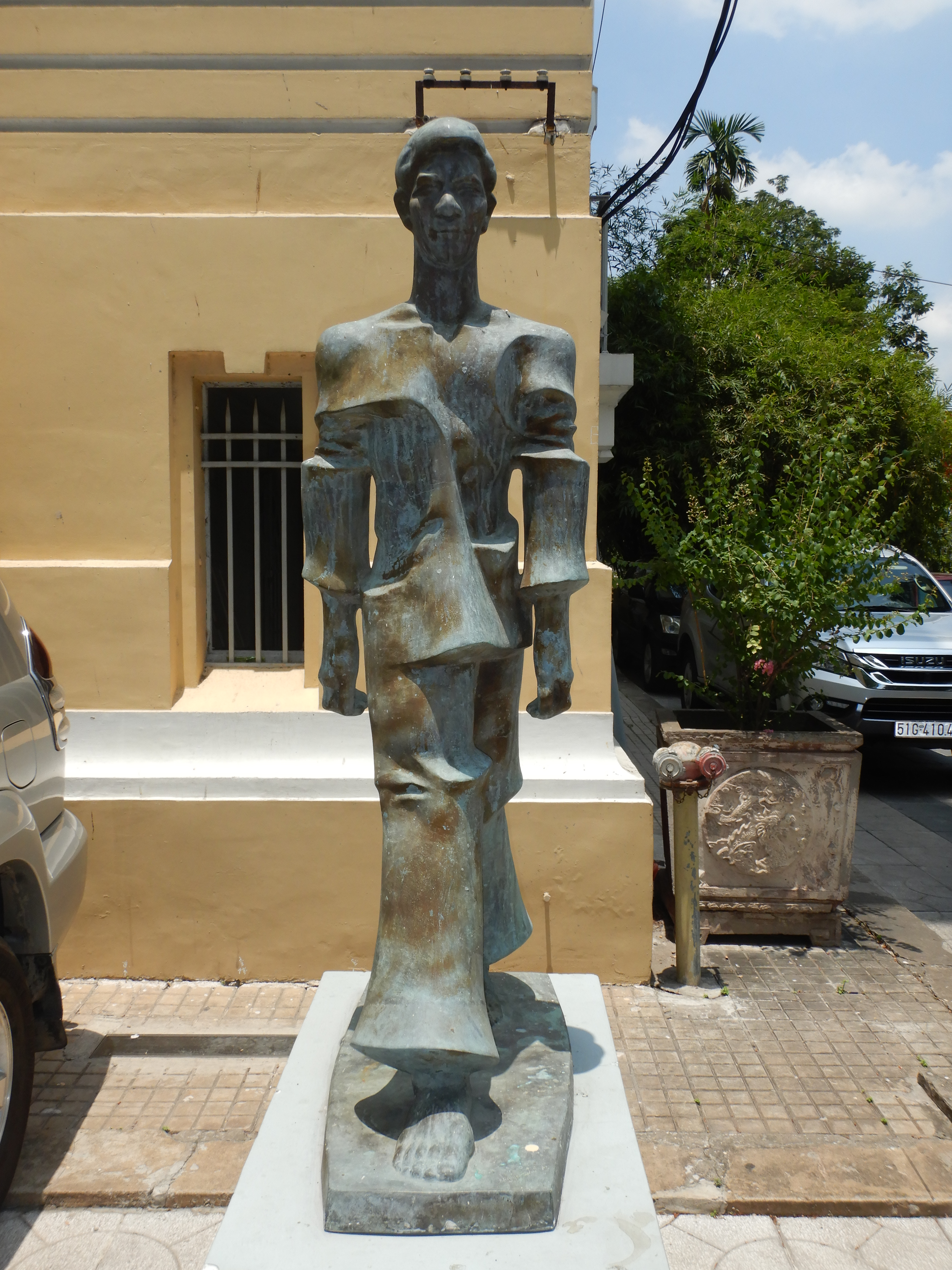
1994 bronze statue Nguyễn Văn Trỗi by Vietnamese sculptor Nguyễn Hải

NLF stamp depicting the execution of Nguyễn Văn Trỗi, produced by the National Liberation Front of South Vietnam. (15 October 1965).

After his execution, the Democratic Republic of Vietnam and the National Liberation Front used Trỗi's image in stamps and other commemorative materials. His name was later given to streets, schools, bridges, and public sites throughout Vietnam and in several foreign countries.

In Ho Chi Minh City, Nguyễn Văn Trỗi Street follows part of the route associated with the attempted attack on McNamara's motorcade, and a memorial to Trỗi stands near the former Công Lý Bridge.

In Đà Nẵng, the Nguyễn Văn Trỗi Bridge spans the Hàn River.

== Book by Phan Thị Quyên ==
Trỗi's widow, Phan Thị Quyên, later published a short biography of him through the Foreign Languages Publishing House in Hanoi. As a publication issued by North Vietnam shortly after his execution, the work is useful for understanding his official revolutionary image, though historians generally treat specific biographical claims with caution when they cannot be independently verified.
