= Tiên Sơn Bridge =

Bridge in Da Nang, Vietnam

Coordinates: 16°01′55″N 108°14′06″E

Tiên Sơn Bridge (Vietnamese: cầu Tiên Sơn) is a bridge completed in 2004 spanning the Han River in the city of Da Nang, Vietnam. It is a prestressed concrete box girder bridge 529 m long, connecting the Tien Sa Port to the National Road 14B across Southeast Asia.
