= Thuận Phước Bridge =

Thuận Phước Bridge Cầu Thuận Phước
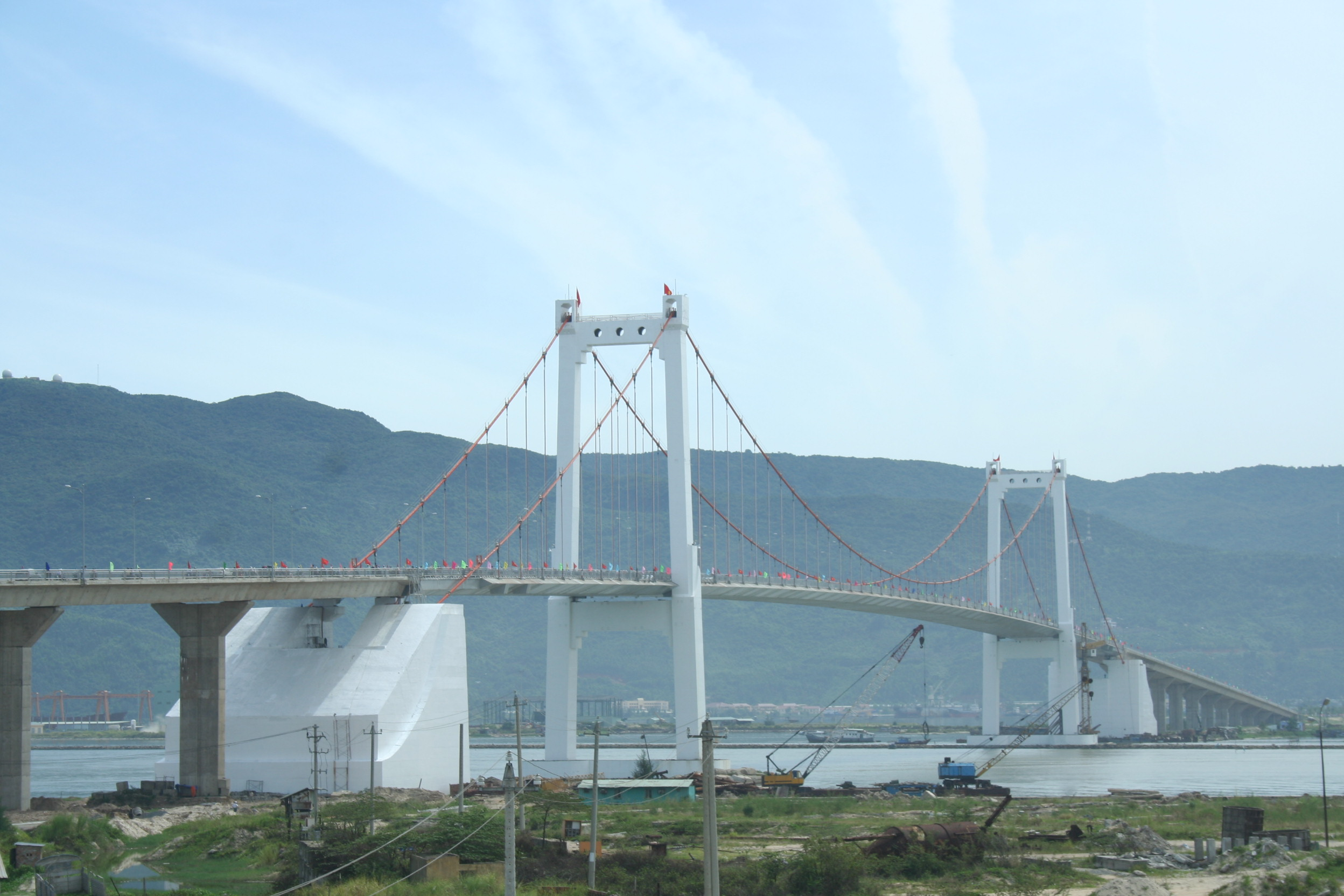
- Coordinates: 16°05′31″N 108°13′19″E
- Carries: Motor vehicles, pedestrians and cyclists
- Crosses: Han River
- Locale: Da Nang, Vietnam

Characteristics
- Design: Suspension bridge
- Material: Concrete
- Total length: 1,850 metres (6,070 ft)
- Width: 18 metres (59 ft)
- Height: 80 metres (260 ft)
- Longest span: 405 metres (1,329 ft)
- Piers in water: 2

History
- Construction start: 2003
- Opened: 19 July 2009

The Thuận Phước Bridge (Vietnamese: Cầu Thuận Phước) is a suspension bridge that spans the mouth of the Han River in the port city Da Nang, Vietnam.

The four-lane, three-span, bridge is 1,850 meters long and 18 meters wide, and has a main span of 405 meters. Its two main towers are 80m in height. It is the longest suspension bridge in Vietnam, with total investment of nearly 1 trillion dong. The bridge was built with an estimated cost of VND 650 billion (about 42 million US dollars). Consulting firms from China, Cuba and Canada provided assistance.

The construction of the bridge, which began in 2003, was completed on 19 July 2009 when the Prime Minister of Vietnam Nguyen Tan Dung and many high-ranking government officials attended the inauguration ceremony.

== See also ==
- Han River Bridge
- Dragon River Bridge
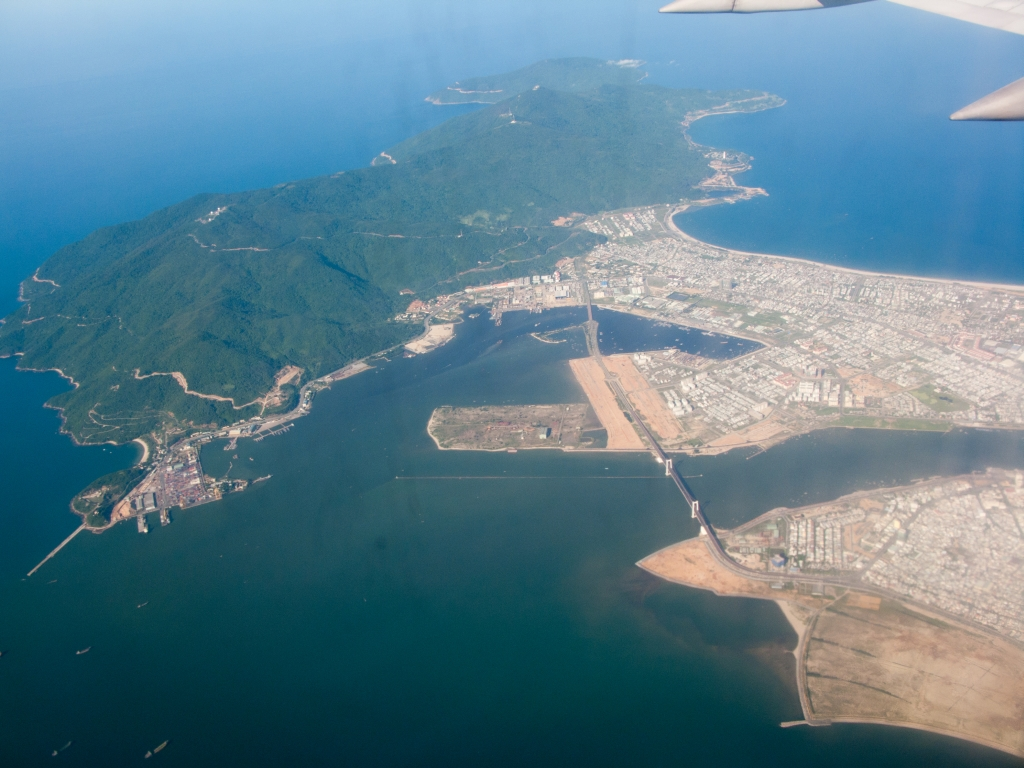

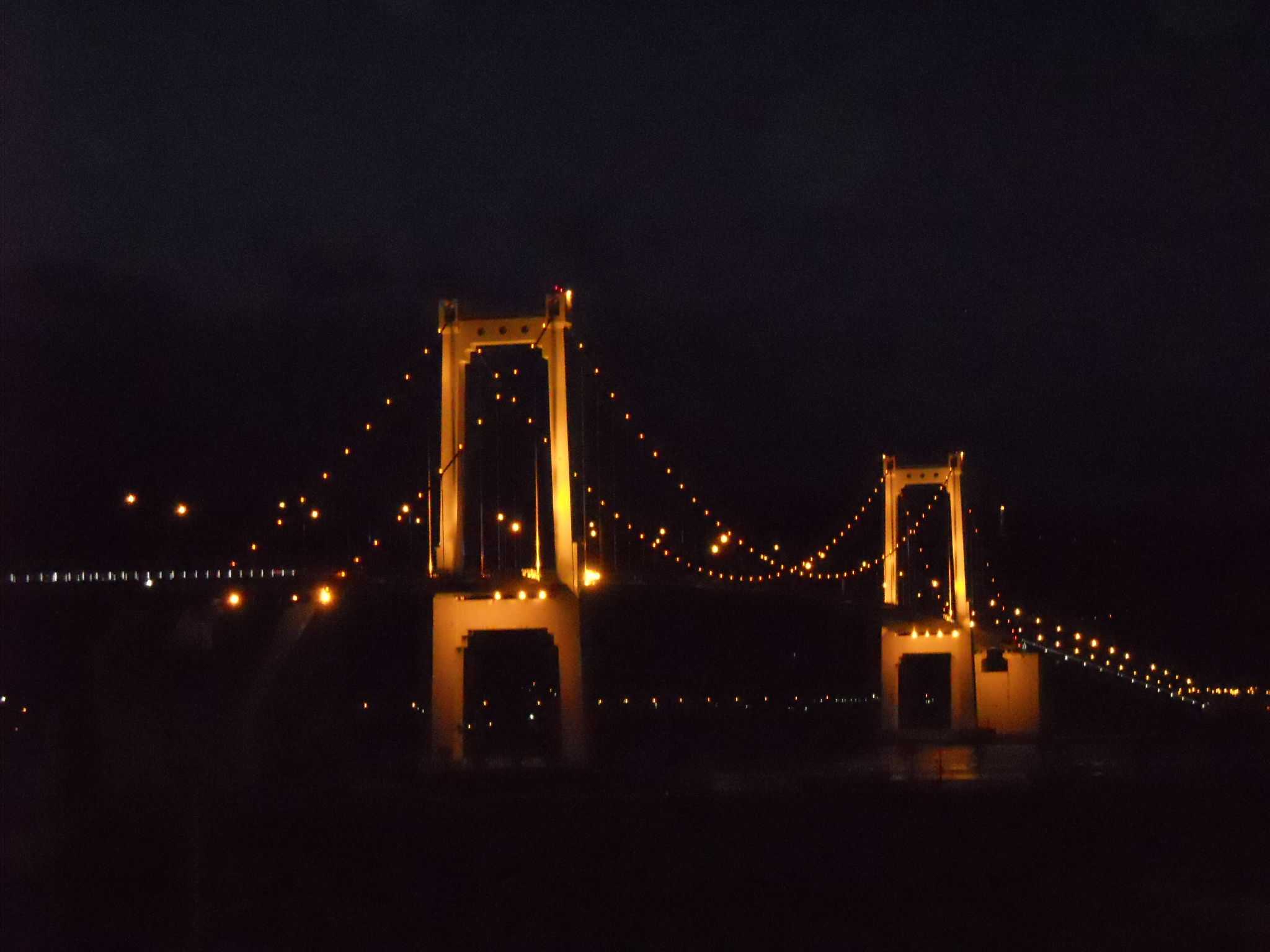

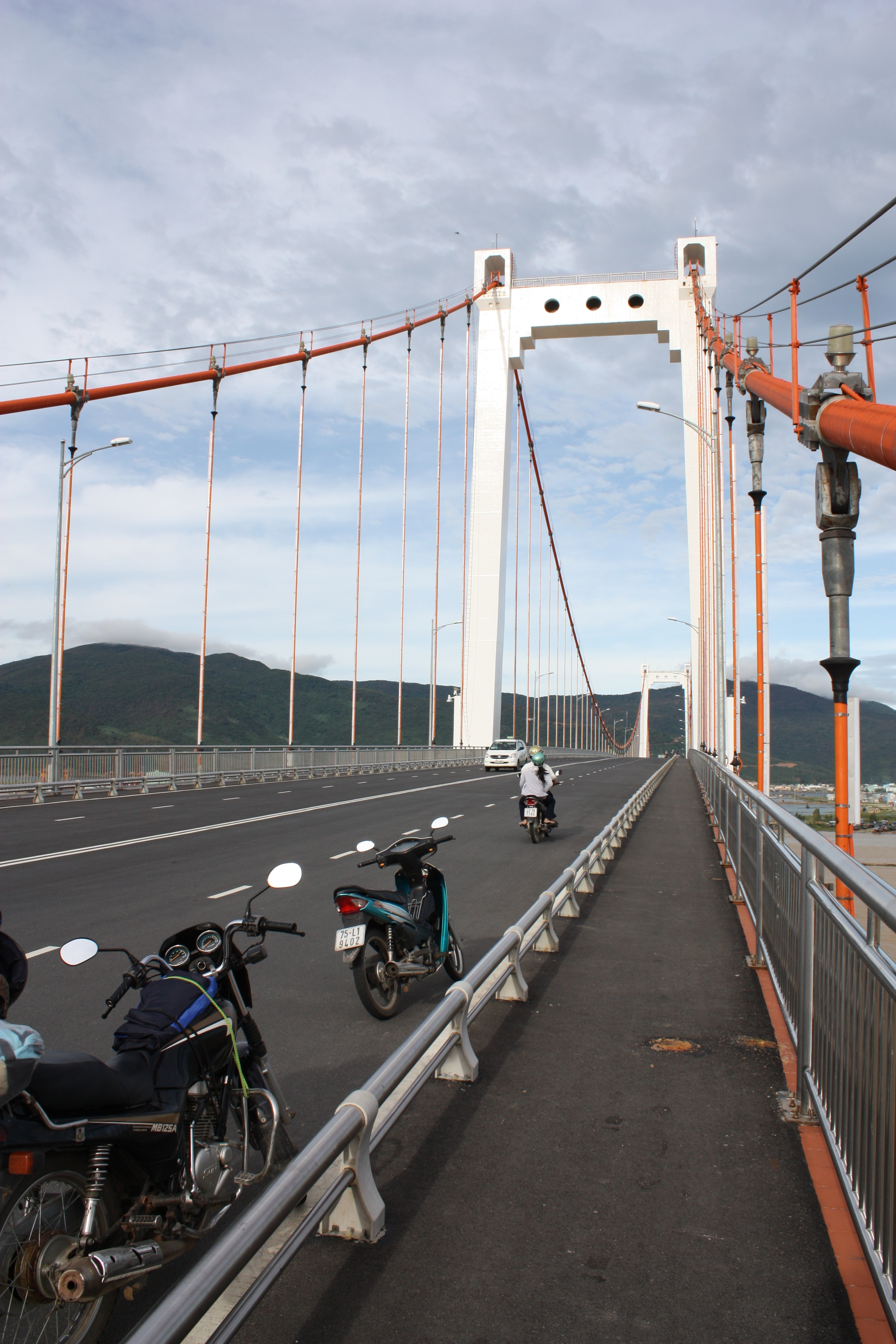

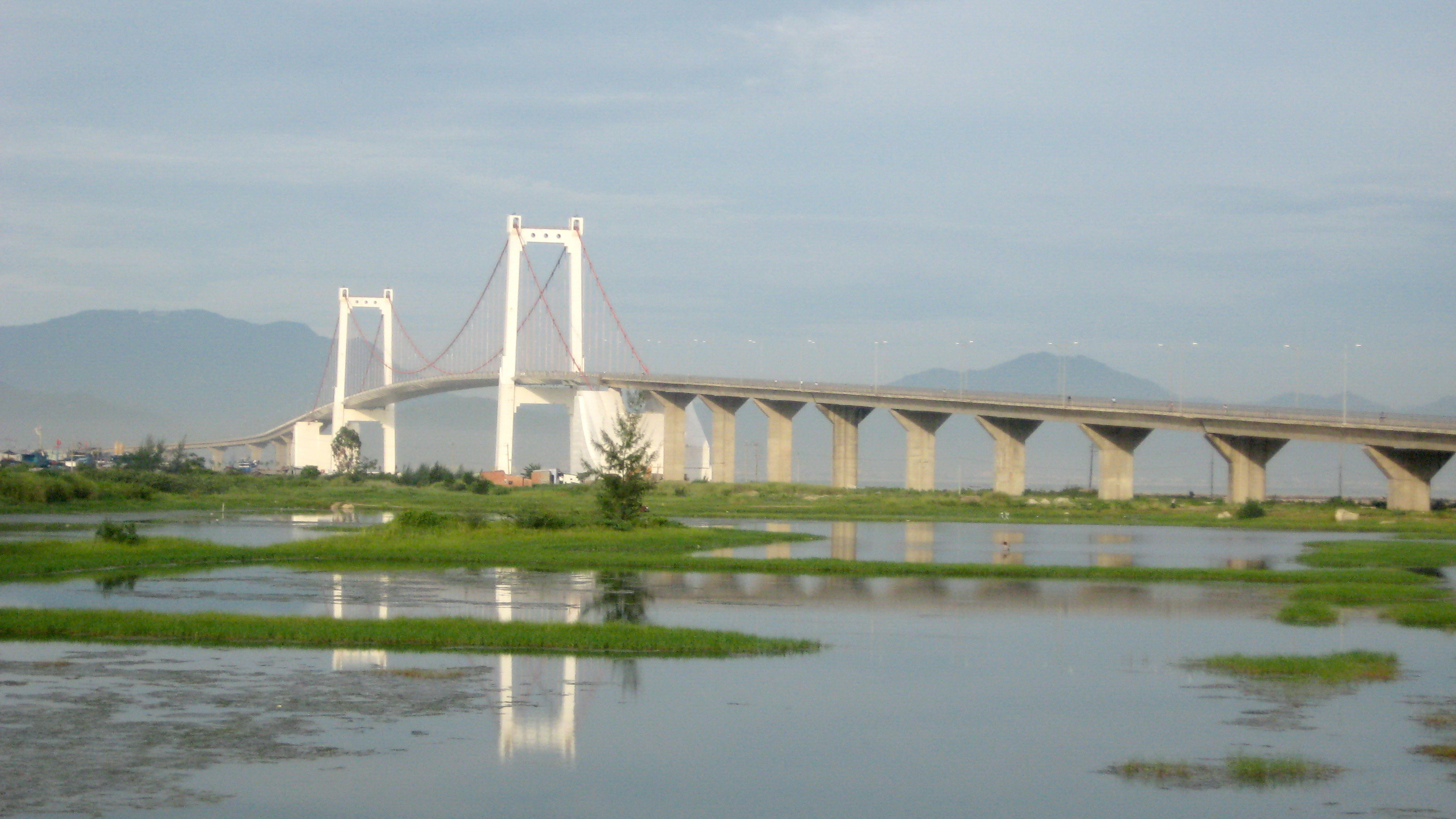
