= Siege of Tourane =

1858 siege at the start of the French conquest of Vietnam

Coordinates: 16.0666°N 108.2333°E

- Part of the Cochinchina Campaign
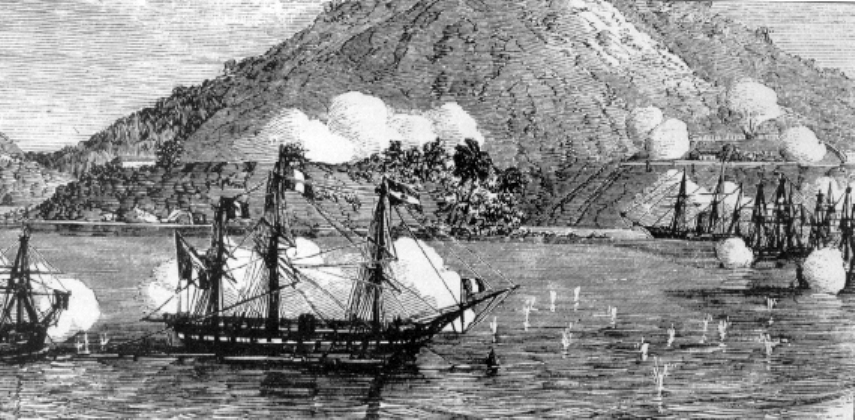
- French warships off Tourane, September 1858
Date	1 September 1858 – 22 March 1860
Location	Quảng Nam, Trung Kỳ, Đại Nam
Result	Vietnamese victory

Belligerents
(Second French Empire) French Empire; (Spain) Spanish Empire; (Spain) Captaincy General of the Philippines	Đại Nam

Commanders and leaders
(Second French Empire) Rigault de Genouilly (Second French Empire) François Page	Nguyễn Tri Phương; Lê Đình Lý; Đào Trí

Strength
1 50-gun frigate 2 12-gun corvettes 5 steam-gunboats 5 steam transports 1 despatch vessel 1,000 French marine infantry 550 Spanish infantry 450 Filipino chasseurs Tagals	2,000 men, rising to 10,000 men

Casualties and losses
128 killed or wounded ~300 deaths from cholera	1,000+ killed

The siege of Tourane (September 1858–March 1860) was a Vietnamese victory during the Cochinchina campaign, a punitive campaign against the Vietnamese launched by France and Spain in 1858. A joint Franco-Spanish expedition under the command of Admiral Charles Rigault de Genouilly captured Tourane (modern Da Nang) in September 1858, but was then besieged in the city by the Vietnamese and forced eventually to evacuate it in March 1860.

== Background ==
In 1857, the Vietnamese emperor Tự Đức executed two Spanish Catholic missionaries. This was neither the first nor the last such incident. On this occasion, France and Britain had just dispatched a joint military expedition to the Qing Empire as part of the Second Opium War, and the French had troops to hand with which to intervene in Vietnam. In November 1857, the French emperor Napoleon III authorized Admiral Charles Rigault de Genouilly to launch a punitive expedition. In the following September, a joint French and Spanish expedition landed at Tourane, whose fine, sheltered harbor would make it a good base of operations for a campaign against Annam.

== Forces engaged ==
Rigault de Genouilly's flagship was the screw-powered 50-gun frigate Némésis. He was accompanied by the screw-powered 12-gun corvettes Primauguet and Phlégéton, the steam-gunboats Alarme, Avalanche, Dragonne, Fusée and Mitraille, and the steam transports Durance, Saône, Gironde, Dordogne and Meurthe. The Spanish navy was represented by the armed despatch vessel El Caño. (Note: The flotilla may also have included the corvette Laplace and the aviso Régent (or Prégent), mentioned in Thomazi's Histoire militaire (1931) but not in Gundry's China and Her Neighbours (1893) nor in Thomazi's Conquête (1934).) The transports carried a landing force of two overstrength battalions of French marine infantry (1,000 men), a marine artillery battery and 1,000 troops drawn from the Spanish garrison of the Philippines (550 Spanish troops and 450 Filipino light infantry, mostly Tagalogs and Visayans, known to the French as chasseurs Tagals).

Tourane lay on the southern shore of the Bay of Tourane. Its main defenses were sited on the Tien Cha peninsula, on the eastern side of the bay. The Vietnamese had built five major forts along the sheltered western side of the peninsula, covering the approaches to the town (see map). These forts were known respectively to the French as Fort de l'Aiguade, Fort de l'Observatoire (Observatory Fort), Fort du Nord (Northern Fort), Fort de l'Est (Eastern Fort) and Fort de l'Ouest (Western Fort). Several shore batteries were deployed between these forts.

These were potentially formidable defenses:

The bay was defended by several forts. Some of these dated from the period of Pigneau de Béhaine and Olivier de Puymanel, but they were all in good condition, 'very superior', said the admiral, after visiting them, 'to anything we saw in China'. The cannons, of large and medium caliber, were mounted upon modern gun-carriages, the powder came from Britain, and the infantry was armed with good rifles, made in Belgium or France. Their arms, in the hands of trained soldiers, would be capable of sinking the entire naval division, and we were expecting the defenders at the very least to put up a serious resistance to it.

Tourane was defended by a Vietnamese garrison forces of 2,000 provincial soldiers (Vietnamese: biền binh) under the command of Chưởng cơ Đào Trí and Nam-Ngãi governor Trần Hoằng, then was reinforced with 2,000 center soldiers (Vietnamese: cấm binh) from Huế under the command of Đô thống Lê Đình Lý.

== Capture of Tourane and the Tiên Sa Peninsula ==
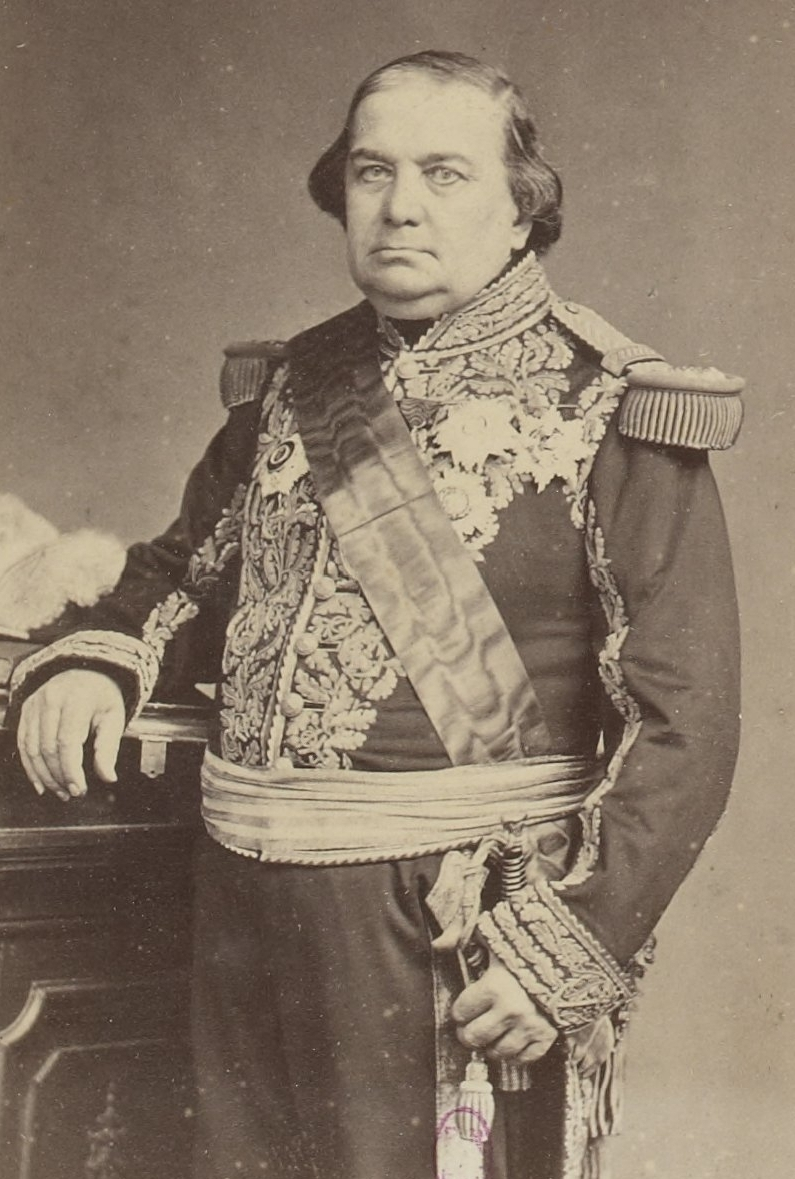
Admiral Charles Rigault de Genouilly (1807–73)

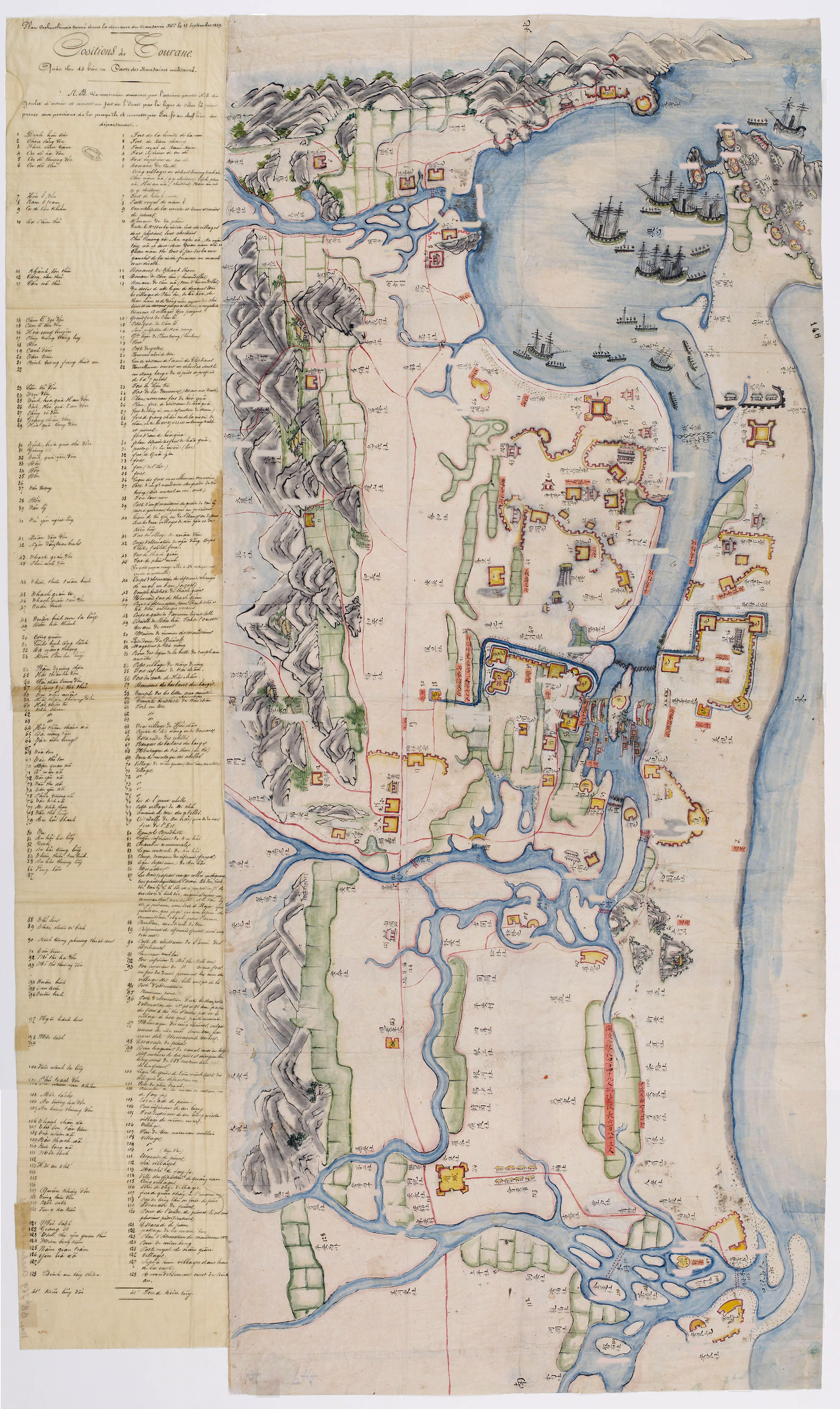
Map of Tourane (Da Nang) found in the home of a mandarin of the Vietnamese military in 1859. The map itself is at right, with annotations in Sino-Vietnamese script; a legend is at left, written in French.

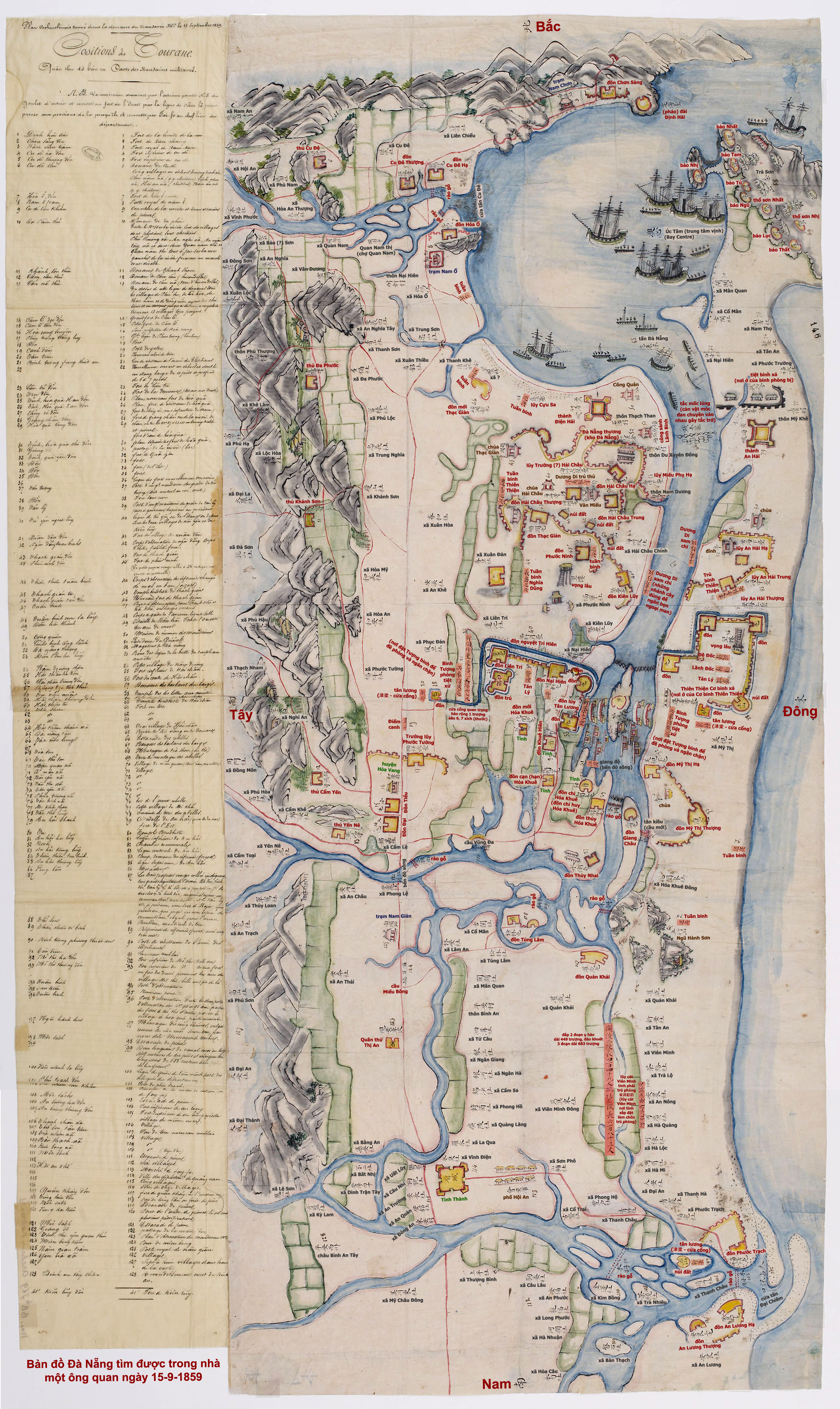
The translated Vietnamese version of the above Tourane 1859 map.

The allied expedition arrived off the entrance to Tourane Bay at nightfall on 31 August. At dawn on 1 September the warships took up positions facing the five Vietnamese forts on the Tiên Sa Peninsula.

During the morning of 1 September Admiral Rigault de Genouilly summoned the Vietnamese to hand over the forts within two hours. The summons was taken ashore by a French staff officer and laid at the entrance to the Fort de l'Aiguade. No response was received within the stipulated period, and the French admiral ordered the allied flotilla to open fire, hoisting a French flag at the main mast of Némésis and a Spanish flag at the mizzen mast.

The warships of the allied flotilla soon dismounted the guns in the northern group of Vietnamese forts. The Vietnamese response was feeble, and none of the allied ships suffered any damage. Rigault de Genouilly then put ashore the landing companies of Némésis, Primauguet and Phlégéton, under the orders of capitaine de vaisseau Reynaud. The sailors captured their first objective, the Fort de l'Aiguade, with little trouble, charging into the Vietnamese positions with cries of 'Vive l'Empereur!' Rigault de Genouilly's summons was found on a table inside the fort, unopened. The attackers also overran a Vietnamese shore battery a little to the west of the fort. While this attack was being made, French soldiers went ashore in their turn.

The southern objectives, Eastern Fort and Western Fort, were also taken without difficulty. Two French gunboats and the Spanish dispatch vessel El Caño anchored off the entrance to the Da Nang river and bombarded Western Fort and Eastern Fort. A shell burst inside Eastern Fort as the attackers approached and the survivors of the Vietnamese garrison abandoned their positions forthwith, as did the defenders of Western Fort.

Most of the Vietnamese made their escape from the Tiên Sa Peninsula, but the defenders of Observatory Fort were unable to evacuate their positions in time. The French stormed the fort, and its defenders were either killed where they stood or taken prisoner.

The allies followed up their victory by occupying Tourane and the Tiên Sa Peninsula.

Admiral Rigault de Genouilly left Da Nang with the bulk of his forces on 2 February 1859, to launch an attack on Saigon. The French left only a small garrison of soldiers and sailors at Tourane, under the command of capitaine de vaisseau Thoyon, and two gunboats. Meanwhile, the Tourane peninsula had been placed under siege by a Vietnamese army under the command of Nguyen Tri Phuong. The siege lasted for several months, though there was relatively little fighting. The Vietnamese adopted a scorched earth policy, laying waste the countryside around Tourane in the hope of starving the French and Spanish out.

In April 1859, in the wake of his Siege of Saigon on 17 February, Rigault de Genouilly returned to Tourane with the bulk of his forces to reinforce Thoyon's hard-pressed garrison. The French made two attacks on the Vietnamese positions later in the year. On 8 May, Rigault de Genouilly personally led 1,500 French soldiers and sailors in a successful assault on the Vietnamese trenches. A number of Vietnamese earthworks were destroyed and several cannon were captured and brought back to the French lines. French casualties were 78 men killed and wounded.

=== Engagement at Cẩm Lệ, 15 September 1859 ===
A second, equally successful, assault was made on 15 September on the Vietnamese positions at Cẩm Lệ. The Vietnamese had fortified a defense line one and a half kilometers long, consisting of strongpoints linked by trenches. Ditches filled with water had been dug in front of the trenches, and the defenses were crowned with bamboo stakes filed to sharp points. The allied garrison of Tourane had recently been reinforced by eight companies of marine infantry, and Rigault de Genouilly was able muster three columns for the attack, under the respective commands of Lieutenant Colonel Reybaud, Colonel Lanzarote and capitaine de vaisseau Reynaud, backed by a strong reserve under the command of chef de bataillon Breschin. (Note: Reybaud's column consisted of four companies of the 2nd Marine Infantry Regiment, three companies of the 3rd Marine Infantry Regiment and artillery and engineering detachments. Lanzarote's column contained Spanish troops. Reynaud's column consisted of the ships' landing companies, one company of marine infantry and artillery and engineering detachments. Breschin's reserve consisted of three marine infantry companies and some artillery.) The French and Spanish stormed the Vietnamese lines and put their defenders to flight. French casualties at Cẩm Lệ were 10 men killed and 40 wounded. Several hundred Vietnamese were killed and wounded, and the French and Spanish also captured 40 enemy cannon. The Vietnamese commander Lê Đình Lý was mortally wounded in the engagement.

Despite these impressive tactical victories, the French were unable to break the siege of Tourane. Meanwhile, disease was taking a heavy toll of the allied expedition. Cholera broke out both among the allied landing force and on the warships. Between 1 June and 20 June 1859, 200 French troops died from cholera in Tourane, and one battalion that joined the garrison at the end of April 1859 lost a third of its strength in two months.

=== Capture of the Kien Chan forts, 18 November 1859 ===
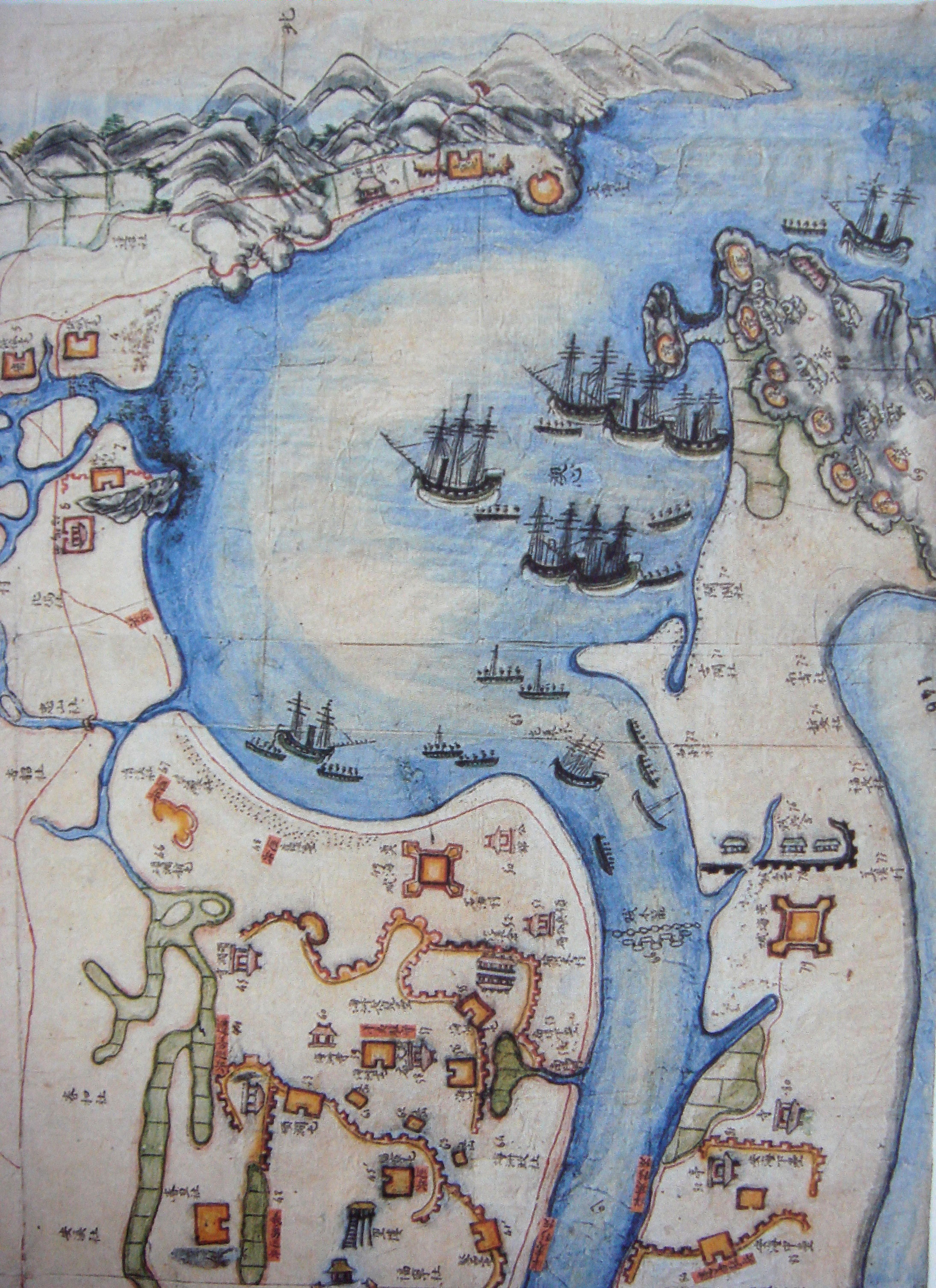
French order of battle (detail of a contemporary Vietnamese map).

In the autumn of 1859, Rigault de Genouilly, whose conduct of the war had come under criticism, was repatriated to France and replaced in command of the allied expedition by Rear Admiral François Page. Page disembarked in Tourane on 19 October, and immediately after his arrival offered peace terms to the Vietnamese: an end to the persecution of Christians, the installation of French consuls in Vietnam and certain commercial privileges. These were relatively moderate terms, but the Vietnamese did not accept them. Instead, they spun out the negotiations, believing that the French would eventually leave Vietnam empty-handed.

Page thereupon ordered a third attack on the Vietnamese siege lines at Tourane. The attack was directed against the Kien Chan forts, to the north of Tourane Bay, which barred the route to Huế. Its chief purpose was political rather than military, namely to impress upon the Vietnamese that the French were not prepared to make peace at any price. On 18 November 1859, Némésis and Phlégéton (towed respectively by Prégent and Norzagaray, a dispatch vessel recently bought at Manila), the gunboats Avalanche and Alarme, the transport Marne and the Spanish dispatch vessel Jorgo Juan (which had replaced El Caño) anchored off the Kien Chan forts and opened a devastating bombardment. Before long the allied warships had wrecked the forts and dismounted their cannon. The casualties were not all on the Vietnamese side, however. Lieutenant Colonel Dupré-Déroulède, the senior French engineering officer, was cut in two by a cannonball while standing on the bridge of Némésis. The same shot killed a French sailor, wounded several others, and spattered Admiral Page with blood. Once the forts were silenced a French landing force was put ashore and found that the Vietnamese had abandoned their positions. Once again the French had won a fine tactical victory, overwhelming the Vietnamese defenders and capturing the forts, but once again the victory had no strategic significance.

=== Allied evacuation of Tourane, 22 March 1860 ===
Eventually the French decided to evacuate Tourane and concentrate their efforts around Saigon. Preparations for a methodical evacuation began in February 1860. The French and Spaniards disarmed and blew up one by one the Vietnamese forts they had occupied and burned their barrack huts. The last soldiers of the landing force re-embarked on 22 March 1860, without hindrance from the Vietnamese. The only trace left behind of the twenty-month Franco-Spanish occupation of the Tourane peninsula was a cemetery in which the allied dead had been buried.

== Aftermath ==
The Tourane expedition had tied down French resources unprofitably and drained French manpower, and the eventual evacuation of Tourane was an embarrassing confession of failure. Tự Đức was immensely encouraged by the outcome of the siege, and had the news of the allied evacuation proclaimed throughout Vietnam.

In the long run, however, the failure of the expedition made no difference to the course of the war. The military stalemate around Saigon was broken in 1861, when the ending of the war with China freed French military resources for action in Vietnam, by an important French and Spanish victory at Ky Hoa. The allies now began to gain the upper hand. In April 1861, Mỹ Tho was captured. In early 1862, the French captured Biên Hòa and Vĩnh Long. These victories forced the Vietnamese to sue for peace in April 1862. By then, the French were not in a merciful mood. What had begun as a minor punitive expedition had turned into a long, bitter and costly war. It was unthinkable that France should emerge from this struggle empty-handed, and Tự Đức was forced to cede the three southernmost provinces of Vietnam (Biên Hòa, Gia Định and Định Tường) to France. Thus, the French colony of Cochinchina was born, with its capital at Saigon.
