= Da Nang Bay =

- Tourane Bay
- Vịnh Đà Nẵng (Vietnamese)
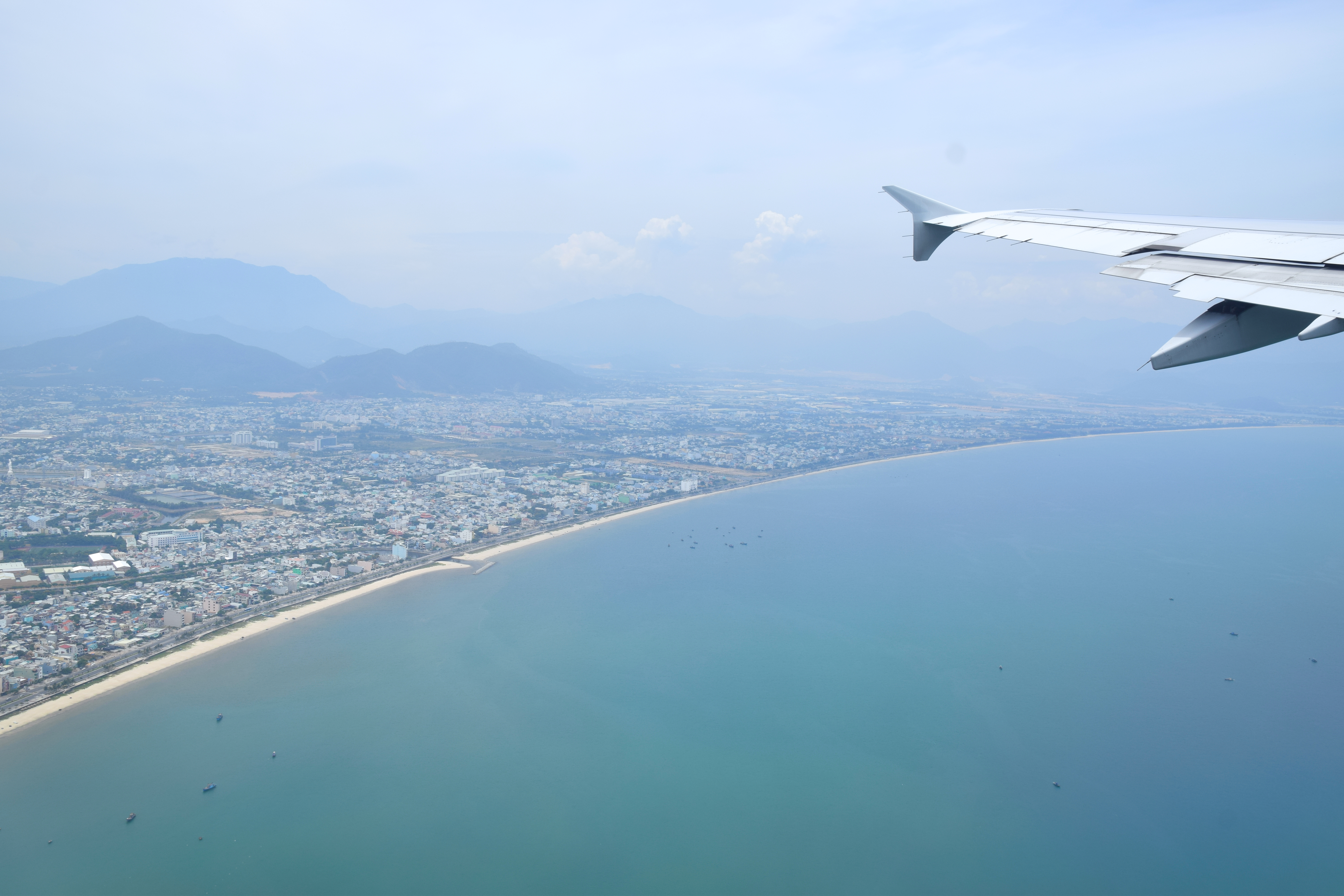
- Aerial view of Da Nang Bay

- Location within Da Nang Location within Vietnam
- Location: Da Nang
- Coordinates: 16°07′52″N 108°10′37″E
- Type: bay
- River sources: Hàn River, Cu Đê River
- Ocean/sea sources: South China Sea
- Basin countries: Vietnam
- Surface area: 116 square kilometres (45 sq mi)
- Average depth: 8–10 metres (26–33 ft)
- Settlements: Da Nang

Da Nang Bay (Vietnamese: Vịnh Đà Nẵng), formerly known as Tourane Bay, is a bay of the South China Sea along the coast of Da Nang, Vietnam. The bay is entered between the Sơn Trà Peninsula and the Hải Vân Mountain, 4 miles Northwest.

The bay has an area of 116 square kilometres (45 sq mi), a coastline of 46 kilometres (29 mi) and adequate depths of 8–10 metres (26–33 ft). It offers good shelter at all seasons for vessels of any size. The bottom of the bay is mostly sandy, while some areas have corals and rocks. A layer of mud is immediately above this sandy bottom, making up 80% of the bay's floor.

The port of Da Nang is located in the bay at the mouth of the Hàn River.

== See also ==
- Media related to Da Nang Bay at Wikimedia Commons
- Hàn River (Vietnam)
- Da Nang Port
