= Nguyễn Bá Thanh =

Vietnamese politician

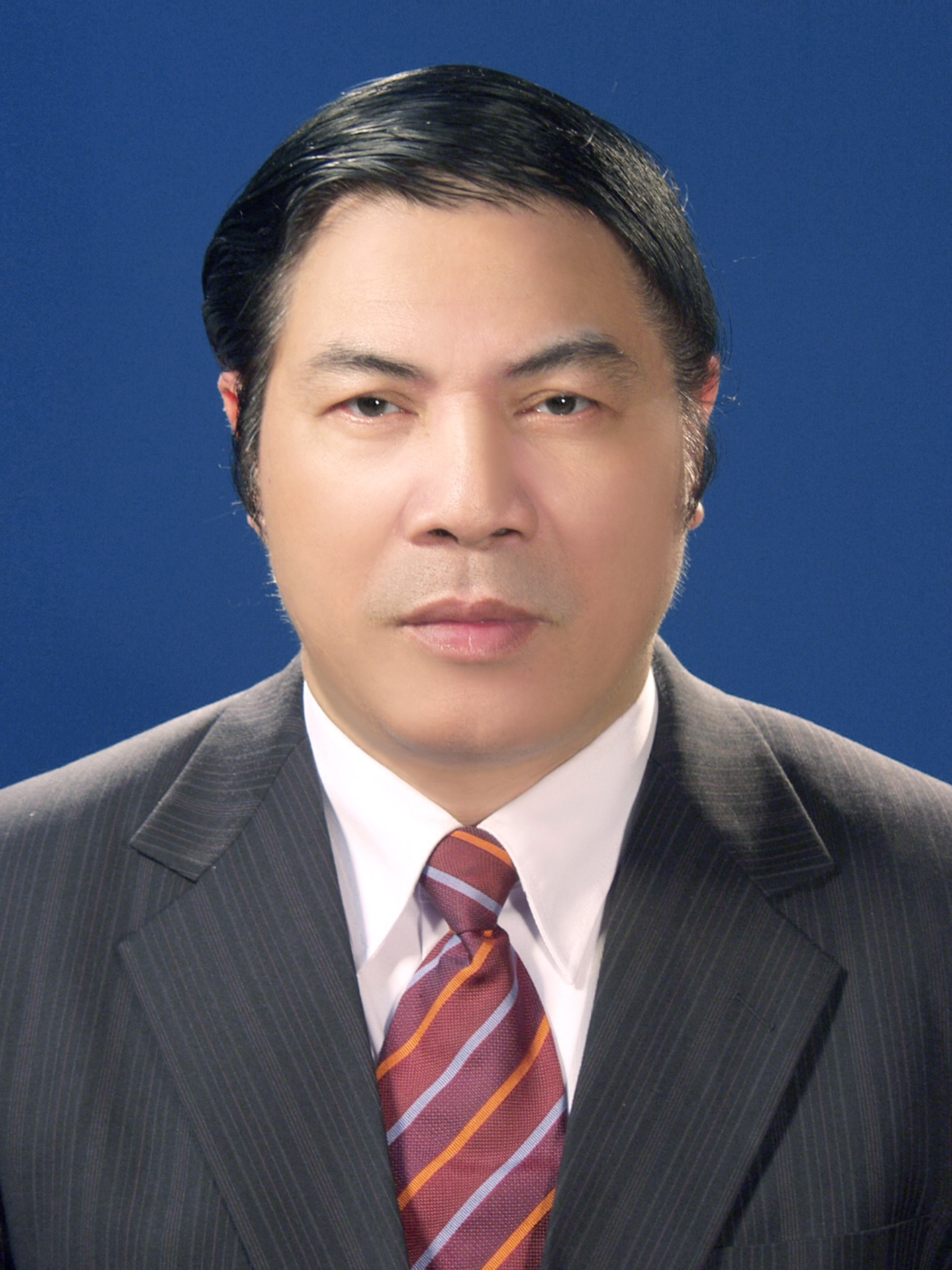
- Thanh in 2012

Chairman of Central Committee for Internal Affairs Communist Party of Vietnam
- In office 1 January 2013 – 13 February 2015 (died)
- Preceded by: Trương Vĩnh Trọng
- Succeeded by: Phan Đình Trạc

Chairman of Da Nang city People's Council
- In office 23 July 2003 – 1 April 2013
- Preceded by: Nguyễn Đức Hạt
- Succeeded by: Trần Thọ

Secretary of Da Nang city Political party committee
- In office 23 June 2003 – 19 February 2013
- Preceded by: Nguyễn Đức Hạt
- Succeeded by: Trần Thọ

Chairman of People's Committee of Da Nang city
- In office 1 January 1997 – 23 July 2003
- Succeeded by: Huỳnh Năm

Member of the Central Committee of the Communist Party of Vietnam
- In office 25 April 2006 – 13 February 2015 (died)

Personal details
- Born: 8 April 1953 Hoa Vang, Quang Nam, State of Vietnam
- Died: 13 February 2015 (aged 61) Cam Le, Da Nang, Vietnam
- Party: CPV
- Spouse: Lê Thị Quý
- Children: Nguyễn Bá Cảnh; Nguyễn Thị Hoài An
- Education: Vietnam National University of Agriculture; Ho Chi Minh National Academy of Politics
- Awards: First Class Independence Medal

Nguyễn Bá Thanh (18 April 1953 – 13 February 2015) was a Vietnamese politician.

He was party secretary and people's council president in Da Nang (two of the three top leadership positions), member of the Central Committee of the Communist Party of Vietnam and head of the PCC Internal Affairs Commission, a central committee consulting agency for internal policies and strategies. He formerly served as President of the People's Committee of Da Nang City.

== Early life ==
Nguyễn Bá Thanh was born on April 8, 1953, from Hòa Vang, Đà Nẵng. He was the 14th generation of the Nguyễn Bá family in Hòa Tiến. His father was Nguyễn Bá Tùng. He had an older sister who was four years older named Nguyễn Thị Hoa. In 1954, after the Geneva Agreement, his father went North while his mother, his sister, and he stayed in Đà Nẵng. His sister died at age 10 due to an illness which could not be treated due to financial reasons. He also had a younger brother named Nguyễn Bá Bình. Nguyễn Bá Bình married Thái Thủy, and they had three children named Nguyễn Bá Trung, Nguyễn Thị Hiếu, and Nguyễn Bá Hậu.

After graduating from Hanoi University of Agriculture, he was assigned to work as an agricultural officer. He was then promoted to Manager of Hòa Nhơn Cooperative and admitted to the Communist Party of Vietnam on 13 February 1980.

== Global Magnitsky Human Rights Accountability Act ==
According to Radio Free Asia, Nguyen Ba Thanh was included in a submitted Global Magnitsky Human Rights Accountability Act blacklist to be blocked from entering the United States or making transactions in all property.

== Controversies ==
Da Nang has been planned and expanded during the last 10 years resulting in the relocation of almost one-third of the city's former inhabitants for urban planning. Thanh was sued by some of these but he was acquitted by official investigations which purportedly showed that all his actions were in accordance with the law. Thanh was elected to the National Assembly.

Nguyễn Bá Thanh was also accused of involvement in a major corruption case, in which the contractor building the Han River Bridge, Phạm Minh Thông, was arrested. According to Radio Free Asia, the People's Procuracy of Da Nang City concluded in the Document No. 73/KSDT-KT (October, 2000) and Document No. 77/KSDT/KT (November 2000) sent to the Supreme People's Procuracy of Vietnam and Phan Diễn (then-Secretary of Communist Party Committee of Danang) that Nguyễn Bá Thanh received bribes from Pham Minh Thong (4.4 billion VND in total) in the construction projects of Hàn River Bridge and North-South Street in Danang. However, the case was eventually dropped. Vietnamese mass media (which, according to Human Rights Watch, are all strictly controlled by the government) were censored and even praised Thanh for his "many contributions" in the development of Da Nang City.

The article alleges that recent reports from the Central Directing Office of Anti-Corruption submitted to the Prime Minister of Vietnam and the Secretary of the Central Committee of the Communist Party of Vietnam confirmed that accusations of Nguyễn Bá Thanh's corruption by some citizens of Da Nang are legitimate. In addition, two conclusions of inspection by the Ministry of Public Security indicated sufficient grounds to open the case, but the Police Department of Da Nang City have not charged Nguyễn Bá Thanh with any offense to date.

In 2009, several high-ranking Vietnamese police officers, including Major General Trần Văn Thanh (Chief Inspector of the Ministry of Public Security of Vietnam), Lieutenant Colonel Dương Ngọc Tiến (Chief Representative of Hồ Chí Minh City's Police's Newspaper in Hanoi), and a former police major were arrested and sentenced to jail. All were accused of "abusing democratic freedoms of association, expression, assembly to infringe on the interests of the state". According to an article from Radio Free Asia, general Trần Văn Thanh was fighting against corruption and trying to expose Nguyễn Bá Thanh, albeit without success.

Legal scholar Cù Huy Hà Vũ has commented in some interviews that he believes this case was created to punish anti-corruption activists, and that "police general Trần Văn Thanh had directed the investigation of corruption cases directly related to Nguyễn Bá Thanh (who at that time was President of People's Committee of Da Nang City)". Vũ claimed the court case was an instrument of revenge by Nguyễn Bá Thanh.

Talking to Radio Free Asia, Đỗ Xuân Hiền, a former Head of Economics in Da Nang and General District Commissioner, revealed how Nguyễn Bá Thanh became rich through urban planning and relocation implementation: "Nguyễn Bá Thanh took the land from people, for each square meter he gave them only 19,500 VND as compensation, while having demanded 150,000 VND per m² for himself from contractors, try asking a how many times fold! Thus is it corruption, bribery or not?" According to an annual report of Human Rights Watch, land seizures and local corruption are the main grievances in Vietnam recently.

== Death ==
On 13 February 2015, Nguyễn Bá Thanh died at his home at age 61 after going to Singapore and United States for cancer treatment.
