= Trần Thị Lý Bridge =

Bridge in Da Nang, Vietnam

Coordinates: 16.05027°N 108.22944°E

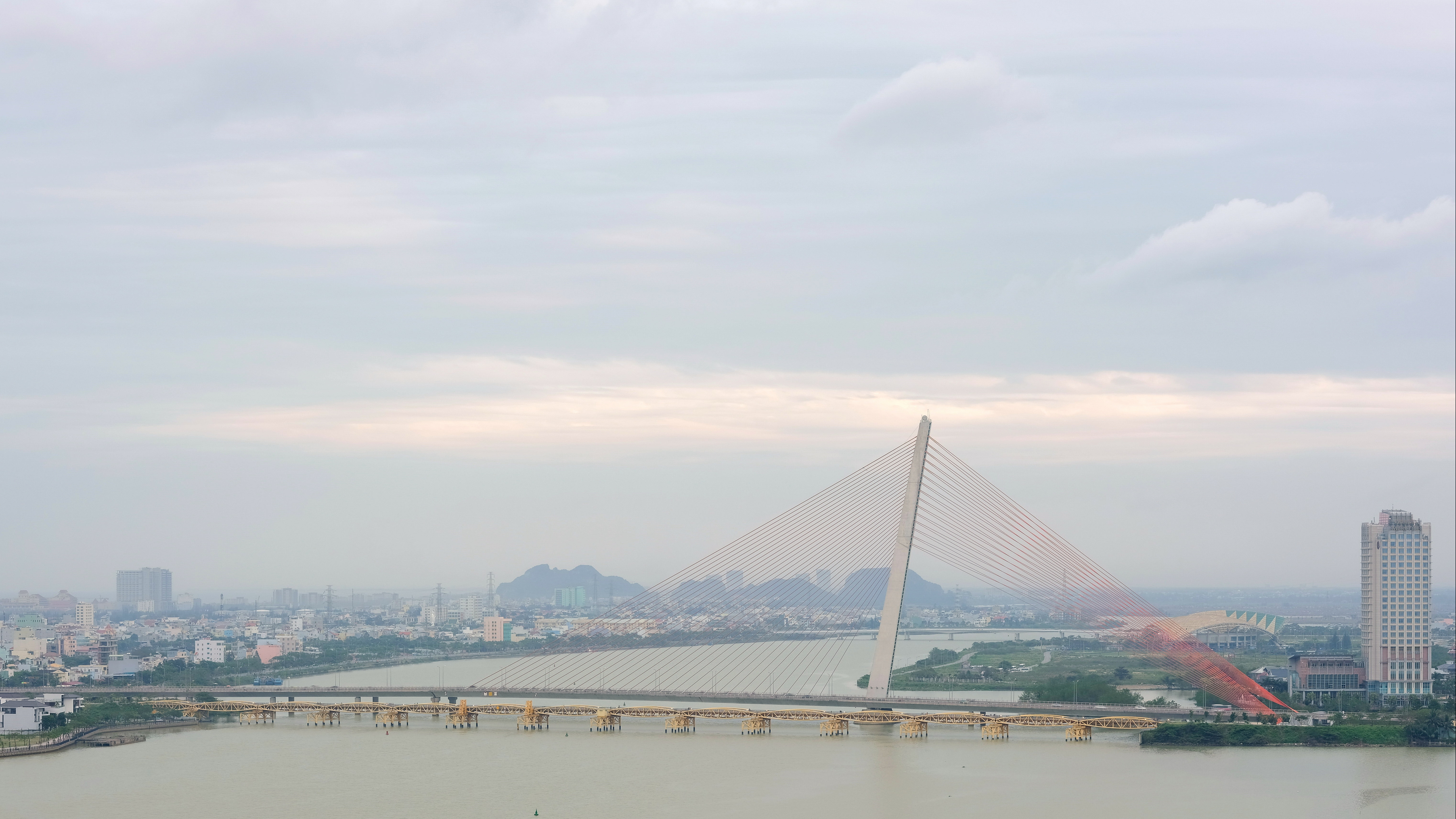
Trần Thị Lý Bridge in the morning

The Nguyễn Văn Trỗi–Trần Thị Lý Bridge (Vietnamese: Cầu Nguyễn Văn Trỗi–Trần Thị Lý) is a cable-stayed bridge completed in 2013 crossing the Hàn River in Đà Nẵng, Vietnam. It connects Hai Chau district, Son Tra district, and Ngu Hanh Son district in the city. The new bridge replaces two older bridges named after Nguyễn Văn Trỗi and Trần Thị Lý. The bridge has a total length of 731 metres and a total height of 145 metres.

== History ==
At the same location in 1951, French Indochina built the first bridge in Đà Nẵng, the De Lattre De Tassigny Bridge. In 1955, the bridge was renamed the Trình Minh Thế Bridge (after a general of the army of the Republic of Vietnam). In 1975, it was renamed Trần Thị Lý Bridge. Due to the age of the bridge, construction of a new bridge began in April 2009, with the total investment being 497.7 billion VND. After four years, this bridge was open on March 29, 2013.
