= Nguyễn Văn Trỗi Bridge =

Bridge in Da Nang, Vietnam

Nguyen Van Troi Bridge is a bridge spanning the Han River in the city of Da Nang, Vietnam. The bridge was built by an American company in 1965. Constructed by the American contractor RMK [RMK-BRJ], the 513 meters bridge was the first bridge designed for vehicles crossing the Han River to transport weapons.

The bridge was reinforced in 1978 and 1996, allowing the bridge be vertically raised for boats to pass below, and remained the only bridge prior to the Han River Bridge coming into operation in 2000.

After being renovated at a cost of $1 million in 2013, the bridge became the only pedestrianised bridge.
