= Foreign Languages Publishing House =

Foreign Languages Publishing House may refer to:

- Foreign Languages Publishing House (North Korea), Pyongyang
- Foreign Languages Publishing House (Soviet Union), Moscow
- Foreign Languages Publishing House (Vietnam), Hanoi

== See also ==
- Foreign Languages Press, Beijing, China
