= Hàn River (Vietnam) =

River in Da Nang city, Vietnam

Hàn River Tourane River, Danang River
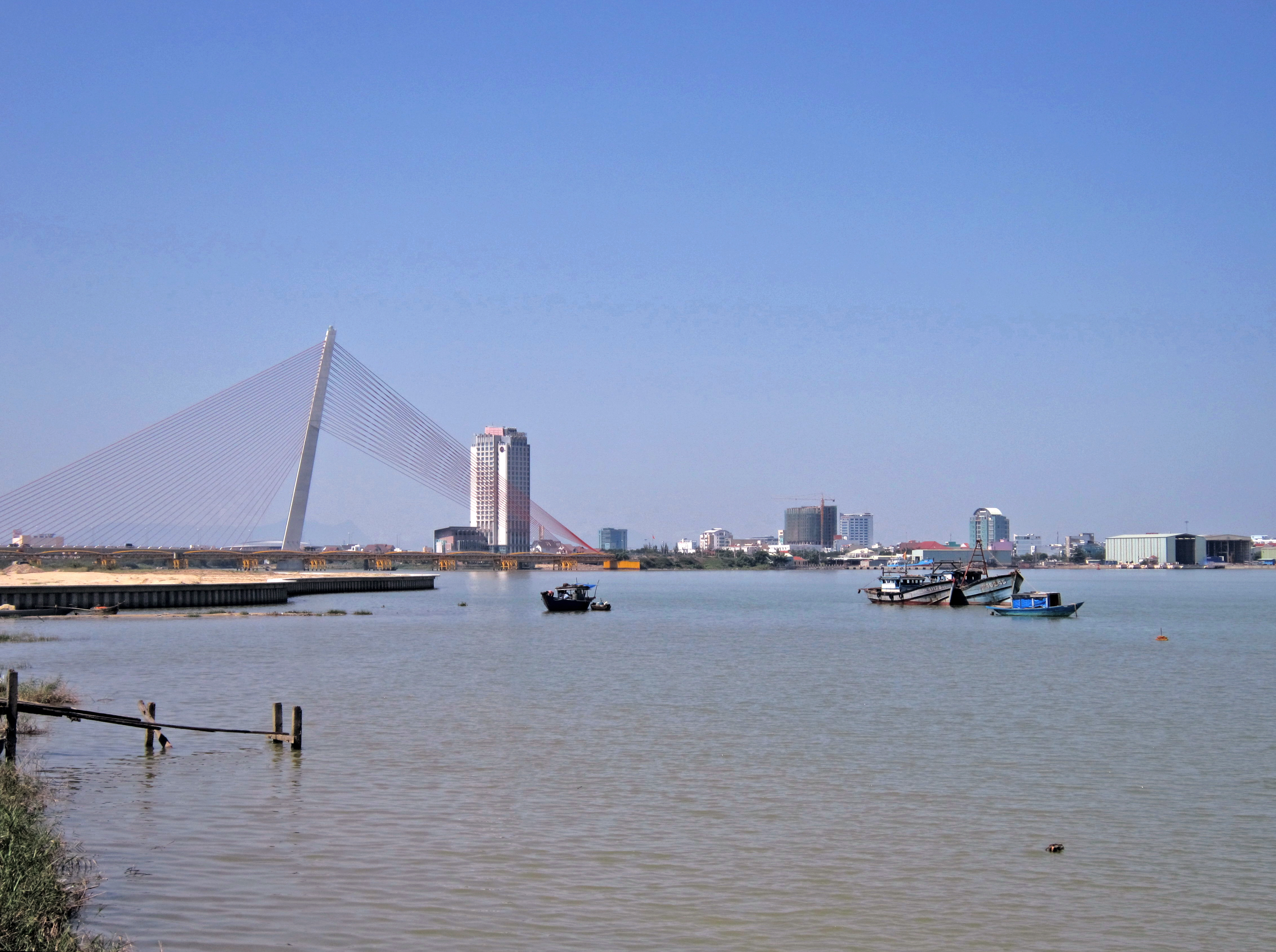
- The Hàn River near Trần Thị Lý Bridge.

- Location within Da Nang Location within Vietnam
- Native name: sông Hàn (Vietnamese)

Location
- Country: Vietnam
- Region: South Central Coast
- Cities: Da Nang

Physical characteristics
- Source: Confluence of Cẩm Lệ and Đò Toản
  - location: boundary between Hòa Xuân, Ngũ Hành Sơn, and Hòa Cường
  - coordinates: 16°01′45″N 108°13′52″E
- Mouth: Da Nang Bay (South China Sea)
  - location: boundary between Hải Châu, Sơn Trà
  - coordinates: 16°05′49″N 108°13′13″E
- Length: 9.8 km
- Width
  - average: 900 - 1200 m
- Depth
  - average: 4 - 5 m

Basin features
- Bridges: Tiên Sơn Bridge, Trần Thị Lý Bridge, Nguyễn Văn Trỗi Bridge, Dragon Bridge, Hàn River Bridge, Thuận Phước Bridge

The Hàn River (Vietnamese: sông Hàn (滝瀚)) is a river entirely located in the city of Da Nang, Vietnam.

It is formed at the confluence of the Cẩm Lệ and the Đò Toản, where they join at the tripoint of the Da Nang city wards Hòa Xuân, Ngũ Hành Sơn, and Hòa Cường. From that confluence, the Hàn River flows north for about 9.8 km, through the city center, under six bridges (Tiên Sơn Bridge, Trần Thị Lý Bridge, Nguyễn Văn Trỗi Bridge, Dragon Bridge, Hàn River Bridge, Thuận Phước Bridge), before emptying into the Da Nang Bay.

== See also ==
- Hàn River Bridge
