= List of bridges in Vietnam =

== Historical and architectural interest bridges ==
Between 1872 and 1889, many bridges were designed by the Eiffel company, created in 1863 by Gustave Eiffel, when Vietnam was part of the French Indochina. However, some works are inadvertently attributed to the Eiffel company, the Truong Tien Bridge was designed by the company Schneider et Cie and Cie de Letellier while the Long Biên Bridge was designed by Daydé et Pillé, the latter having joined the Eiffel group only in 1964, which may have caused confusion.

	Name	Vietnamese	Distinction	Length	Type	Carries Crosses	Opened	Location	Region	Ref.
1	Japanese Bridge	Chùa Cầu	Hội An Ancient Town; World Heritage Site	18 m (59 ft)	Covered; Wood, masonry piers	Footbridge; Outlet of Thu Bồn River	1595	Hội An; 15°52′37.6″N 108°19′33.7″E	South Central Coast	
2	Thanh Toàn Tile-roofed Bridge	Cầu ngói Thanh Toàn	National monument	17 m (56 ft)	Covered; Wood	Footbridge	1776	Huế; 16°28′00.4″N 107°38′33.7″E	North Central Coast	
3	Thê Húc Bridge	Cầu Thê Húc			Trestle	Footbridge; Hoàn Kiếm Lake	1865	Hanoi; 21°01′50.8″N 105°51′09.9″E	Red River Delta	(Note: The original wooden bridge was destroyed in 1953 and rebuilt identically but in concrete.)
4	Mong Bridge	Cầu Mống	Conception by the Eiffel company	128 m (420 ft)	Arch; Steel deck arch	Footbridge; Bến Nghé Channel	1882	Ho Chi Minh City; 10°46′04.9″N 106°42′13.3″E	Southeast	(Note: Also called Pont des Messageries maritimes.)
5	Truong Tien Bridge	Cầu Trường Tiền		403 m (1,322 ft)	Truss; Steel	Trần Hưng Đạo - Hùng Vương; Perfume River	1900	Huế; 16°28′08.0″N 107°35′19.8″E	North Central Coast	
6	Long Biên Bridge	Cầu Long Biên		1,682 m (5,518 ft)	Cantilever; Steel; Rail-road bridge	Road bridge Hanoi–Lào Cai railway Red River	1903	Hanoi; 21°02′40.0″N 105°51′41.1″E	Red River Delta	(Note: Also called Paul Doumer Bridge. The road part was added in 1924.)
7	Hekou-Lao Cai Railway Bridge		China–Vietnam border		Truss; Steel	Hanoi–Lào Cai railway Nanxi River		Lào Cai–Hekou Yao Autonomous County; 22°30′31.1″N 103°57′53.5″E	Northwest; China	
8	Hàn River Bridge	Cầu Sông Hàn		488 m (1,601 ft)	Cable-stayed; Swing bridge	Road bridge Hàn River	2000	Da Nang; 16°04′19.8″N 108°13′36.6″E	South Central Coast	
9	Golden Bridge (Vietnam)	Cầu Vàng		150 m (490 ft)	Beam; Steel	Footbridge; Bà Nà Hills	2018	Da Nang; 15°59′42.2″N 107°59′46.9″E	South Central Coast	
10	Bạch Long Glass Bridge	Cầu kính Bạch Long	Glass Bridge; Height: 150 m (490 ft)	290 m (950 ft)	Suspension; Steel and glass deck, concrete pylons	Footbridge	2022	Mộc Châu; 20°50′56.4″N 104°34′11.1″E	Northwest	

== Major bridges ==
This table presents a non-exhaustive list of the road and railway bridges with spans greater than 100 metres (328 ft) or total lengths longer than 5,000 metres (16,404 ft).

	Name	Vietnamese	Span	Length	Type	Carries Crosses	Opened	Location	Region	Ref.
1	Cần Thơ Bridge	Cầu Cần Thơ	550 m (1,800 ft)	2,750 m (9,020 ft)	Cable-stayed; Concrete and steel box girder deck, concrete pylons 150+550+150	National Route 1 Bassac River	2010	Cần Thơ; 10°02′05.6″N 105°48′46.3″E	Mekong Delta	
2	Vàm Cống Bridge	Cầu Vàm Cống	450 m (1,480 ft)	2,970 m (9,740 ft)	Cable-stayed; Composite steel/concrete deck, concrete pylons 210+450+210	North–South Expressway West; Bassac River	2019	Long Xuyên; 10°19′00.5″N 105°30′13.7″E	Mekong Delta	
3	Bãi Cháy Bridge	Cầu Bãi Cháy	435 m (1,427 ft)	1,106 m (3,629 ft)	Cable-stayed; Concrete box girder deck, concrete pylons 86+129+435+129+87	National Route 18; Hạ Long Bay	2006	Hạ Long; 20°57′37.2″N 107°03′58.1″E	Northeast	
4	Thuận Phước Bridge	Cầu Thuận Phước	405 m (1,329 ft)	1,855 m (6,086 ft)	Suspension; Steel box girder deck, concrete pylons 125+405+125	Nguyễn Tất Thành; Hàn River	2009	Da Nang; 16°05′42.4″N 108°13′14.4″E	South Central Coast	
5	Phú Mỹ Bridge	Cầu Phú Mỹ	380 m (1,250 ft)	2,101 m (6,893 ft)	Cable-stayed; Concrete deck, concrete pylons 162+380+162	Đường Vành Đai Trong; Saigon River	2009	Ho Chi Minh City; 10°44′41.8″N 106°44′39.5″E	Southeast	
6	Bình Khánh Bridge under construction	Cầu Bình Khánh	375 m (1,230 ft)	12,104 m (39,711 ft)	Cable-stayed; Concrete pylons 187+375+187	Ben Luc – Long Thanh Expressway; HCMC Ring Road 3 Soài Rạp	2023	Ho Chi Minh City; 10°39′34.7″N 106°44′18.7″E	Southeast	(Note: The viaduct including Bình Khánh Bridge, Phước Khánh Bridge, Sông Chà Bridge and Bình Khánh Bridge (west bridge) is continuous from Km20+347 to Km32+451.)
7	Mỹ Thuận Bridge	Cầu Mỹ Thuận	350 m (1,150 ft)	1,535 m (5,036 ft)	Cable-stayed; Concrete deck, concrete pylons 150+350+150	National Route 1 Sông Tiền (Mekong)	2000	Vĩnh Long; 10°16′38.9″N 105°54′36.2″E	Mekong Delta	
8	Cao Lãnh Bridge	Cầu Cao Lãnh	350 m (1,150 ft)	2,010 m (6,590 ft)	Cable-stayed; Concrete deck, concrete pylons 150+350+150	North–South Expressway West; Mekong	2018	Cao Lãnh (city); 10°24′44.8″N 105°39′07.0″E	Mekong Delta	
9	Mỹ Thuận 2 Bridge under construction	Cầu Mỹ Thuận 2	350 m (1,150 ft)	2,330 m (7,640 ft)	Cable-stayed; Concrete deck, concrete pylons 150+350+150	North–South Expressway East; Sông Tiền (Mekong)	2023	Vĩnh Long; 10°16′34.0″N 105°54′25.7″E	Mekong Delta	
10	Nhật Tân Bridge	Cầu Nhật Tân	300 m (980 ft)(x4)	3,080 m (10,100 ft)	Cable-stayed; Composite steel/concrete deck, 5 concrete pylons 150+4x300+150	Road bridge Red River	2015	Hanoi; 21°05′38.9″N 105°49′16.7″E	Red River Delta	
11	Phước Khánh Bridge under construction	Cầu Phước Khánh	300 m (980 ft)	12,104 m (39,711 ft)	Cable-stayed; Concrete pylons 149+300+149	Ben Luc – Long Thanh Expressway; HCMC Ring Road 3 Sông Lòng Tàu	2023	Ho Chi Minh City; 10°39′50.0″N 106°47′46.9″E	Southeast	
12	Rạch Miễu Bridge	Cầu Rạch Miễu	270 m (890 ft)	2,868 m (9,409 ft)	Cable-stayed; Concrete deck, concrete pylons 117+270+117	National Route 60; Sông Tiền (Mekong)	2008	Cao Lãnh (city); 10°20′39″N 106°20′31.6″E	Mekong Delta	
13	Rạch Miễu 2 Bridge under construction	Cầu Rạch Miễu 2	270 m (890 ft)	1,954 m (6,411 ft)	Cable-stayed; Concrete deck, concrete pylons	Road bridge Sông Tiền (Mekong)	2026	Cao Lãnh (city); 10°20′14.9″N 106°18′51.2″E	Mekong Delta	
14	Bính Bridge	Cầu Bính	260 m (850 ft)	1,280 m (4,200 ft)	Cable-stayed; Composite steel/concrete deck, concrete pylons 100+260+100	TL359; Cấm River	2005	Haiphong; 20°52′31.8″N 106°40′03.6″E	Red River Delta	
15	Bạch Đằng Bridge	Cầu Bạch Đằng	250 m (820 ft)(x2)	3,040 m (9,970 ft)	Cable-stayed; Composite steel/concrete deck, 3 concrete pylons 100+2x250+100	Ha Long-Haiphong Expy; Bạch Đằng River; Cấm River	2016	Haiphong; 20°50′53.1″N 106°45′55.6″E	Red River Delta	
16	Trần Thị Lý Bridge	Cầu Trần Thị Lý	230 m (750 ft)	731 m (2,398 ft)	Cable-stayed; Concrete box girder deck, concrete pylons 4x50+230+45+4x50	Trần Thị Lý; Hàn River	2014	Da Nang; 16°03′00.9″N 108°13′46.6″E	South Central Coast	
17	Kiền Bridge	Cầu Kiền	200 m (660 ft)	1,186 m (3,891 ft)	Cable-stayed; Concrete box girder deck, concrete pylons 85+200+85	National Route 10; Cấm River	2003	Haiphong; 20°54′48.2″N 106°37′23.9″E	Red River Delta	
18	Dragon Bridge	Cầu Rồng	200 m (660 ft)	666 m (2,185 ft)	Arch; Steel through arch, composite steel/concrete deck 128+200+128	Nguyễn Văn Linh; Hàn River	2013	Da Nang; 16°03′40.1″N 108°13′37.9″E	South Central Coast	
19	Hoàng Văn Thụ Bridge	Cầu Hoàng Văn Thụ	200 m (660 ft)(x2)		Arch; CFST through arch 45+200+45	Road bridge Cấm River	2019	Haiphong; 20°51′58.6″N 106°40′52.8″E	Red River Delta	
20	Ba Son Bridge	Cầu Ba Son	200 m (660 ft)	886 m (2,907 ft)	Cable-stayed; Composite steel/concrete deck, 1 concrete pylon	Road bridge Saigon River	2022	Ho Chi Minh City; 10°46′47.5″N 106°42′34.6″E	Southeast	
21	Thanh Hóa Bridge (1905) destroyed in 1945	Cầu Thanh Hóa	162 m (531 ft)	162 m (531 ft)	Arch; Steel tied arch Bow-string bridge	North–South railway Ma River	1904	Thanh Hóa; 19°50′17.6″N 105°47′38.7″E	North Central Coast	(Note: Also called Cầu Hàm Rồng (Hàm Rồng Bridge).)
22	Cửa Hội Bridge	Cầu Cửa Hội	153 m (502 ft)	1,729 m (5,673 ft)	Extradosed; Concrete box girder deck, concrete pylons 86+153+86	Road bridge Cả River	2021	Vinh; 18°45′08.9″N 105°44′42.3″E	North Central Coast	
23	Hàm Luông Bridge	Cầu Hàm Luông	150 m (490 ft)(x3)	1,277 m (4,190 ft)	Box girder Prestressed concrete 90+3x150+90	National Route 60; Hàm Luông River	2010	Mường Lay; 10°14′06.2″N 106°20′03.5″E	Mekong Delta	
24	Bình Lợi Road Bridge	Cầu đường bộ Bình Lợi	150 m (490 ft)		Arch; Steel tied-arch	Phạm Văn Đồng; Saigon River	2014	Ho Chi Minh City; 10°49′28.8″N 106°42′34.4″E	Southeast	
25	Cổ Chiên Bridge	Cầu Cổ Chiên	150 m (490 ft)(x3)	1,599 m (5,246 ft)	Box girder Prestressed concrete 90+3x150+90	National Route 60; Cổ Chiên River	2015	Càng Long district–Mỏ Cày Nam district 10°01′42.7″N 106°18′21.8″E	Mekong Delta	
26	Cửa Đại Bridge	Cầu Cửa Đại	150 m (490 ft)(x3)	1,480 m (4,860 ft)	Box girder Prestressed concrete 2x70+2x120+3x150	Thu Bồn River	2015	Hội An; 15°51′54.1″N 108°22′36.1″E	South Central Coast	
27	Đình Vũ – Cát Hải Bridge	Cầu Đình Vũ – Cát Hải	150 m (490 ft)(x3)	5,440 m (17,850 ft)	Box girder Prestressed concrete 95+2x150+95	Road bridge Cấm River delta	2017	Haiphong–Cát Hải district 20°48′24.9″N 106°50′25.1″E	Red River Delta	
28	Nhật Lệ 2 Bridge	Cầu Nhật Lệ 2	150 m (490 ft)(x2)	515 m (1,690 ft)	Cable-stayed; Concrete deck, 1 concrete pylon 2x150	Road bridge Nhật Lệ River	2017	Đồng Hới; 17°26′57.0″N 106°38′13.7″E	North Central Coast	
29	Hưng Hà Bridge	Cầu Hưng Hà	150 m (490 ft)(x3)	2,118 m (6,949 ft)	Box girder Prestressed concrete 97+3x150+97	Road bridge Red River	2019	Hưng Yên–Chân Lý; 20°36′52.2″N 106°05′36.2″E	Red River Delta	
30	Hang Tôm Bridge dismantled in 2011	Cầu Hang Tôm	140 m (460 ft)		Suspension; Steel truss deck, concrete pylons	National Route 12; Black River	1973	Lai Châu; 22°04′28.5″N 103°10′46.6″E	Northwest	
31	Sông Chà Bridge under construction	Cầu Sông Chà	140 m (460 ft)	12,104 m (39,711 ft)	Box girder Prestressed concrete 86+140+86	Ben Luc – Long Thanh Expressway; HCMC Ring Road 3 Sông Chà	2023	Ho Chi Minh City; 10°39′04.0″N 106°45′48.9″E	Southeast	
32	Vĩnh Tuy Bridge	Cầu Vĩnh Tuy	135 m (443 ft)(x6)	3,690 m (12,110 ft)	Box girder Prestressed concrete 90+6x135+90	Đường dẫn cầu Vĩnh Tuy - Minh Khai; Red River	2007	Hanoi; 21°00′19.9″N 105°52′38.0″E	Red River Delta	
33	Móng Sến Bridge	Cầu Móng Sến	132 m (433 ft)(x3)	612 m (2,008 ft)	Box girder Prestressed concrete 84+3x132+85	National Route 4D	2022	Trung Chải; 22°24′45.3″N 103°54′02.2″E	Northwest	
34	Tạ Khoa Bridge	Cầu Tạ Khoa	130 m (430 ft)(x2)	582 m (1,909 ft)	Box girder Prestressed concrete 78+2x130+78	National Route 37; Black River	2003	Bắc Yên district 21°12′28.8″N 104°22′09.0″E	Northwest	
35	Thanh Trì Bridge	Cầu Thanh Trì	130 m (430 ft)(x4)	3,046 m (9,993 ft)	Box girder Prestressed concrete 80+4x130+80	Red River	2006	Hanoi; 20°59′37.6″N 105°54′06.5″E	Red River Delta	
36	Pá Uôn Bridge	Cầu Pá Uôn	130 m (430 ft)(x4)	938 m (3,077 ft)	Box girder Prestressed concrete 75+4x130+75	National Route 279; Black River	2011	Chiềng Ơn; 21°41′40.8″N 103°36′56.5″E	Northwest	
37	Lai Hà Bridge	Cầu Lai Hà	130 m (430 ft)	296 m (971 ft)	Box girder Prestressed concrete 75+130+75	ĐT127; Nam Na river		Mường Lay; 22°05′51.2″N 103°09′59.9″E	Northwest	
38	Tân Đệ Bridge	Cầu Tân Đệ	120 m (390 ft)(x3)	1,067 m (3,501 ft)	Box girder Prestressed concrete 70+3x120+78	National Route 10; Red River	2002	Nam Định–Thái Bình; 20°26′37.0″N 106°13′08.4″E	Red River Delta	
39	Yên Lệnh Bridge	Cầu Yên Lệnh	120 m (390 ft)(x5)	2,230 m (7,320 ft)	Box girder Prestressed concrete 90+5x120+90	National Route 38; Red River	2004	Hưng Yên; 20°39′29.3″N 106°02′07.6″E	Red River Delta	
40	Thị Nại Bridge	Cầu Thị Nại	120 m (390 ft)(x3)	2,477 m (8,127 ft)	Box girder Prestressed concrete 70+3x120+70	Trần Hưng Đạo - TL639; Thị Nại Port	2006	Qui Nhơn; 13°48′49.7″N 109°14′25.1″E	South Central Coast	
41	Thủ Thiêm Bridge	Cầu Thủ Thiêm	120 m (390 ft)	766 m (2,513 ft)	Box girder Prestressed concrete V-shaped legs 80+120+80	Trần Văn Khê; Saigon River	2008	Ho Chi Minh City; 10°47′08.3″N 106°43′06.6″E	Southeast	
42	Thủ Biên Bridge	Cầu Thủ Biên	120 m (390 ft)	510 m (1,670 ft)	Box girder Prestressed concrete 75+120+75	TL 746 / TL 768; Đồng Nai river	2010	Biên Hòa; 11°01′52.1″N 106°54′42.1″E	Southeast	
43	New Hang Tôm Bridge	Cầu Hang Tôm mới	120 m (390 ft)	362 m (1,188 ft)	Box girder Prestressed concrete	National Route 12; Black River	2010	Mường Lay; 22°04′44.4″N 103°10′23.3″E	Northwest	
44	Rào 2 Bridge	Cầu Rào 2	120 m (390 ft)	248 m (814 ft)	Cable-stayed; Composite steel/concrete deck, 1 concrete pylon 120+70	Road bridge Sông Lạch Tray	2012	Haiphong; 20°49′10.5″N 106°41′40.4″E	Red River Delta	
45	Bến Thủy 2 Bridge	Cầu Bến Thủy 2	120 m (390 ft)	996 m (3,268 ft)	Box girder Prestressed concrete 72+120+72	National Route 1 Cả River	2012	Vinh; 18°38′19.7″N 105°42′21.8″E	North Central Coast	
46	Đông Trù Bridge	Cầu Đông Trù	120 m (390 ft)	1,139 m (3,737 ft)	Arch; CFST tied-arches 80+120+80	Quốc lộ 5 kéo dài Đuống River	2014	Hanoi; 21°04′16.3″N 105°52′41.2″E	Red River Delta	
47	Cái Lớn Bridge	Cầu Cái Lớn	120 m (390 ft)	718 m (2,356 ft)	Box girder Prestressed concrete	National Route 63; Cái Lớn River	2014	Châu Thành district 9°51′16.3″N 105°07′11.6″E	Mekong Delta	
48	Cái Bé Bridge	Cầu Cái Bé	120 m (390 ft)	519 m (1,703 ft)	Box girder Prestressed concrete	National Route 63; Cái Bé River	2014	Châu Thành district 9°51′44.6″N 105°07′50.2″E	Mekong Delta	
49	Thái Hà Bridge	Cầu Thái Hà	120 m (390 ft)(x3)	2,159 m (7,083 ft)	Box girder Prestressed concrete	Road bridge Red River	2016	Chân Lý–Tiến Đức; 20°35′30.1″N 106°07′45.8″E	Red River Delta	
50	Bách Lẫm Bridge	Cầu Bách Lẫm	120 m (390 ft)	435 m (1,427 ft)	Extradosed; Concrete box girder deck, concrete pylons 75+120+75	Road bridge Red River	2018	Yên Bái; 21°42′27.6″N 104°53′28.6″E	Northeast	
51	Cổ Lũy Bridge	Cầu Cổ Lũy	120 m (390 ft)(x4)	1,877 m (6,158 ft)	Extradosed; Concrete box girder deck, 5 concrete pylons 75+4x120+75	Road bridge Trà Khúc River	2020	Quảng Ngãi; 15°08′33.5″N 108°53′06.8″E	South Central Coast	
52	Bản Xá Bridge	Cầu Bản Xá	120 m (390 ft)(x3)	670 m (2,200 ft)	Box girder Prestressed concrete 72+3x120+72	Road bridge Nam Na river		Mường Lay; 22°03′17.3″N 103°09′37.2″E	Northwest	
53	Bến Lức Bridge	Cầu Bến Lức	120 m (390 ft)(x2)		Box girder Prestressed concrete Twin bridges 90+120+90	North–South Expressway East; Vàm Cỏ Đông River		Bến Lức; 10°38′53.8″N 106°28′12.1″E	Mekong Delta	
54	Rào Bridge	Cầu Rào	115 m (377 ft)	456 m (1,496 ft)	Arch; Steel through arch	DT353; Sông Lạch Tray	2022	Haiphong; 20°49′40.9″N 106°41′57.5″E	Red River Delta	
55	Long Biên Bridge	Cầu Long Biên	106 m (348 ft)	1,682 m (5,518 ft)	Cantilever; Steel; Rail-road bridge 8x(106+75)	Road bridge Hanoi–Lào Cai railway Red River	1903	Hanoi; 21°02′40.0″N 105°51′41.1″E	Red River Delta	
56	Saigon Bridge	Cầu Sài Gòn	103 m (338 ft)	986 m (3,235 ft)	Beam; Steel; 82+103+82	National Route 52; Saigon River	1961	Ho Chi Minh City; 10°47′56.1″N 106°43′38.0″E	Southeast	
57	Phú Lương Bridge	Cầu Phú Lương	102 m (335 ft)	490 m (1,610 ft)	Box girder Prestressed concrete Twin bridges 65+2x102+65	National Route 5 Thái Bình River	1997	Hải Dương; 20°56′47.0″N 106°21′16.6″E	Red River Delta	
58	Saigon 2 Bridge	Cầu Sài Gòn 2	102 m (335 ft)	987 m (3,238 ft)	Box girder Prestressed concrete 82+102+82	National Route 52; Saigon River	2013	Ho Chi Minh City; 10°47′55.4″N 106°43′38.3″E	Southeast	
59	Ông Lớn Bridge	Cầu Ông Lớn	100 m (330 ft)	446 m (1,463 ft)	Arch; CFST tied-arch	Nguyễn Văn Linh	2004	Ho Chi Minh City; 10°43′42.1″N 106°41′24.8″E	Southeast	
60	Phù Đổng Bridge	Cầu Phù Đổng	100 m (330 ft)(x7)	946 m (3,104 ft)	Box girder Prestressed concrete Twin bridges 65+7x100+65	National Route 1 Đuống River	2012	Hanoi; 21°02′33.2″N 105°56′23.2″E	Red River Delta	
61	Bình Khánh Bridge (west bridge) under construction	Cầu Bình Khánh (cầu phía Tây)	100 m (330 ft)(x2)	12,104 m (39,711 ft)	Box girder Prestressed concrete 60+2x100+60	Ben Luc – Long Thanh Expressway; HCMC Ring Road 3	2023	Ho Chi Minh City; 10°39′49.4″N 106°43′36.7″E	Southeast	
62	Sông Hiếu Bridge	Cầu Sông Hiếu	100 m (330 ft)(x2)	210 m (690 ft)	Cable-stayed; Concrete deck, 1 concrete pylon 2x100	Road bridge Hieu River		Đông Hà; 16°49′48.4″N 107°05′17.7″E	North Central Coast	
63	Đá Bạc Bridge	Cầu Đá Bạc	100 m (330 ft)(x2)		Box girder Prestressed concrete 65+100+65	National Route 10; Bạch Đằng River		Haiphong; 21°00′19.7″N 106°41′10.1″E	Red River Delta	

== See also ==
- Cầu khỉ ("monkey bridge")
- Transport in Vietnam
- Rail transport in Vietnam
- List of railway lines in Vietnam
- Expressways of Vietnam
- Geography of Vietnam
- List of rivers of Vietnam
- List of crossings of the Mekong River
- vi:Danh sách cầu dài nhất Việt Nam (in Vietnamese) - List of longest bridges in Vietnam

== Notes and references ==
- Notes
- "Dự án Cầu - Đường bộ Việt Nam (list of bridges in Viet Nam)". tracuuxaydung.com (in Vietnamese). Archived from the original on 2010-02-27.
- Nicolas Janberg. "International Database for Civil and Structural Engineering". Structurae.com.
- Others references
