= List of tallest bridges in Vietnam =

This is a list of tallest bridges in the nation of Vietnam. The tallest bridge is the Cần Thơ Bridge over the Bassac River, at 175 meters tall.

== List ==
Class	Bridge	Image	Height (m)	Complete	To cross	Location	Note
1	Cần Thơ Bridge		175	2010	Hậu River	Cần Thơ - Vĩnh Long	The highest cable-stayed bridge Vietnam.
2	Phú Mỹ Bridge	thế=	162,5	2009	Saigon River	Ho Chi Minh City	The largest cable-stayed bridge Ho Chi Minh City. One of the most modern bridges in the world.
3	Vàm Cống Bridge	thế=	150	2018	Hậu River	Cần Thơ - Đồng Tháp	
4	Trần Thị Lý Bridge	thế=	145	2013	Hàn River	Đà Nẵng	
5	Bãi Cháy Bridge	thế=	137,5	2006	Cửa Lục Bay	Quảng Ninh	
6	Cao Lãnh Bridge	thế=	123	2018	Tiền River	Đồng Tháp	
7	Rạch Miễu Bridge	thế=|150x150px	117	2009	Tiền River	Tiền Giang - Bến Tre	
8	Mỹ Thuận Bridge	thế=	116,5	2000	Tiền River	Tiền Giang - Vĩnh Long	
9	Ba Son Bridge		113	2022	Saigon River	Ho Chi Minh City	
10	Nhật Tân Bridge	thế=	110	2015	Sông Hồng	Hanoi	The largest cable-stayed bridge Vietnam.
11	Bính Bridge	thế=	101,6	2005	Cấm River	Haiphong	
12	Bạch Đằng Bridge		100	2018	Thái Bình River	Hải Phòng - Quảng Ninh	
13	Kiền bridge	thế=	100	2003	Sông Cấm	Haiphong	
14	Pá Uôn Bridge	thế=	99	2010	Đà River	Sơn La	The bridge has the highest pier Vietnam.
15	Nhật Lệ 2 Bridge		97,5	2017	Nhật Lệ River	Quảng Bình	
16	Thuận Phước Bridge	thế=	92	2009	Hàn River	Đà Nẵng	The highest suspension bridge in Vietnam
17	Móng Sến Bridge		83	2021	Cầu cạn	Lào Cai	The viaduct has the highest pillars in Vietnam
18	Song Hiếu Bridge		74	2022	Sông Hiếu	Quảng Trị	
