= Cao Lãnh (disambiguation) =

- Cao Lãnh, Đồng Tháp is a ward in Đồng Tháp province

Cao Lãnh may also refer to:

- Cao Lãnh (city) is a former provincial city and capital city of Đồng Tháp province.
- Cao Lãnh district, former district in Đồng Tháp province

== Construction traffic ==
- Cao Lãnh Bridge: a cable-stayed bridge over the Tiền River
