= Vàm Cống =

Vietnamese ferry terminal

Vàm Cống ferry terminal is a ferry terminal in Vietnam located on Highway 80, connecting the two provinces of Đồng Tháp and An Giang. The ferry runs from Lấp Vò to Long Xuyên. The hamlet is notable as the site of the new part-Australian-funded Vàm Cống Bridge which will replace the ferry.
