= Ben Thuy Bridge 1 =

Vietnamese bridge

Ben Thuy Bridge 1 Cầu Bến Thủy
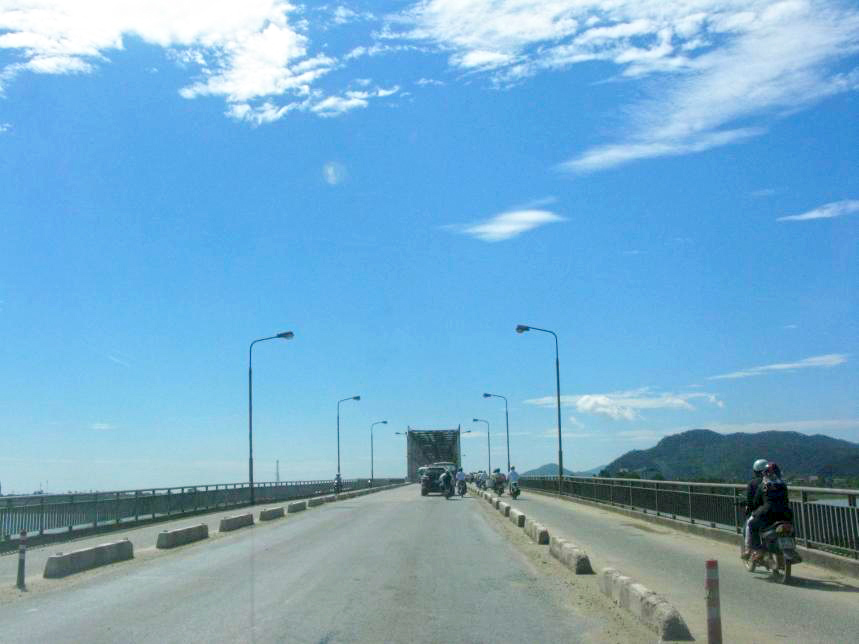
- Coordinates: 18°38′47″N 105°42′30″E
- Carries: Vehicles
- Crosses: Cả River
- Locale: Nghe An Province; Ha Tinh Province; National Route 1

Characteristics
- Design: box girder
- Material: Prestressed concrete, Reinforced Concrete

History
- Opened: 1986
- Inaugurated: 1990

Ben Thuy Bridge 1 (Vietnamese: Cầu Bến Thủy) is a road bridge in the North Central Coast of Vietnam and is part of the National Route 1

== Description ==
Ben Thuy Bridge 1 (sometimes referred to as just "Ben Thuy Bridge") is a box girder bridge that spans the Cả River connecting Nghe An Province and Ha Tinh Province in the Ben Thuy area. The bridge is 630.5 metres (2,069 ft) long with thirteen spans. The structure includes a prestressed reinforced concrete T beam for a leading span, a steel truss girder for the main spans, two simple beam 53 m (174 ft) spans, and three continuous girder spans.

== Construction ==
Before its construction, crossing the Ca river required travel by ferry or by pontoon bridges. For many years, there were only three ferries available, carrying both pedestrians and vehicles from the major arteries of the two provinces, resulting in frequent traffic jams. As part of an effort to improve infrastructure and economic conditions in the region, construction began in 1986 for what would be the first permanent bridge to cross the Ca River. Over 500 staff worked on the project, including many who would relocate and live in quarters on the construction site. In order to build the center of the bridge's span, steel fencing was built to drain the river from the construction site and P300 concrete was poured for the center pillars.

== Operation ==
In 1990, the bridge opened for traffic, making it the then-second longest bridge in Vietnam. From 2009 to 2010, a number of substantial motor accidents began to effect the structural integrity of the bridge. The subsequent unplanned closures for structural testing caused traffic jams reaching the thousands of vehicles, pointing to its key place in the country's transportation infrastructure. For three months of 2014, the Bridge was closed to traffic for its first major repair since its opening.

In 2010, it was announced that Ben Thuy Bridge 2 would be built to reduce the burden for the original bridge.
