= Kiền Bridge =

Vietnamese bridge

Kien Bridge Cầu Kiền
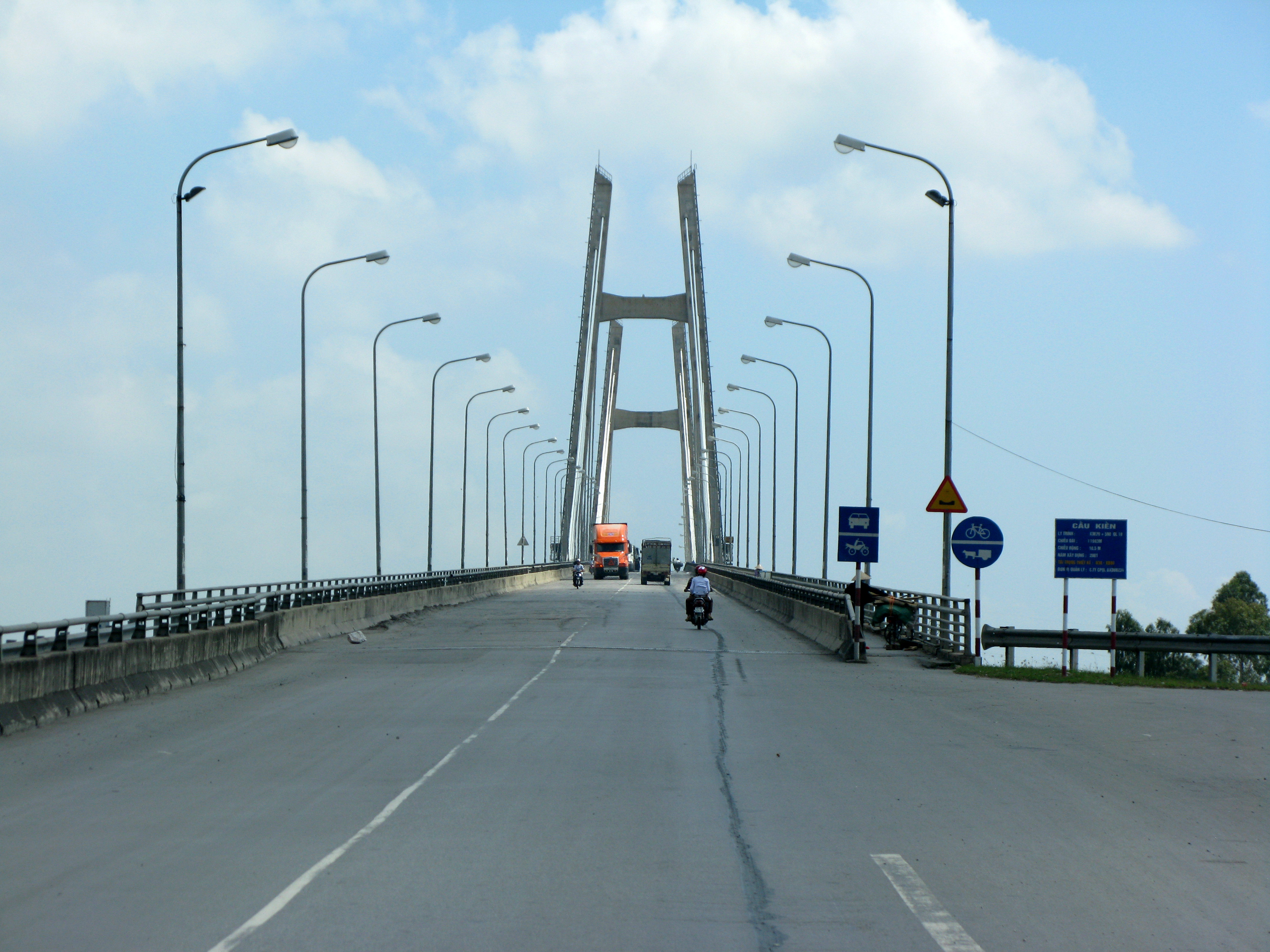
- Coordinates: 20°54′48.2″N 106°37′23.9″E
- Carries: Vehicles
- Crosses: Cấm River
- Locale: Haiphong, Red River Delta

Characteristics
- Design: Cable-stayed
- Material: Concrete box girder deck, concrete pylons
- Total length: 200 m (660 ft)

History
- Opened: 2007
- Inaugurated: 2010

Location
- Interactive map of Kien Bridge

Kien Bridge (Vietnamese:Cầu Kiền) is a road bridge spanning the Cấm River in Haiphong, Vietnam.

== Description ==
Kien Bridge is a cable-stayed bridge with a harp system. The length of the bridge is 1,186 m (3,891 ft), with its span 200 m (660 ft) long. It is a key link on Vietnam's National Route 10 by providing a path across the Cấm River in Haiphong, which ultimately helps travelers more easily navigate through the Red River Delta.

== Construction ==
Before the opening of the Kien Bridge, going between the river banks required travel by either boat or ferry. Construction began in 2001 as a joint venture between a Japanese and Vietnamese company. The building process required a diverse range of methods to address the complicated geology of the riverbed in the area. This included the installation of a nearly 100 m (330 ft) crane tower as well as using the cantilever method. During construction, the crane mounted 110 box girder blocks weighing 14,300 tons. As a cable-stayed bridge, construction required the tensioning of 375 tons of prestressed cable to make up the 36 pairs. Overall, it was estimated that the building of the Kien bridge required 5,000m³ of reinforced concrete and 6,910 tons of steel.

== Operation ==
The bridge's inauguration took place on September 28, 2003. The bridge connected Haiphong City of Quang Ninh Province with the Northeast and North Central regions of Vietnam, creating a road between the two communes An Hong and Kien Bai Haiphong. It quickly became a popular route as industrial development in the region led to a regular flow of tractor-trailers using the bridge. Its lack of maintenance gradually led to the degradation of the road's surface. In 2014, the news outlet Thanh Nien described the potholes as "a Matrix of Elephant Nests" and reported serious, sometimes fatal, traffic accidents occurring due to road's deterioration. There were further reports of warped railings and damaged expansion joints. In 2021, officials approved extensive repairs of the roads of National Highway 10, including the road between Da Bac Bridge and Kien Bridge.
