= Cấm River =

River in Vietnam

Coordinates: 20.8323°N 106.7923°E

The Cấm River (Vietnamese: Sông Cấm) is a river in northern Vietnam. It is one of the shorter distributaries of the Thái Bình River but geographically important as Haiphong, Vietnam's second largest port is located on the banks of this river.

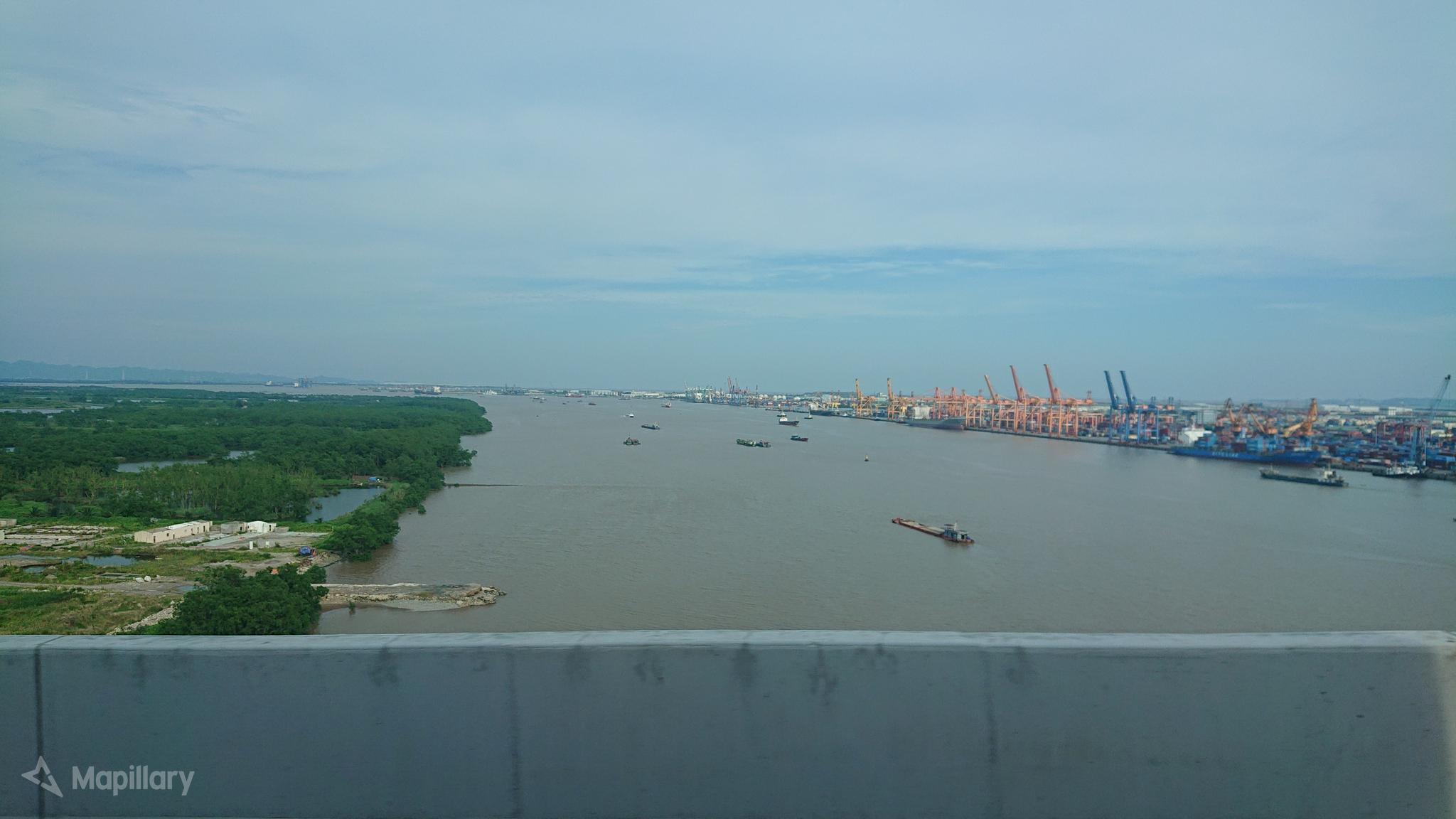
Port of Haiphong near the mouth of the river.

== Geography and hydrology ==
The start of the Cấm River is the confluence of the Kinh Môn River and a smaller stream, the Hàn, in Hải Dương province. From there it flows southeasterly, turning more easterly at Hai Phong before entering the Gulf of Tonkin as a wide estuary 5 kilometres (3.1 mi) further downstream.

The entire length of the river is 7 kilometres (4.3 mi).

The Cấm is subject to frequent silting, requiring regular dredging to accommodate ships that are greater than 5,000 tonnes (5,000,000 kg).
