= Đuống River =

Đuống River Thiên Đức River, Canal des Rapides
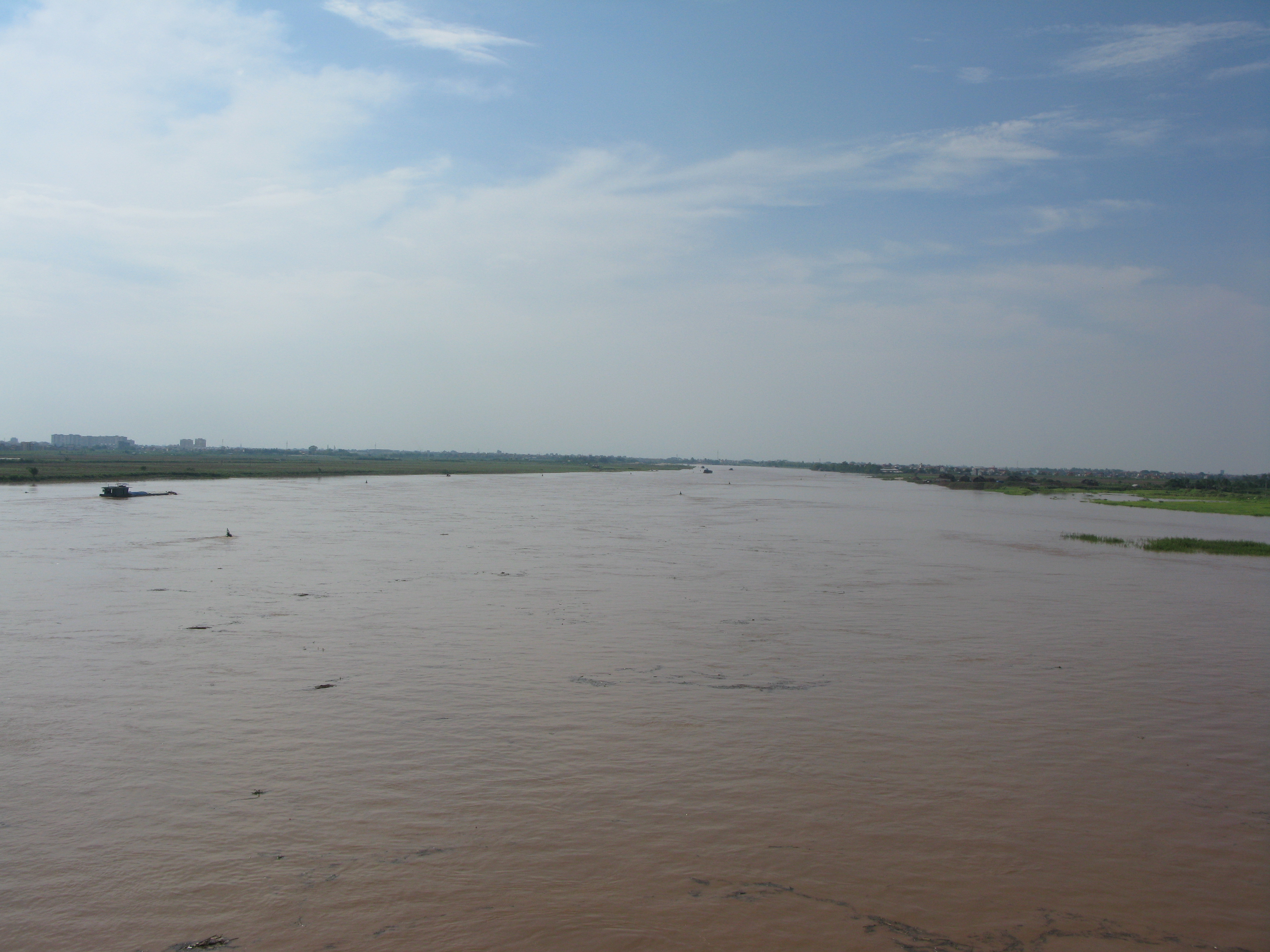
- Đuống River look from Phù Đổng Bridge 2008.
- Native name: Sông Đuống (Vietnamese)

Location
- Country: Vietnam
- Tỉnh, thành: Hà Nội, Bắc Ninh

Physical characteristics
- Source: Cửa Dâu Junction
  - location: Xuân Canh, Đông Anh District, Hanoi, Vietnam
  - coordinates: 21°4′51″N 105°50′41″E
- Mouth: Mỹ Lộc Junction
  - location: Trung Kênh, Lương Tài District, Bắc Ninh Province, Vietnam
  - coordinates: 21°3′21″N 106°18′16″E
- Length: 68 km (42 mi)
- Discharge
  - location: Thượng Cát
  - average: 880 m^{3}/s (31,000 cu ft/s)
  - maximum: 9,000 m^{3}/s (320,000 cu ft/s)

The Đuống River (Vietnamese: Sông Đuống, Vietnamese pronunciation: [ʂoŋ͡m ɗuə̌ŋ͡m]), also known as the Thiên Đức River, is a river of Vietnam. It flows for 68 kilometres (42 mi) through Bắc Ninh Province and Hanoi. It was previously known by the French as the Canal des Rapides.

The river features in the poem "On the Other Side of the Đuống River" by Hoàng Cầm.

== Gallery ==
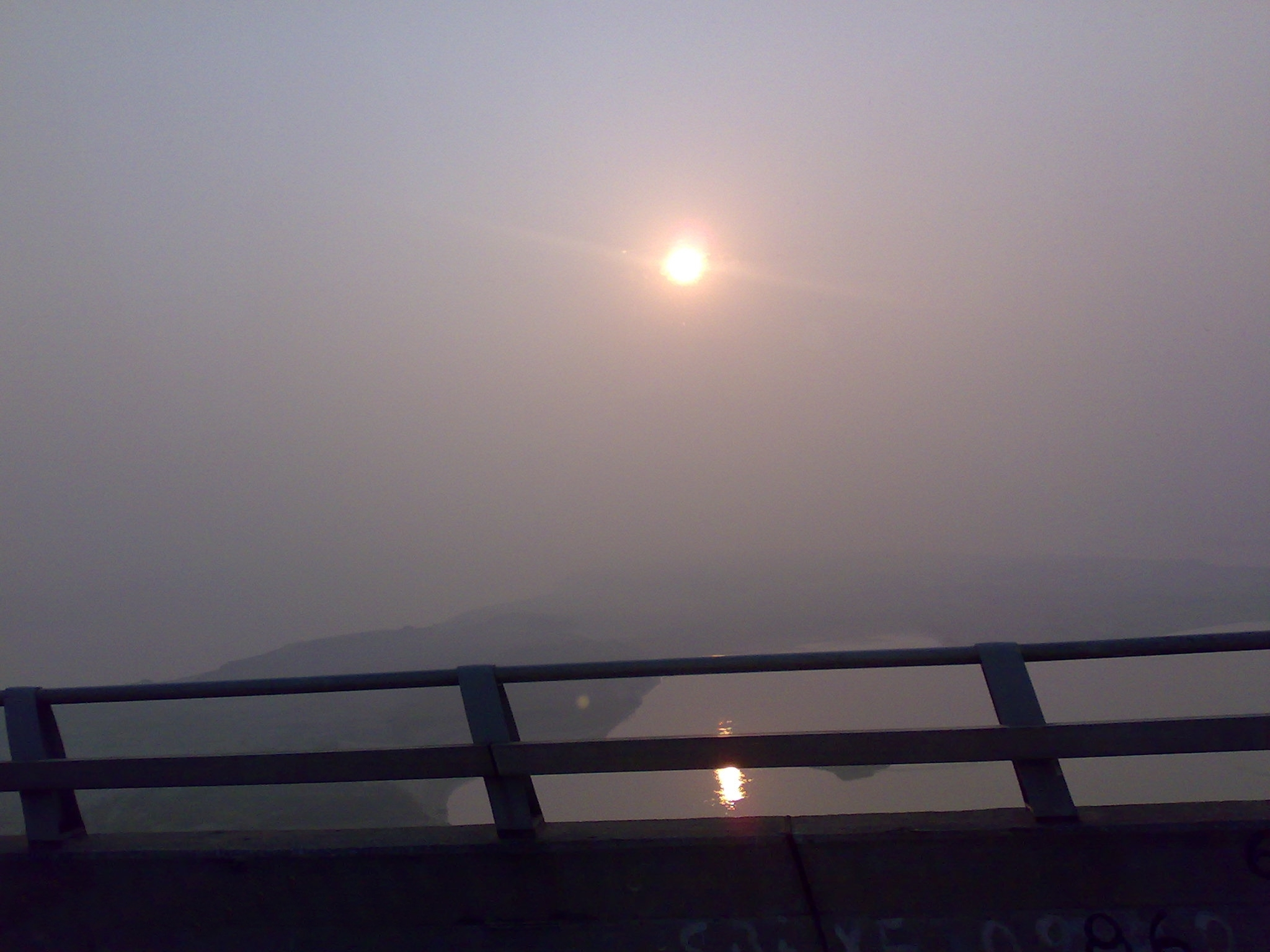
Sunrise on Đuống river

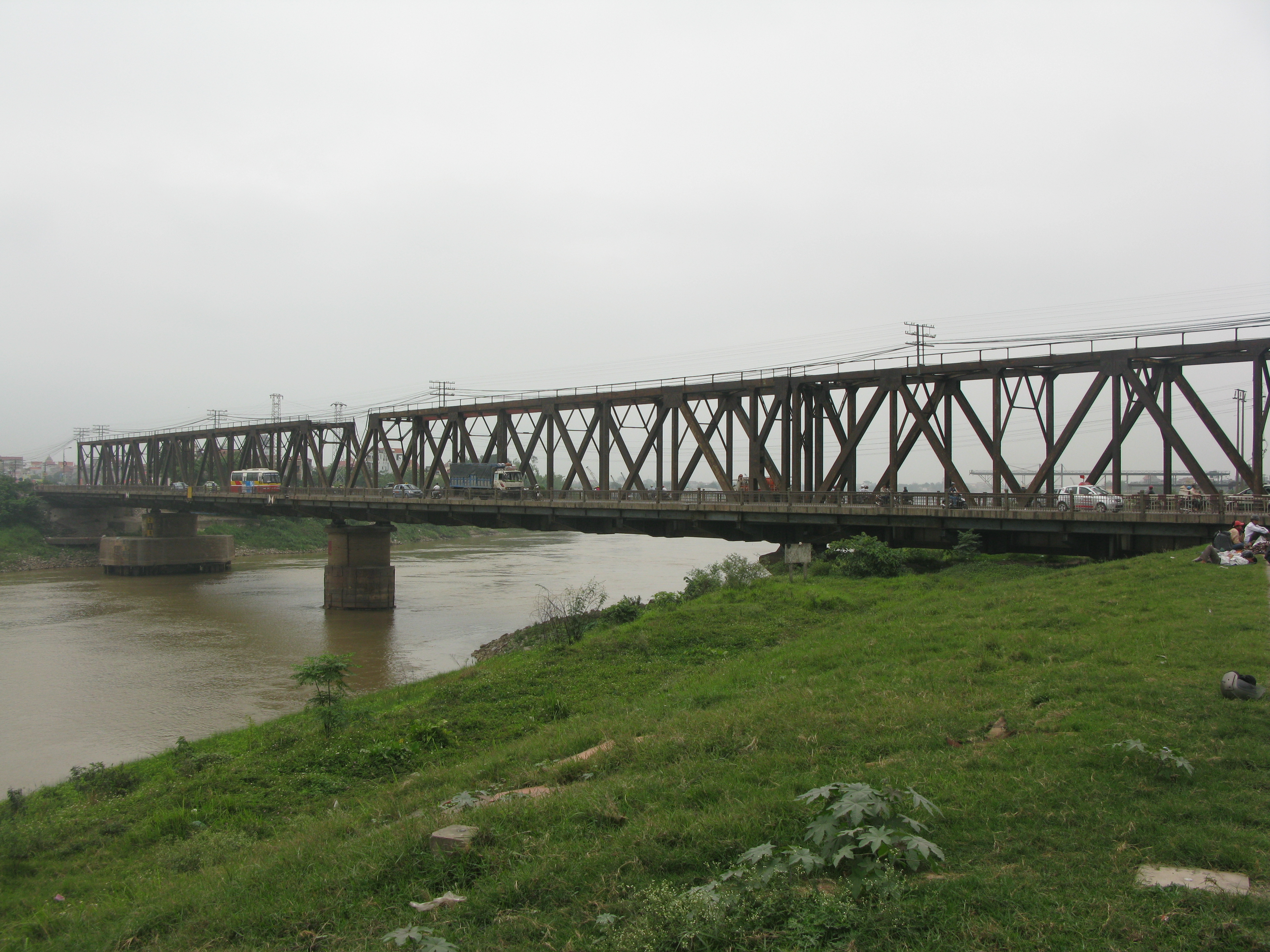
Đuống bridge

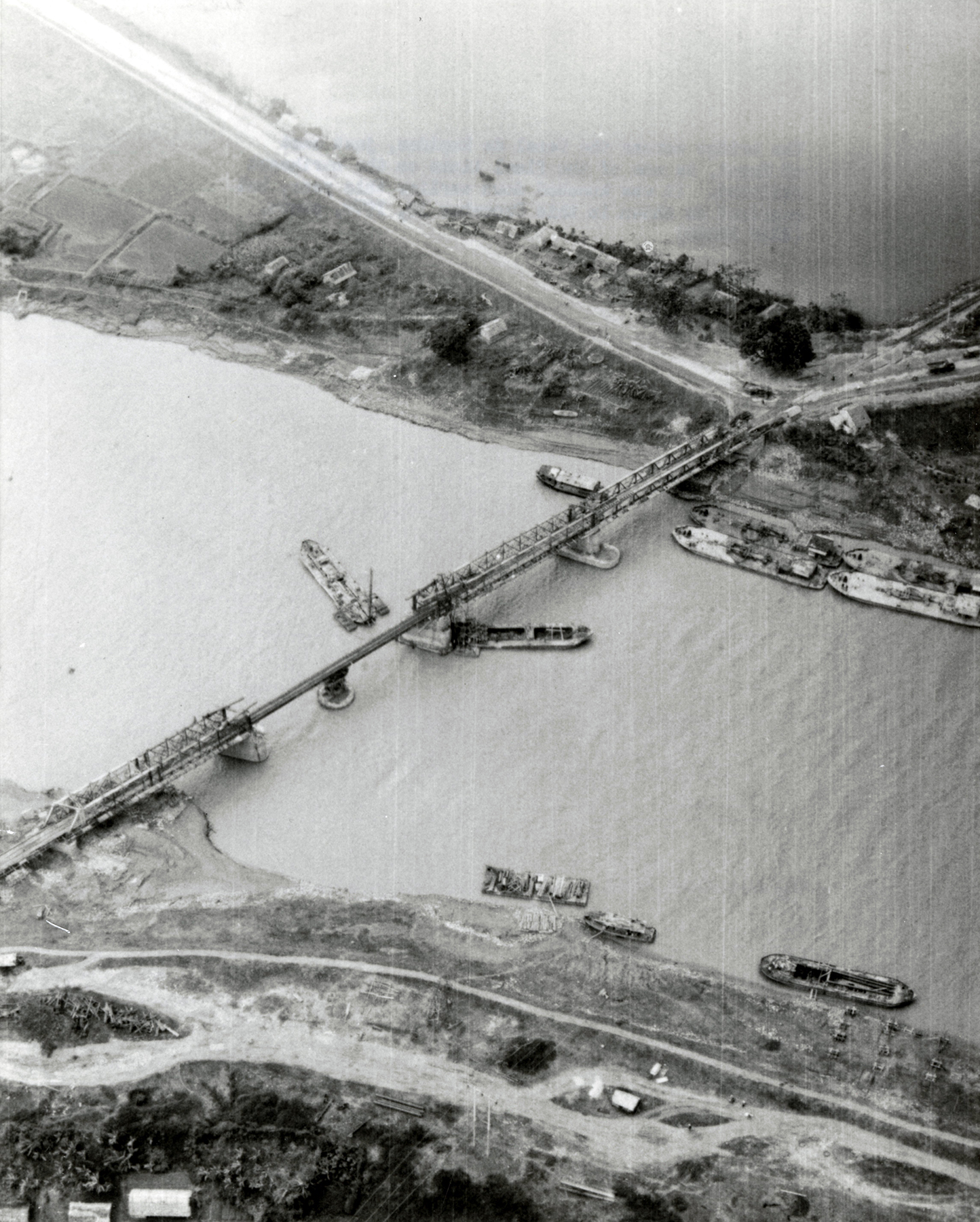
The Duong River Bridge being repaired after the Operation Linebacker in 1972
