= Golden Bridge (Vietnam) =

Pedestrian bridge near Da Nang, Vietnam

Golden Bridge Cầu Vàng
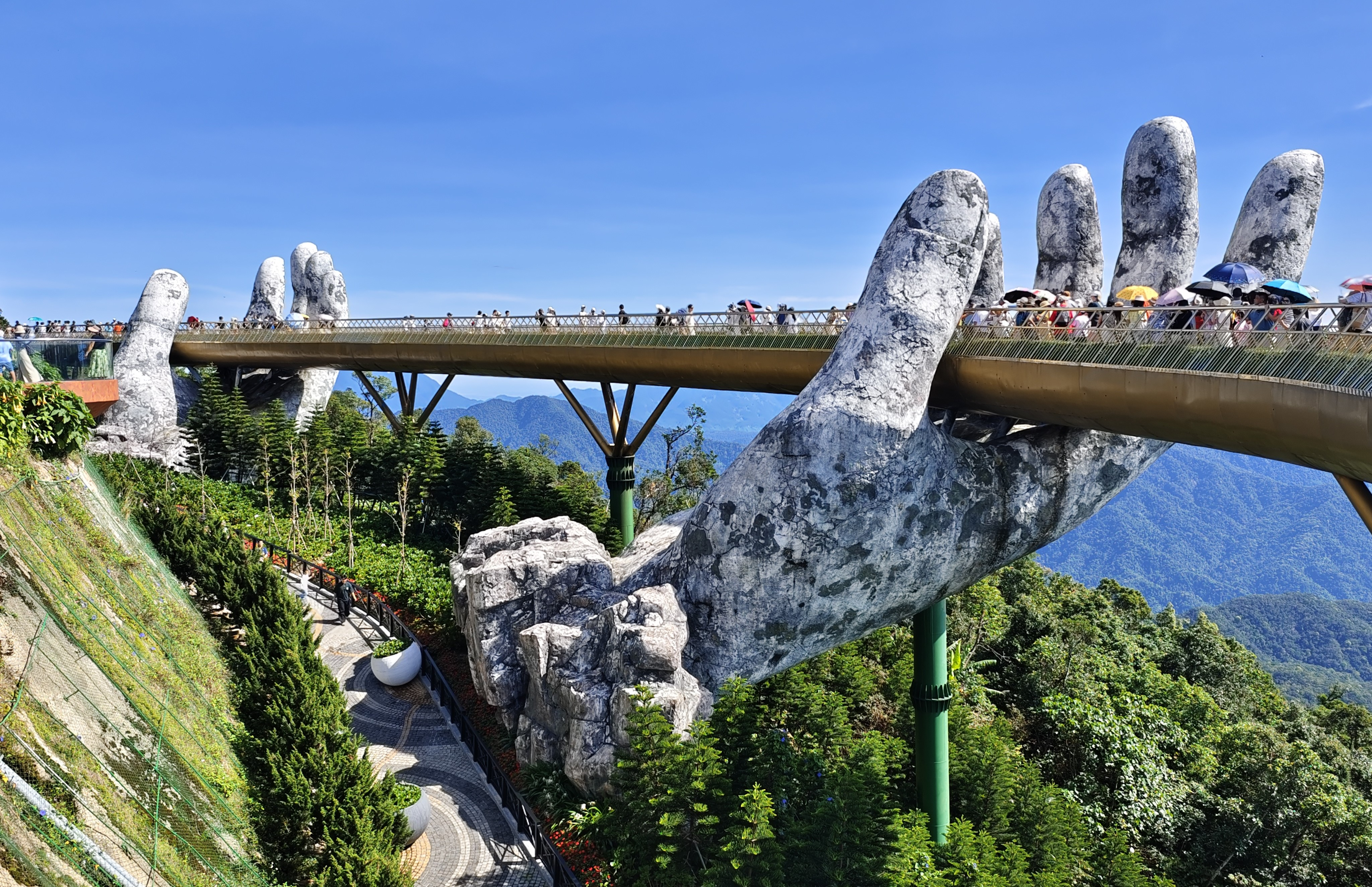
- Golden Bridge in 2025
- Coordinates: 15.99486°N 107.99625°E
- Carries: Pedestrians
- Crosses: Mountain road
- Locale: Bà Nà Hills, Hòa Vang district, Da Nang

Characteristics
- Material: Steel painted gold
- Total length: 150 m (490 ft)
- Width: 5 m (16 ft)

History
- Opened: June 2018; 8 years ago

Location
- Interactive map of Golden Bridge

The Golden Bridge (Vietnamese: Cầu Vàng) is a 150-metre-long (490 ft) pedestrian bridge in the Bà Nà Hills resort, in the Hòa Vang district of Da Nang, Vietnam. It is designed to connect the cable car station with the gardens (avoiding a steep incline) and to provide a scenic overlook and tourist attraction. The bridge loops nearly back around to itself and has two giant hands, constructed of fibreglass and wire mesh, designed to appear like stone hands that support the structure.

The client for the project was the Sun Group. The bridge was designed by TA Landscape Architecture (under Ho Chi Minh City University of Architecture), based in Ho Chi Minh City. The company's founder, Vu Viet Anh, was the project's principal designer, with Trần Quang Hùng as the bridge designer and Nguyen Quang Huu Tuan as design manager. Construction began in July 2017 and was completed in April 2018; the bridge opened in June 2018.
