= Cao Lãnh Bridge =

Bridge in Vietnam

Cao Lãnh Bridge Cãu Cao Lãnh
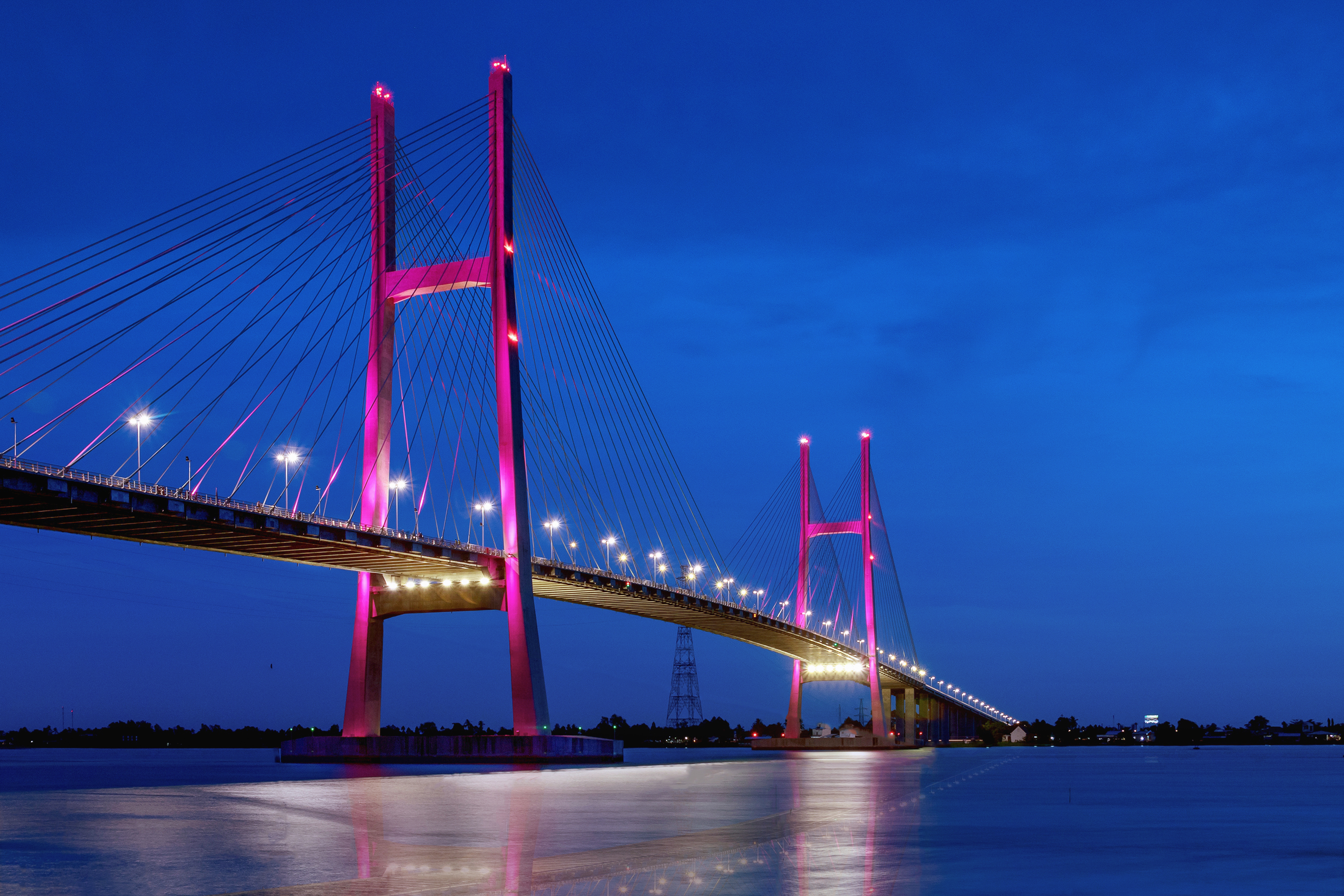
- Coordinates: 10°24′46″N 105°39′07″E
- Carries: Motor vehicles, pedestrians and cyclists
- Crosses: Tiền River, Mekong Delta, Vietnam
- Official name: Cao Lãnh Friendship Bridge

Characteristics
- Design: Cable-stayed bridge
- Total length: 2,010 metres (6,590 ft)
- Width: 24.5 metres (80 ft)
- Height: 120 metres (390 ft)
- Longest span: 350 metres (1,150 ft)
- No. of spans: 150 + 350 + 150 m (cable stayed parts)
- Clearance above: 37.5 metres (123 ft)
- Design life: 100

History
- Designer: Wilbur Smith Associates – WSP Finland – Yooshin Engineering Corporation Joint Venture
- Constructed by: Chinese Road and Bridge Corporation (CRBC) and the Vinaconex E&C
- Construction start: 2013
- Construction end: 2018
- Opened: 27 May 2018

Location
- Interactive map of Cao Lãnh Bridge

The Cao Lãnh Bridge is a cable-stayed bridge over the Tiền River, a branch of the Mekong River at Cao Lãnh in Vietnam. The bridge is one of three components of the planned Central Mekong Delta Connectivity Project (CMDCP). The other two components are the Vàm Cống Bridge at Vàm Cống and the 4 lane expressway connecting the two bridges. The Cao Lanh Bridge was inaugurated on 27 May 2018.

== Design ==
The cable-stayed bridge is 650 metres (2,130 ft) long with a central span of 350 metres (1,150 ft) and a maximum clearance above high water level of 37.5 metres (123 ft). The total length of the bridge, including the approach viaducts, is 2,010 metres (6,590 ft) with spans of 17 x 40 + (150+350+150) + 17x40 (m). It has H-shape towers 120 metres (390 ft) high, cast in situ concrete girder superstructure with a double-plane of cables in a semi-fan type configuration. It carries four lanes for traffic. The maximum speed on the bridge will be 80 km/h.

The objective of the Central Mekong Delta Connectivity Project is to encourage the economic and social development of the Cửu Long Delta area. The project was developed with the financial assistance from the Asian Development Bank (ADB) and the Government of Australia. It is jointly funded by the governments of Australia and Vietnam, and the ADB. The bridge was the largest overseas assistance project undertaken by the Australian government costing A$160 million.

== Construction ==
The groundbreaking ceremony for the Cao Lanh Bridge, was held on 19 October 2013 and attended by senior officials from the Vietnamese and Australian Governments and the Asian Development Bank (ADB). The bridge was expected to be completed after 43 months in mid-2017 but was delayed.

The opening of the bridge, held on 27 May 2018, was attended by Vietnam Deputy Prime Minister Trinh Dinh Dung, Australian Foreign Minister Julie Bishop, Vietnam Minister for Transport Nguyen Van The, ADB Country Director Eric Sidgwick and senior officials from ministries, cities and provinces.

== See also ==
- List of Bridges in Vietnam
