= Truong Tien Bridge =

Vietnamese bridge

Trường Tiền Bridge Cầu Trường Tiền
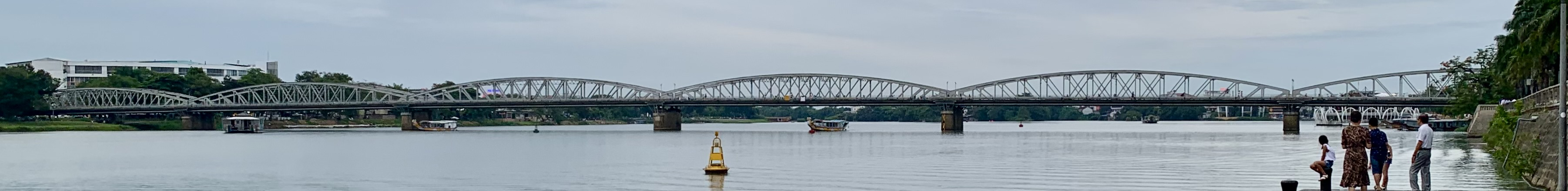
- Bridge in 2024
- Coordinates: 16°28′8″N 107°35′19″E
- Carries: pedestrians, vehicles
- Crosses: Perfume River
- Locale: Huế
- Other name(s): Tràng Tiền bridge, Thành Thái bridge, Mống bridge, Nguyễn Hoàng bridge, Clémenceau bridge

Characteristics
- Material: Steel
- Total length: 403 metres (1,322 feet)
- Height: 5.45 metres (17.9 feet)

History
- Opened: 1899
- Inaugurated: 1900

Location
- Interactive map of Trường Tiền Bridge

Trường Tiền Bridge (Vietnamese: Cầu Trường Tiền) is a bridge crossing the Perfume River in Huế, Vietnam

== Description ==
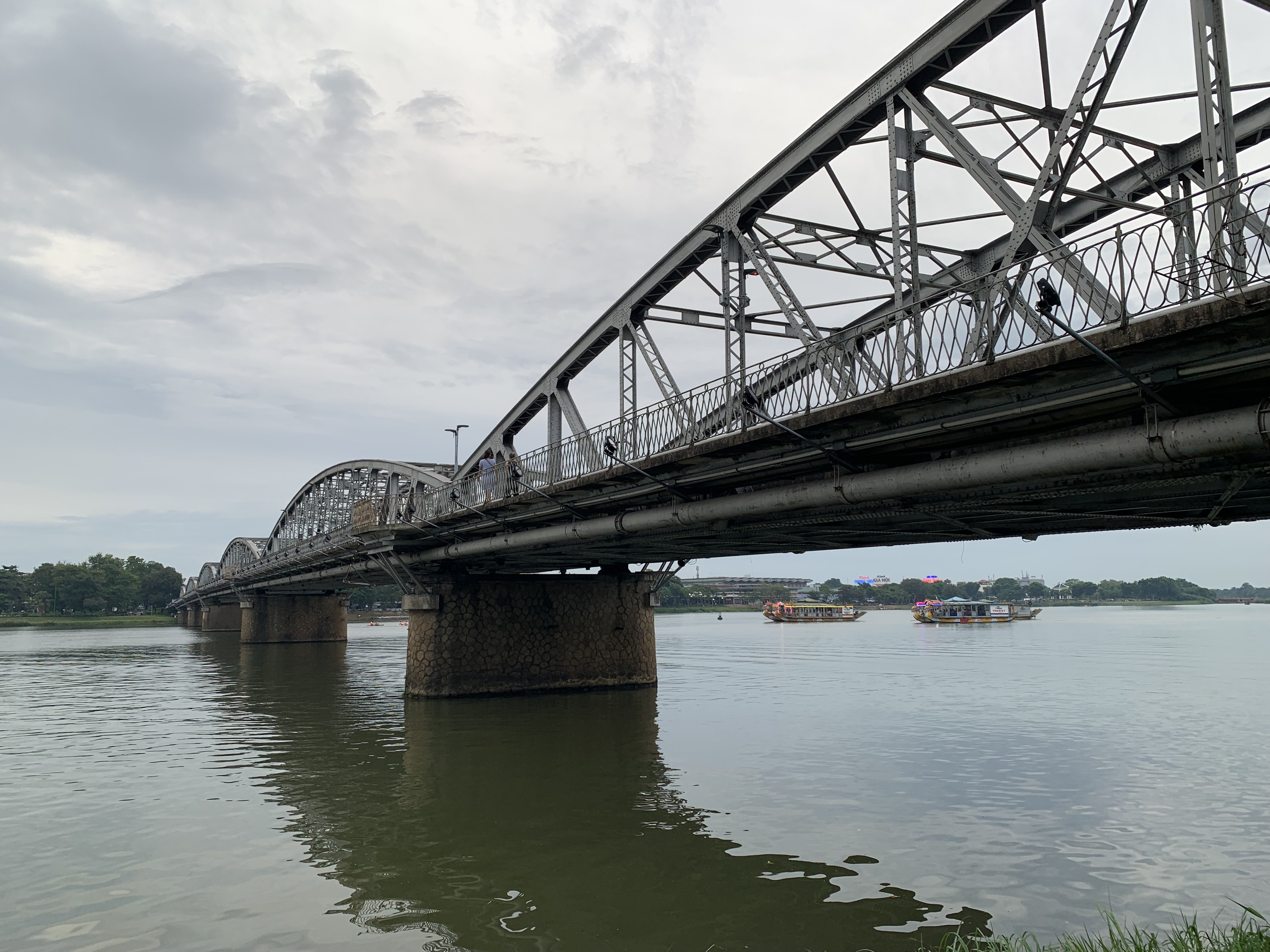
Truong Tien Bridge in 2024

The Truong Tien Bridge is 403 metres (1,322 feet) long gothic structure, with 6 arches of comb-shaped steel girders, each arch itself 67 metres (220 feet). The bridge's width is 6 metres (20 feet). Spanning over the Perfume River, the northern bridgehead is in Dong Ba ward with the southern bridgehead is in Phu Hoi ward in the city center of Hue city, Thua Thien Hue province, Vietnam.

== History ==
In 1897, French engineering company Schneider, Cie, and Letellier team was assigned by the French Resident Superior in Central Vietnam to design and build the bridge. The project was completed at an estimated cost of 732,456 Francs, with the groundbreaking ceremony taking place in May 1899 and the inauguration on December 18, 1900.

During the 1904 'Year of the Dragon' Flood ("Trận lụt năm Thìn"), the bridge sustained significant damage and would require significant repair. The bridge would be re-opened in 1906 with the road paved in concrete rather than the wooden planks from before.

In 1907, when Thành Thái was exiled by the French to Réunion Island, the French colonial government renamed the bridge "Clémenceau Bridge", after Georges Clemenceau, a French Prime Minister during World War I.

As the bridge degraded over time due to rust and increased traffic, the French colonial government negotiated with the Eiffel company (then-named Levallois Perret Construction Company;La Société Constructions Levallois-Perret) to replace the damaged iron beam frames, pave the deck with reinforced concrete bridge deck, widen the roadbed with two sidewalks for pedestrians to 1.95 metres (6.4 feet) wide, and treat the structure with anti-rust coating. The upgrade cost 435,000 francs.

On June 20, 1937, the Eiffel company (then named Anciens Etablissements Eiffel) led by engineer Martin André began construction on an expansion of the bridge. In November 1939, after 29 months of construction, the bridge expansion was completed.

The bridge endured decades of severe damage, catastrophic collapses, and temporary repairs until a long-term rebuilding effort took place from 1991 to 1995. Among the changes, the pedestrian balcony pathways were removed on both sides, the roads were narrowed to add two more railing pipes for bracing, and the paint color was changed to gray instead of the original silver. In 2002, colorful lights were permanently installed into the bridge for a festival.

== Gallery ==
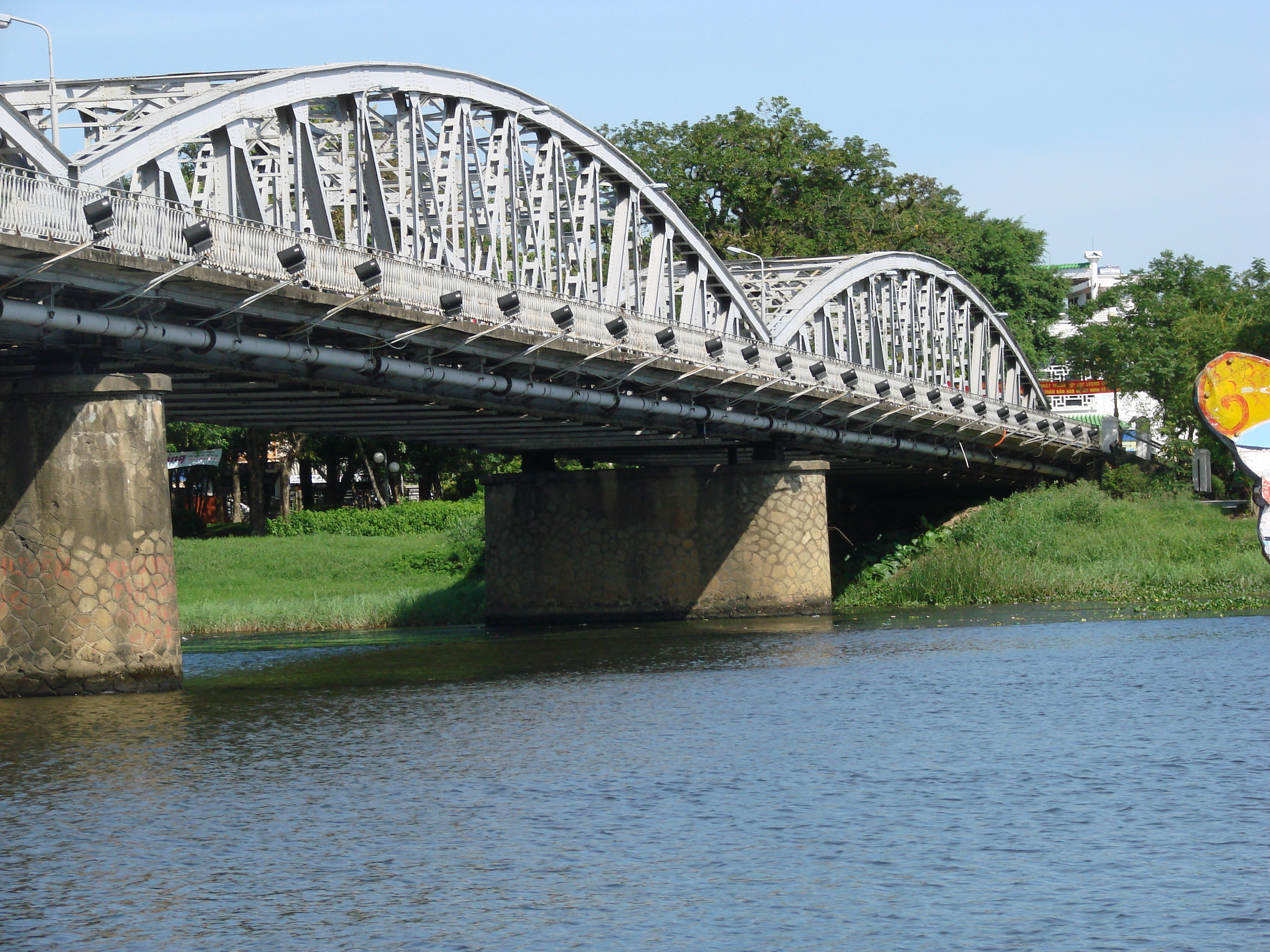
Arches of bridges

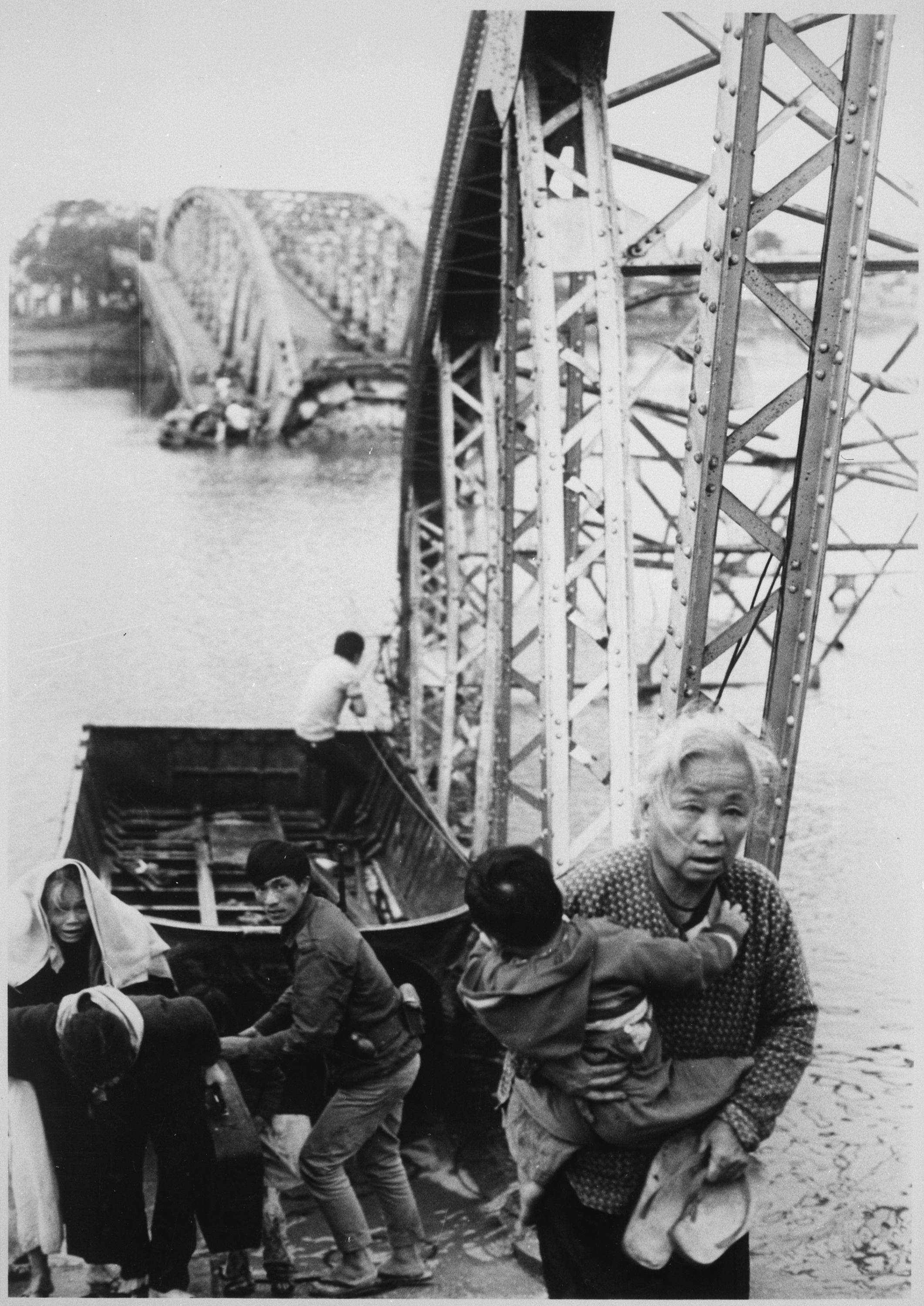
Bridge collapse during Military Conflict in 1968

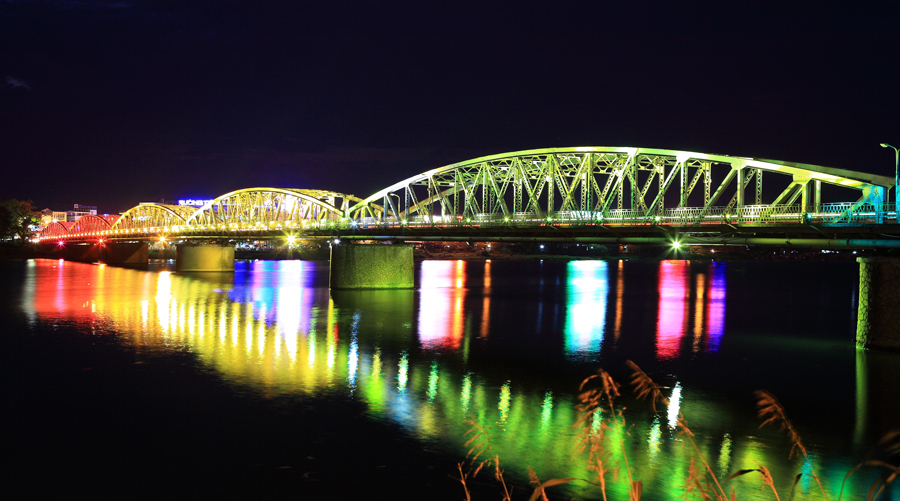
Bridge at night with lights

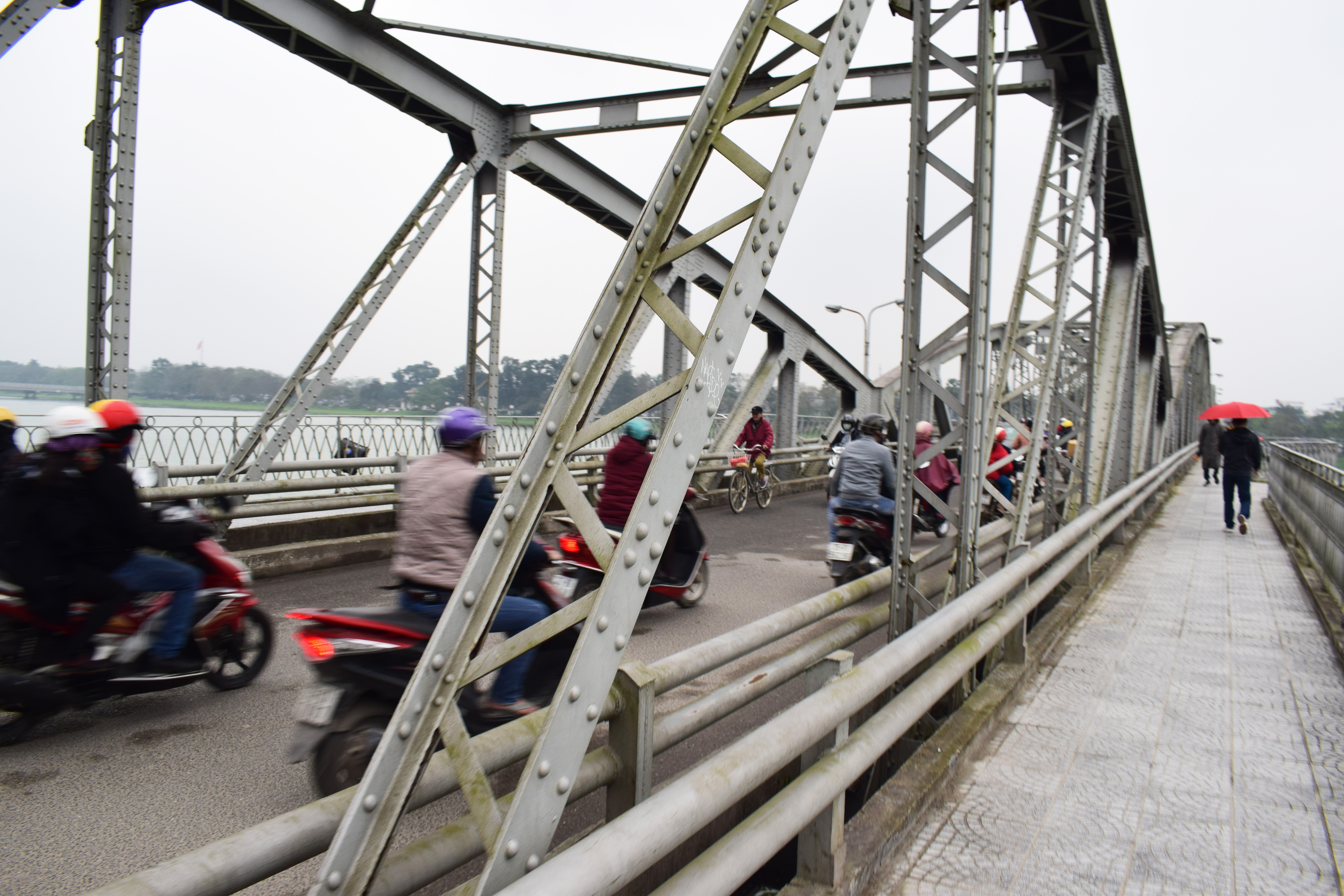
Roads and sidewalks of the bridge
