= Ben Thuy Bridge 2 =

Vietnamese bridge

Ben Thuy Bridge 2 Cầu Bến Thủy 2
- Coordinates: 18°38′19.7″N 105°42′21.8″E
- Carries: Vehicles
- Crosses: Cả River
- Locale: Nghe An Province; Ha Tinh Province National Route 1

Characteristics
- Design: box girder
- Material: Prestressed concrete, Reinforced Concrete
- Total length: 996 m (3,268 ft)
- Width: 25 m (82 ft)

History
- Opened: 2010
- Inaugurated: 2012

Ben Thuy Bridge 2 (Vietnamese: Cầu Bến Thủy 2) is a road bridge spanning the Cả River in the North Central Coast of Vietnam. It was built parallel to Ben Thuy Bridge 1 as a way to relief congestion, and similarly provides a connecting road between Nghe An Province and Ha Tinh Province.

== Description ==
Ben Thuy II Bridge is a box girder bridge connecting the two provinces of Nghe An and Ha Tinh, Vietnam. The bridge functions as part of a bypass route to the city of Vinh. It connects the town of Xuan An town of the Nghi Xuan district in Ha Tinh province with the commune of Hung Loi in the Hung Nguyen district of Nghe An province). It is about 800 m (2,600 ft) upstream of the original Ben Thuy Bridge.

It is 996 m (3,268 ft) long and 25 m (82 ft) wide. It was built with both reinforced concrete and prestressed reinforced concrete. It has four lanes of traffic with a designed speed of 80 km/h. It is engineered to withstand a level 8 earthquake.

== Construction ==
In 1990, the original Ben Thuy Bridge was open to traffic and quickly became a major link in the National Route 1. A number of accidents called into the question both the structural integrity of the original bridge and its ability to handle the ever-increasing traffic from Vietnam's bustling economic activity. In 2008, a 1.26 billion VND project budget was approved for the construction of a second Ben Thuy bridge. Construction was managed and completed by the Civil Engineering Construction Corporation No.4 (Cienco4) using the "Build-Operate-Transfer" model. By 2012, construction was complete and a groundbreaking ceremony was held on the bridge.

== Operation ==
In September 2012, the bridge was opened to traffic. In June 2014, staff installed a low-speed dynamic weighing system to work in conjunction with the toll stations. The system showed that from June 26 to July 5 of 2014, approximately 27,000 vehicles crossed the bridge and about 12,000 vehicles among those were overloaded vehicles. In 2017, complaints grew over rising tolls to cross the bridge with the resulting pressure culminating in a 50% reduction in fees.
