= Bà Nà Hills =

Resort in the Trường Sơn Mountains, Vietnam

Coordinates: 15°59′44″N 107°59′39″E

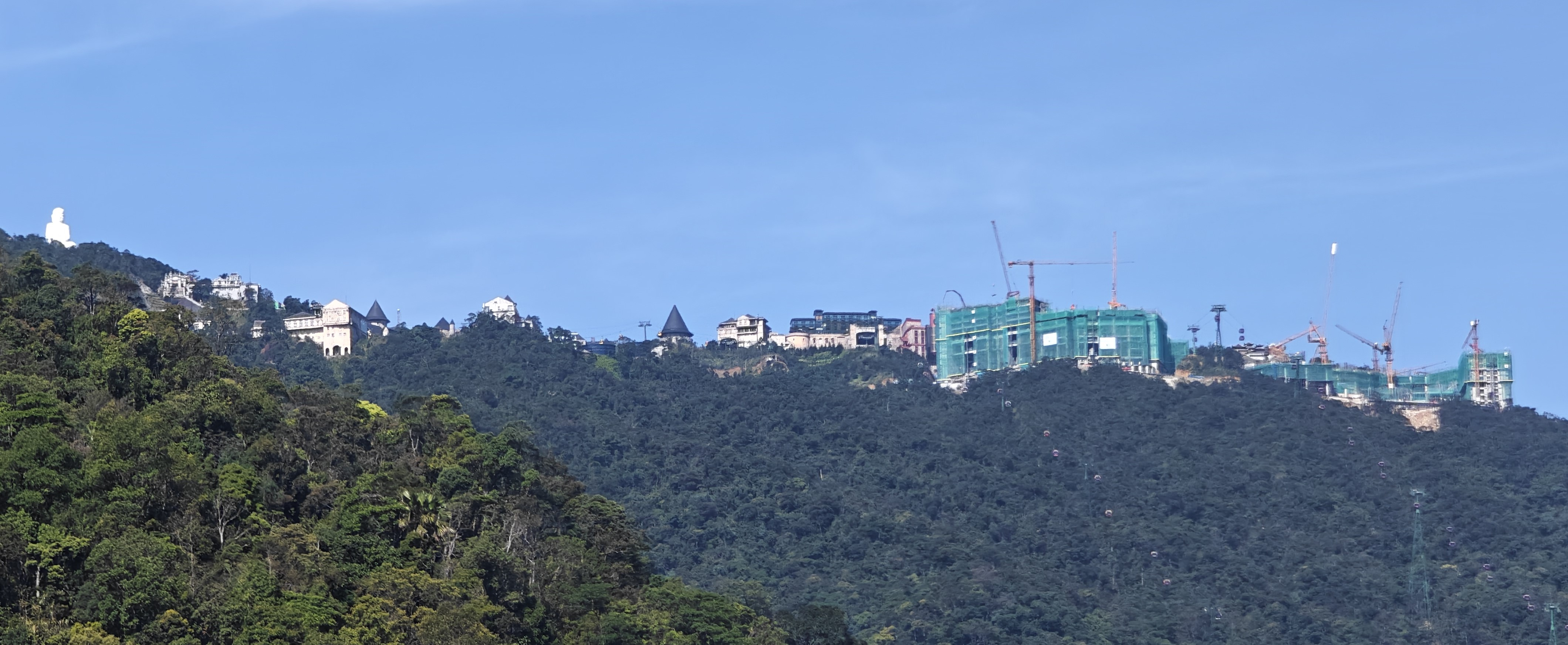
Ba Na Hills Resort in July 2025

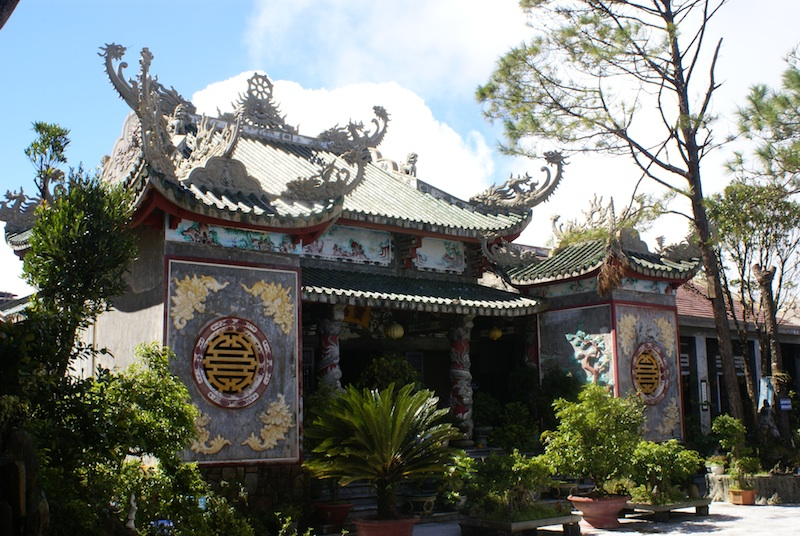
An old Vietnamese temple at the resort

Bà Nà Hill Station, Bà Nà Hills or Sun World Ba Na Hills is a hill station and resort located in the Trường Sơn Mountains, Hòa Vang district, west of the city of Da Nang, in South Central Coast of Vietnam.

== History ==
Its name Bà-nà or Pà-nà (old) in Kinh text originated from the Cham language, Po Inu Nagar. This area was the place to worship the most important goddess of the Champa tribes before the Islamic era of Vietnam.

The station, advertised as "the Da Lat of Danang province" by local tourism authorities, was founded in 1919 by French colonists and later expanded by Sun Group. Being located 1,500 metres above sea level, it has a view of the East Sea and the surrounding mountains.

Due to the elevation of the resort, the temperature is cooler than the environment near the coast. Linh Ứng Temple is situated near the station, with a cable car nearby to carry tourists to and from the resort.

== Cable Car ==
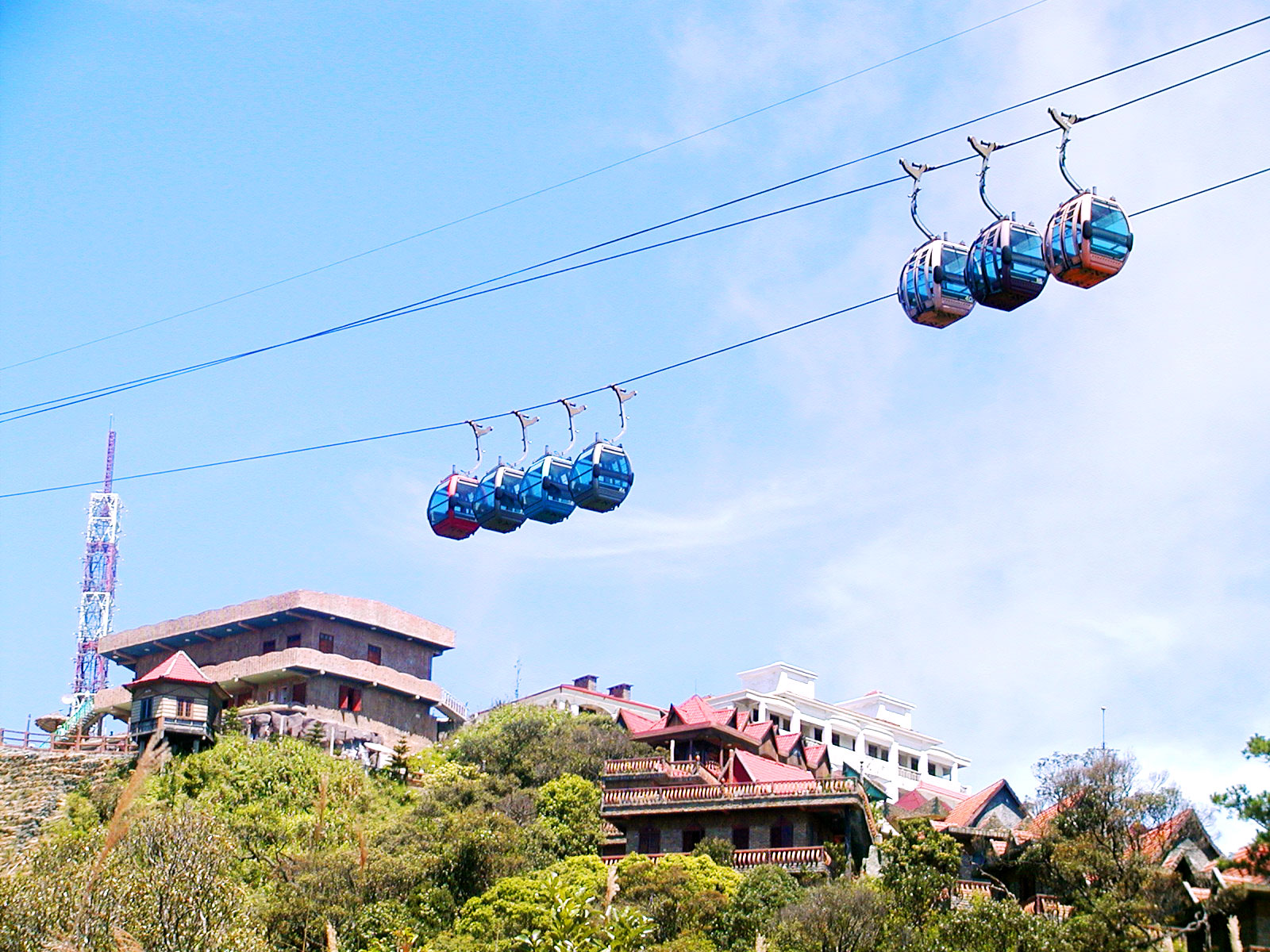
Ba Na resort cable cars

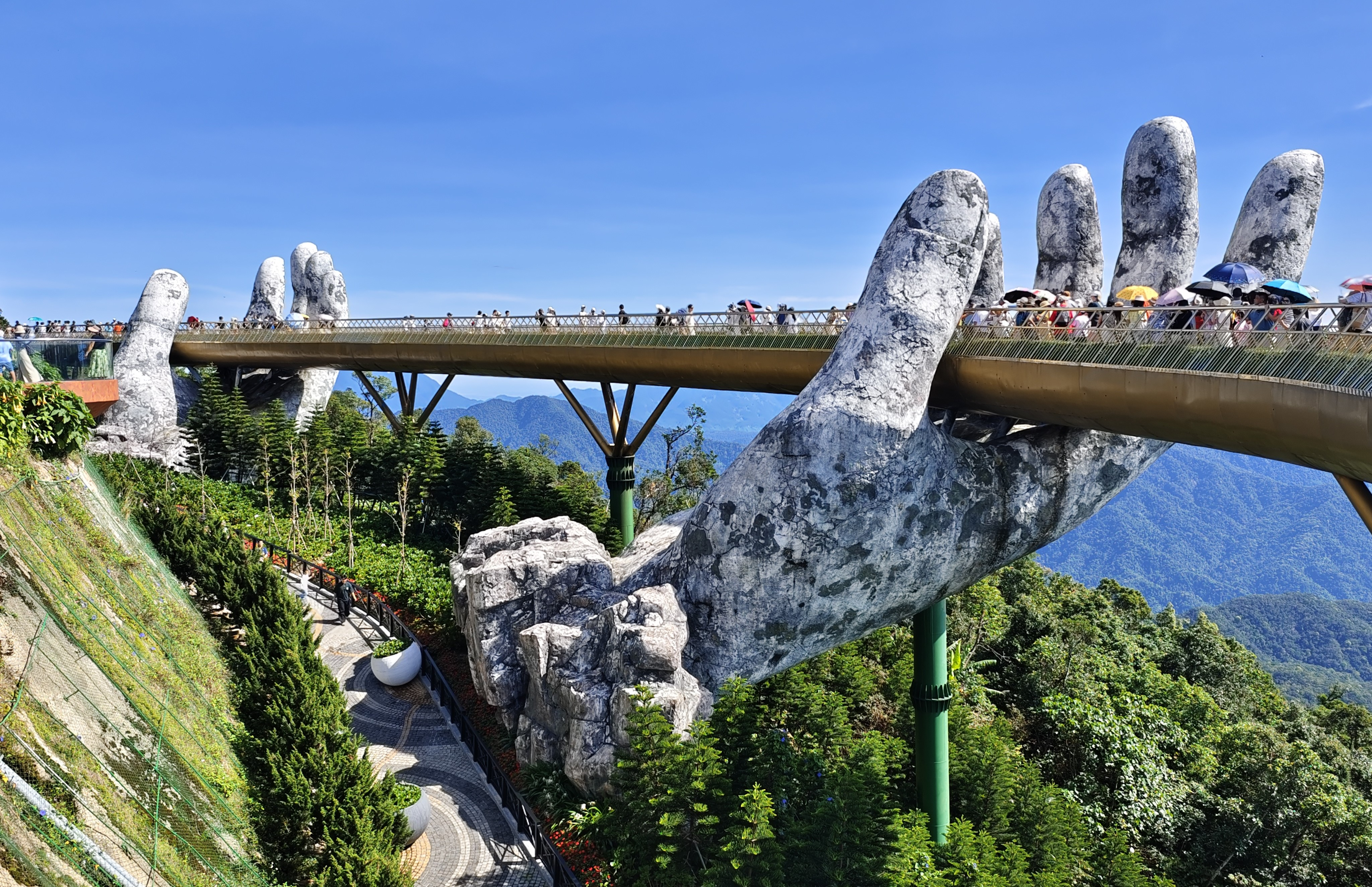
Golden Bridge at Ba Na Hills

The Ba Na Cable Car, opened on 29 March 2013, holds the world record for "longest non-stop single track cable car", at 5,801 metres (19,032 ft) in length. Its latest tourist attraction is the Golden Bridge (Cầu Vàng) pedestrian bridge.

The hill station is located at an elevation of 1,500 metres (4,900 ft), 42 kilometres (26 mi) from Da Nang.

In 2021, Ba Na Hills added their sixth cable car to the park, made by Doppelmayr and managed by Sun World, Sun Group.
