= Kinh Môn River =

River in Vietnam

The Kinh Môn River (Vietnamese: Sông Kinh Môn) is a river of Vietnam. It flows through Hải Dương Province and Hai Phong for 45 kilometres.
