= Mường Lay =

- Ward
- Country: Vietnam
- Province: Điện Biên

Area
  - Total: 29.09 km^{2} (11.23 sq mi)

Population (1999)
  - Total: 3,770
  - Density: 130/km^{2} (340/sq mi)
- Time zone: UTC+07:00 (Indochina Time)

Mường Lay is a ward (phường) of Điện Biên Province, northwestern Vietnam.

The Standing Committee of the National Assembly promulgated Resolution No. 1661/NQ-UBTVQH15 on the rearrangement of commune-level administrative units of Điện Biên Province in 2025 (the Resolution takes effect from 16 June 2025). Accordingly, Mường Lay Ward was established under Điện Biên Province on the basis of the entire 22.88 km² of natural area and a population of 5,139 from Na Lay Ward; the entire 29.33 km² of natural area and a population of 960 from Sông Đà Ward; the entire 60.46 km² of natural area and a population of 5,535 from Lay Nưa Commune of Mường Lay Town; and the entire 110.00 km² of natural area and a population of 6,574 from Sá Tổng Commune of Mường Chà District.
