= Pa Uon Bridge =

Vietnamese bridge

Pá Uôn Bridge Cầu Pá Uôn
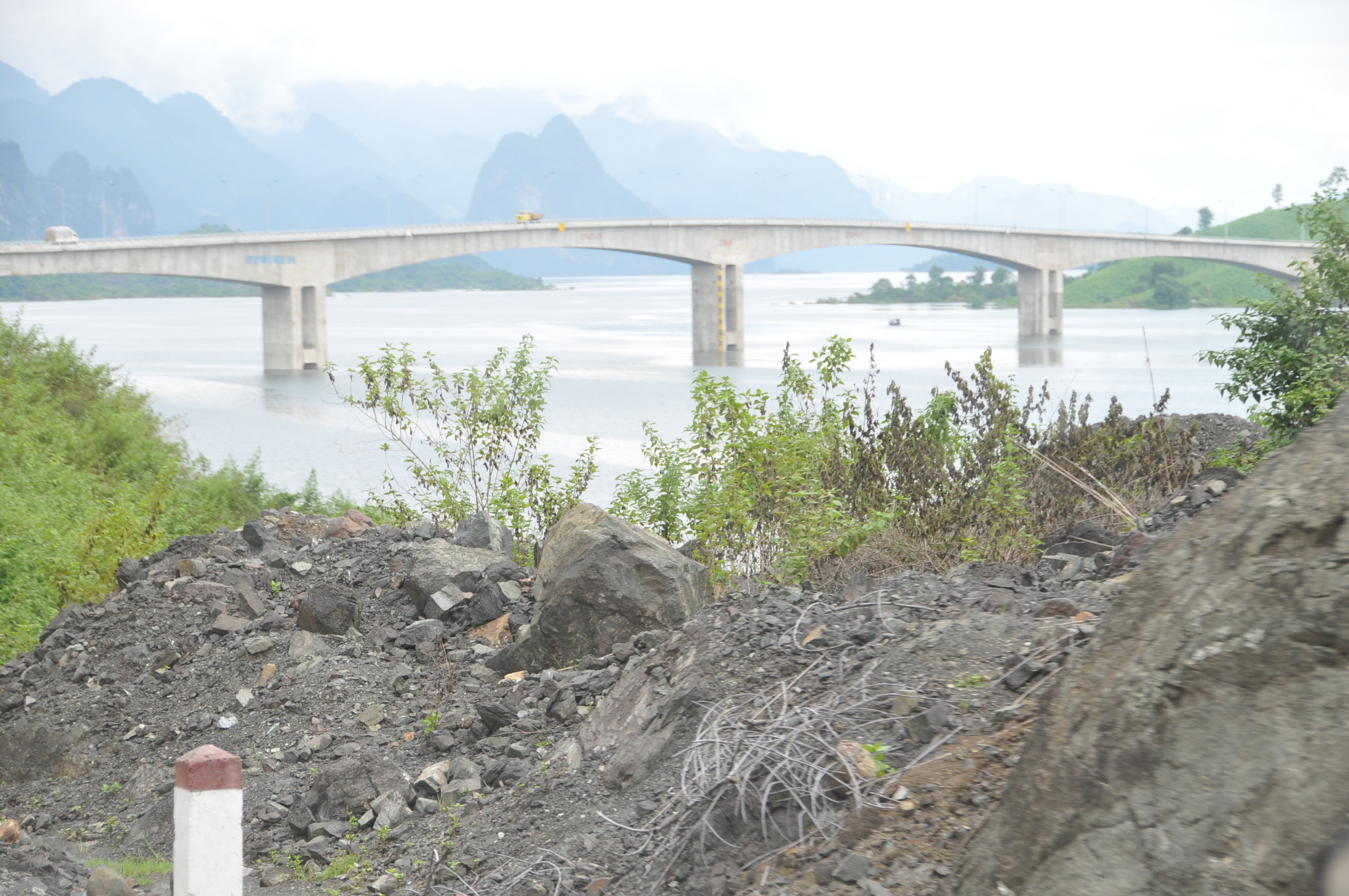
- Coordinates: 21°41′39″N 103°36′58″E
- Carries: Vehicles
- Crosses: Black River
- Locale: Son La Province

Characteristics
- Design: box girder
- Material: Prestressed concrete, Reinforced Concrete
- Total length: 918 metres (3,012 ft)
- Width: 9 metres (30 ft)

History
- Opened: 2007
- Inaugurated: 2010

Location
- Interactive map of Pá Uôn Bridge

Pa Uon Bridge (Vietnamese: Cầu Pá Uôn) is a road bridge spanning the Black River in the Son La Province of Vietnam.

== Description ==
The Pa Uon Bridge is located along Highway 279, approximately 70 kilometers from Sơn La upstream of the Black River. The box girder bridge is 918 metres (3,012 ft) long and 9 metres (30 ft) wide. The structure consists one single beam, two abutments, and eleven pillars made of prestressed reinforced concrete. On both sides of the bridge are simple guide spans that are 39 metres (128 ft) long. On the entire bridge, there are 11 pillars, two of which are nearly 100 meters high, a record within Vietnam (excluding suspension bridges). As there frequent and large earthquakes in the region, the bridge is constructed to withstand an earthquake of up to 9.0 on the Richter magnitude scale, including the main pillars (T7 and T8) which are two parallel branches with two-meter thick reinforced, horizontally braced concrete walls. The height from the river bottom to the bridge's deck is 103.8 metres (341 ft).

== History ==
Previous to the bridge's construction, reaching Quynh Nhai District and the nearby Thai villages required riding the Uon Pa ferry. Although the ferry at Chieng On commune started out as a small boat, a ferry terminal was built and expanded after the turn of the century. In 2005, the building of the Sơn La Dam would both initiate the re-location of nine of the Quynh Nhai District's thirteen communes as well as an increase in traffic at the crossing.

=== Construction ===
After deliberations on design, construction on the project started on May 28, 2007. The total project cost approximately 740 billion VND. On April 18, 2010, the final link was put into the bridge.

=== Operation ===
In August 2010, the bridge opened to traffic. In February 2015, the bridge was recognized in the Vietnamese record books as the "bridge with the tallest pier" in the country. An annual boat racing festival is held under the Pa Uon Bridge with eight teams and over 200 rowers participating in 2015. In December 2012, the Son La Hydropower Plant was also opened for operation, making the bridge a key route to and from the largest hydroelectric project in Southeast Asia. Although the bridge has made its predecessor ferries near obsolete, some writers express nostalgia for the vessels and the role they played in sustaining communities in the past.
