= Cần Thơ Bridge =

Cần Thơ Bridge Cầu Cần Thơ
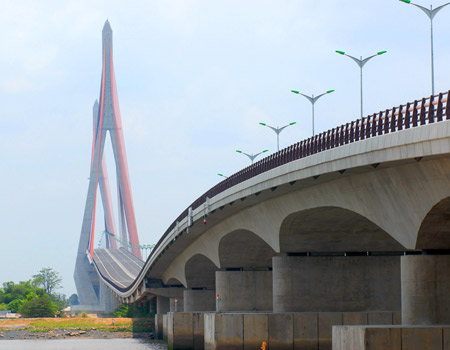
- Coordinates: 10°1′53.95″N 105°48′31.1″E
- Crosses: Sông Hậu (Bassac River)
- Locale: Cần Thơ and Vĩnh Long, Vietnam

Characteristics
- Design: Cable-stayed bridge
- Total length: 2,750 metres (9,022 ft), 15,850 metres (52,001 ft) include approach ramps
- Width: 23.1 metres (76 ft)
- Height: 175.3 metres (575 ft)
- Longest span: 550 metres (1,804 ft)
- Clearance above: 39 metres (128 ft)

History
- Construction start: September 25, 2004
- Opened: April 24, 2010

Location
- Interactive map of Cần Thơ Bridge

Cần Thơ Bridge (Vietnamese: Cầu Cần Thơ), is a cable-stayed bridge over the Hậu (Bassac) River, the largest distributary of the Mekong River, in the city of Cần Thơ in southern Vietnam. The bridge is 2.75 kilometres long (1.68 miles). It has a 6-lane carriageway measuring 23 metres (76 feet) in width, with 4 lanes for automobile traffic and two lanes for bicycles and motorbikes. It has a clearance of 39 metres (128 feet), which allows large ships to pass underneath it. The bridge was inaugurated on April 24, 2010.

== Construction ==
Prime Minister Phan Văn Khải launched construction of the bridge on September 25, 2004, which was scheduled to be completed in late 2008. The collapse of the partially built bridge in 2007 delayed its opening. The bridge is one of seventeen bridges planned to integrate the Mekong Delta into the road network of Vietnam by 2020. The bridge replaced the network of ferries on the National Route 1 linking Vĩnh Long Province on the east shore with Cần Thơ city on the westbank.

The construction of the bridge was supervised by the consultant group Nippon Koei-Chodai and contracted to several Japanese contractors: Taisei Corporation, Kajima Construction and Nippon Steel. Capital for the project was funded by the Japan International Cooperation Agency with official development assistance loan from the Japan Bank of International Cooperation and the Vietnamese government. Cần Thơ Bridge is insured by the Petrolimex Joint Stock Insurance Company and PetroVietnam Insurance Company for 3.2 trillion Vietnamese đồng (200 million U.S. dollars).

The construction of the Cần Thơ Bridge was subdivided into three contracts, with one contractor handling the first approach bridge, the second building the main bridge, and the third constructing the southern approach road into Cần Thơ.

== Collapse ==
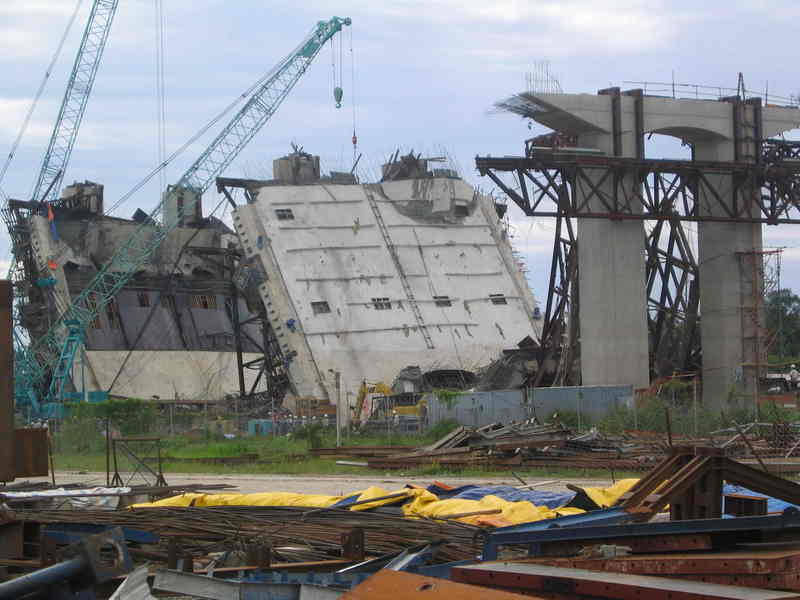
Pieces of Cần Thơ Bridge remaining after its collapse on October 4, 2007, ten days after the accident.

A 90-meter approach ramp of the Cần Thơ Bridge collapsed during construction, on the morning of September 26, 2007, falling from 30 meters in the air. The collapsed section was above a small island located on the Vĩnh Long side of the bridge. There were 250 engineers and workers working on and under the span at the time; the official death toll is 54, with 80 severe injuries. According to Dr. Trần Chủng, head of the national construction QA/QC authority under the Ministry of Construction, this is the most catastrophic disaster in the history of Vietnam's construction industry.

=== Rescue efforts ===
Immediately following the accident, many workers at the site joined the rescue forces to take the injured out of the debris, and Chợ Rẫy Hospital in Ho Chi Minh City sent two professional rescue teams to the site. Local people, students, and cadres joined the rescue teams. International agencies contributed rescue personnel and funding. Rescue efforts were carried out with cranes rather than by direct rescue personnel because of the risk of collapse of the remaining part of the bridge.

=== Aftermath ===
An inquiry into the cause of the collapse spent 8 months investigating. Initially, it was discovered that the temporary pillars that had given out had been under-specified, using narrower margins to save costs. Ultimately, the proximate cause was determined to be building the temporary pillars partially on soft sand, which settled unevenly and caused the pillar to tilt. In 2009, the Vietnamese government banned the Taisei and Kajima Construction companies from operating in Vietnam for one year, blaming the two Japanese companies for failing to secure the bridge support.

== Opening ==
The largest bridge in the region, was completed on April 12 and opened for traffic on April 24, 2010.
