= Vàm Cống Bridge =

Vàm Cống Bridge Cầu Vàm Cống
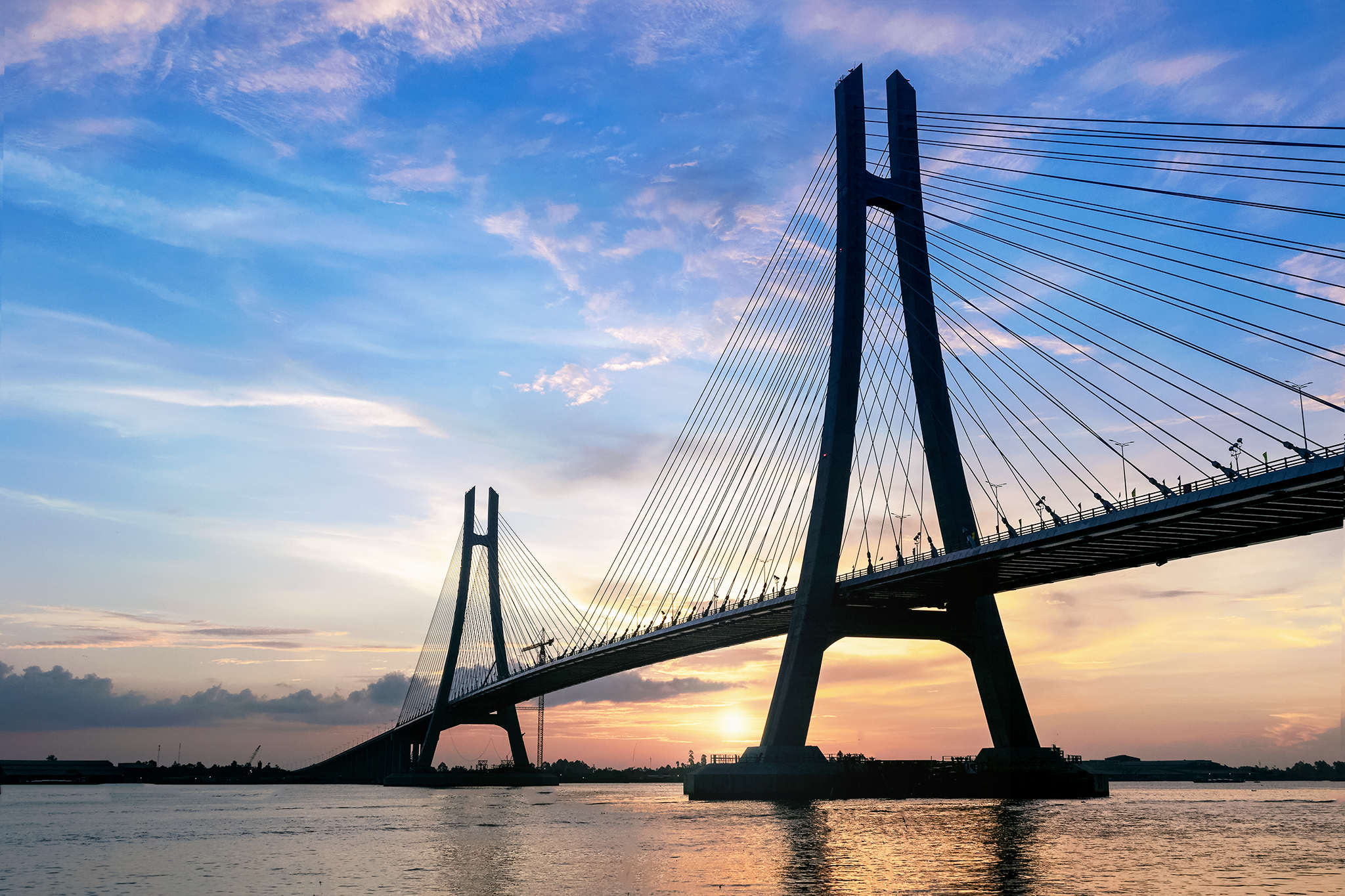
- Coordinates: 10°19′00.5″N 105°30′13.7″E
- Crosses: Sông Hậu Giang (Bassac River)
- Locale: Long Xuyên, Vietnam

Characteristics
- Design: Cable-stayed bridge
- Total length: 2,970 metres (9,744 ft), 8,740 metres (28,675 ft) include approach ramps
- Width: 21.6 metres (71 ft)
- Height: 500 metres (1,640 ft)
- Longest span: 450 metres (1,476 ft)
- Clearance above: 39 metres (128 ft)

History
- Constructed by: GS Engineering & Construction; Hanshin Engineering & Construction
- Construction start: September 10, 2013
- Opened: May 19, 2019

Location
- Interactive map of Vàm Cống Bridge

The Vàm Cống Bridge (Vietnamese: Cầu Vàm Cống) is a road bridge over the Hậu Giang River (also known as Bassac), a distributary of the Mekong River, in the city of Long Xuyên in Vietnam.

== Description ==
It is one of two large bridges on the Mỹ An – Lộ Tẻ – Rạch Sỏi freeway and part of the larger North–South Expressway West effort. At 2.970 kilometres (2 miles) long, it is the second-longest cable-stayed bridge in Vietnam.

== Planning ==
Before 2010, traffic across the Bassac river's banks were dependent on travel by wharf and ferry. The opening of the Cần Thơ Bridge in 2010 helped to connect the city of Cần Thơ with Vĩnh Long province, allowing for further economic development in the Mekong Delta. However, other high traffic areas of the Mekong River remained dependent on wharfs and ferries, including the Vàm Cống ferry that had been in operation since 1925.

In 2011, national transportation agencies in Vietnam proposed a transportation plan for the Mekong River Delta region, part of which included the construction of the Vàm Cống bridge to help integrate the greater highway system.

== Construction ==
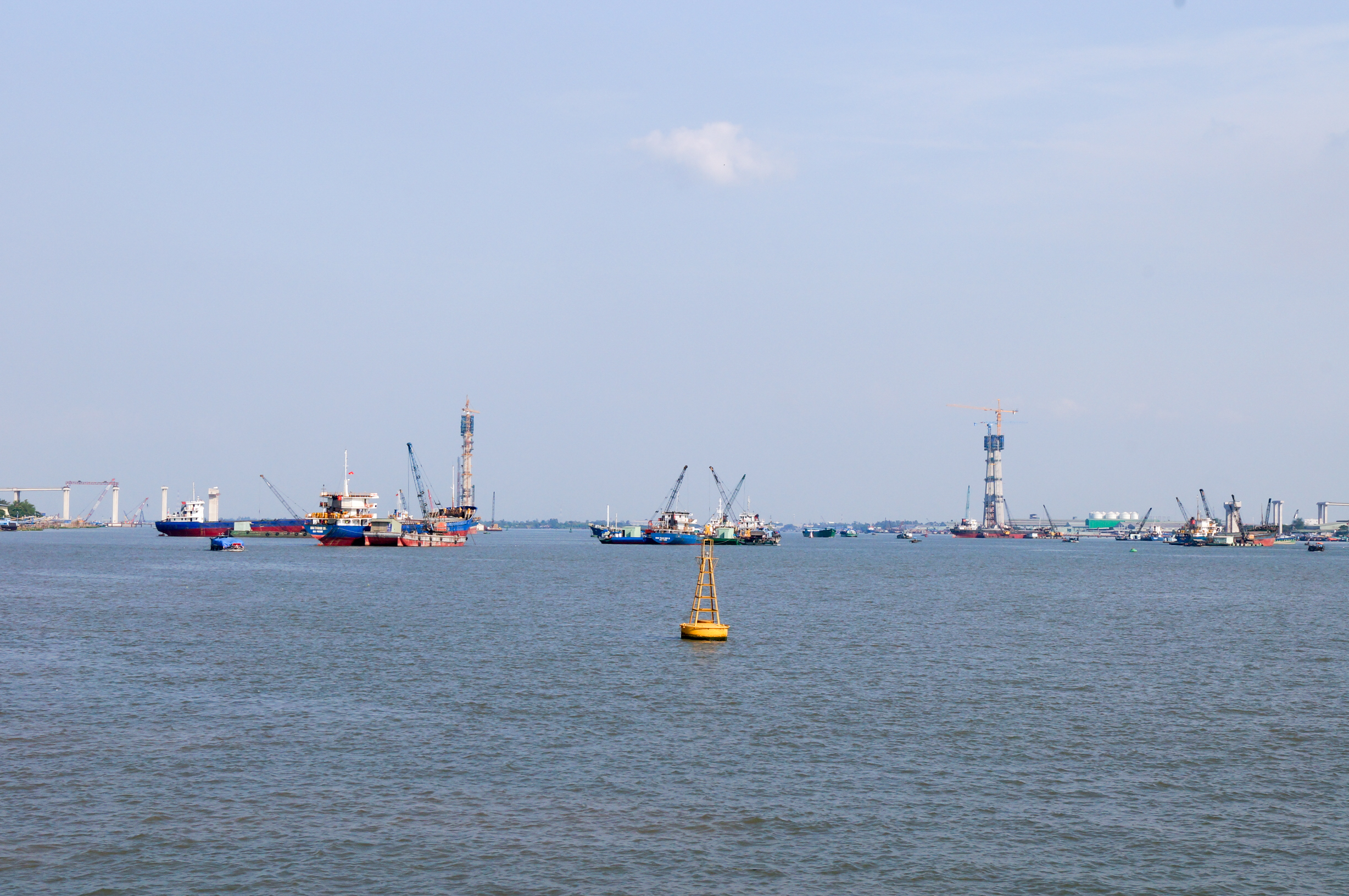
Cầu Vàm Cống amid construction in April 2016

On September 10, 2013, a groundbreaking ceremony took place in Đồng Tháp province. The project's consulting team included Dasan Consultants, Kunhwa Consulting and Engineering, and Pyunghwa Engineering Consultants, with the main construction contractors consisting of a joint venture between GS Engineering & Construction and Hanshin Engineering & Construction. Cienco 1 would serve as a subcontractor. The initial investment of 5.7 trillion VND is shared between the Korea International Cooperation Agency and the Vietnamese government. During construction, there was conflict around the management of the project, resulting in delays.

== Opening ==
All six lanes of the bridges were open to the public in May 2019. The project took five years to complete and is reported to have cost 5.7 trillion VND (approximately 240 billion KRW, US$202 million). The Asian Development Bank is working on an infrastructure project which will construct an additional approach road to the bridge.
