= Cẩm Lệ River =

River in Vietnam

Cầu Đỏ, Cẩm Lệ
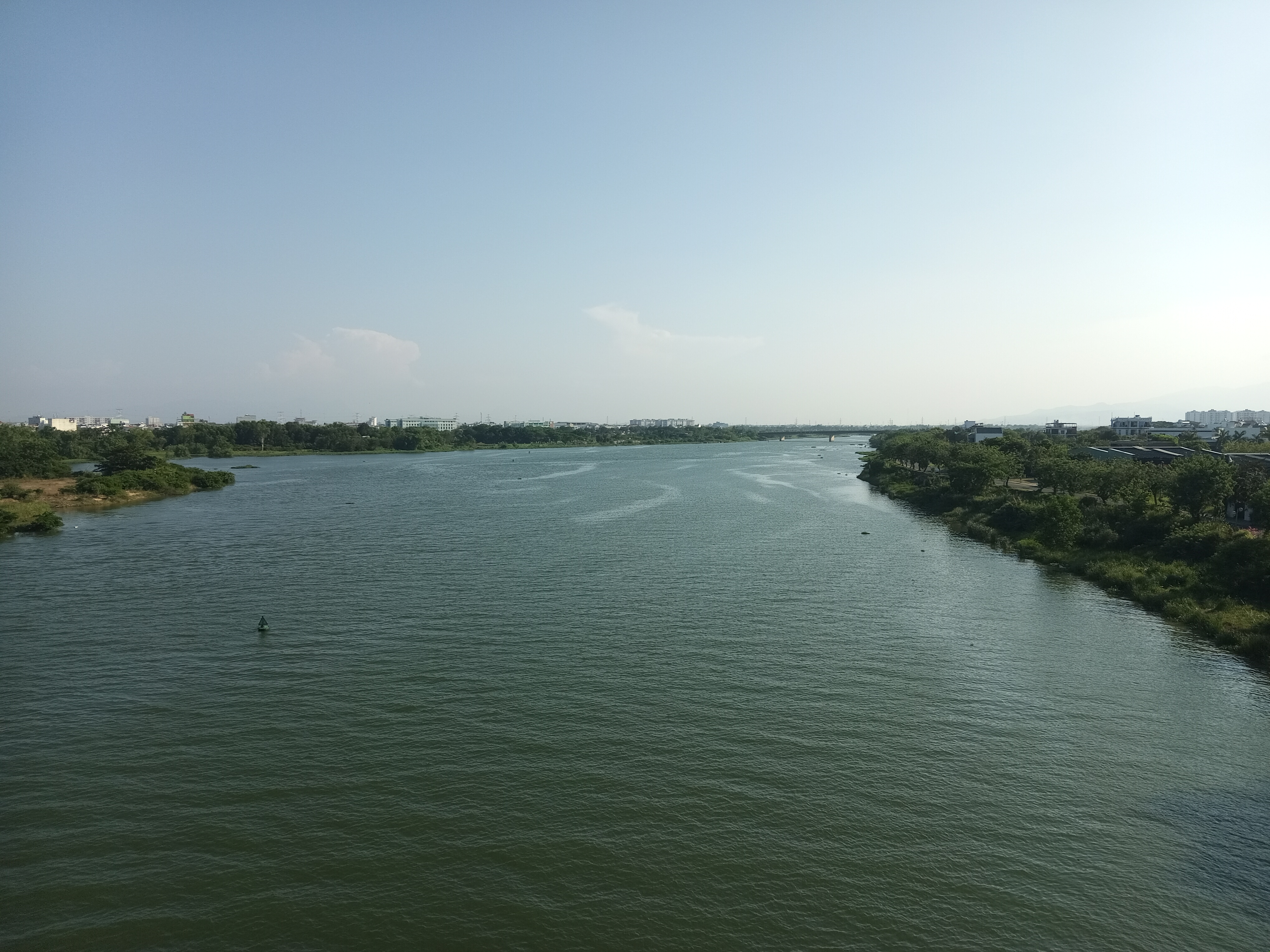
- View of the Cầu Đỏ/Cẩm Lệ River from Nguyễn Tri Phương bridge

Location
- Country: Vietnam
- City: Da Nang

Physical characteristics
- Source: Confluence of Túy Loan and Yên
  - location: boundary between Hòa Vang and Cẩm Lệ
  - coordinates: 15°59′40″N 108°09′43″E
- Mouth: Confluence with Đò Toản to form Hàn
  - location: boundary between Cẩm Lệ, Ngũ Hành Sơn, and Hải Châu
  - coordinates: 16°01′45″N 108°13′52″E

Basin features
- Bridges: Cầu Đỏ bridge, Cẩm Lệ bridge, Nguyễn Tri Phuong bridge, Hòa Xuân bridge

The Cầu Đỏ River (Vietnamese: sông Cầu Đỏ) or Cẩm Lệ River (Vietnamese: sông Cẩm Lệ) is a river in Da Nang, Vietnam. It is formed where the Yên and the Túy Loan join on the boundary between the districts Hòa Vang and Cẩm Lệ. Its flow mostly follows this district boundary, to finally flow between the wards Hòa Xuân and Khuê Trung of Cẩm Lệ district, to the tripoint of the districts Cẩm Lệ, Ngũ Hành Sơn, and Hải Châu, where it joins the Đò Toản to form the Hàn River.

The Da Nang Water Supply Company, which supplies the city of Da Nang with freshwater, relies in big part on the Cầu Đỏ River for water intake. During the dry season, this is made difficult by saltwater intrusion, which has become worse since the construction of hydroelectric projects upstream.

== Names ==
The two main names of the river are Cầu Đỏ and Cẩm Lệ. Many sources consider these to be equivalent and use either name for the entirety of the river. The official names, according to the Da Nang city authorities, are Cầu Đỏ from the start of the river until Nguyễn Tri Phuong bridge (which is the part that flows along the boundary between Hòa Vang and Cẩm Lệ districts), after which the name is Cẩm Lệ until it ends in the Hàn River (which is the part that flows through Cẩm Lệ district).

There is agreement that the name Cẩm Lệ comes from a fruit that was sold there, but there is disagreement on which fruit exactly: a black-skinned bitter melon or a type of lychee. A folk etymology traces the name to the tears (Vietnamese: lệ) shed for a girl named Cẩm.

The name Cầu Đỏ means “red bridge”, and comes from the name of one of the bridges spanning the river. This bridge used to be red, but is now white.
