= Nam Dương (disambiguation) =

Nam Dương may refer to several places in Vietnam, including:

- Nam Dương, Bắc Ninh, a commune of Bắc Ninh city
- Nam Dương, Đà Nẵng, a former ward of Hải Châu District
- Nam Dương, Nam Định, a former commune of Nam Trực District
