= Cai River =

Cai River may refer to:

- Caí River, Rio Grande do Sul, Brazil
- several rivers named Cái in Vietnam
