= Cái River =

Cai River may refer to:

- Cái River (Quảng Nam)
- Cái River (Khánh Hòa)
- the Red River (Asia)
- the Vĩnh Điện River
