= Hải Châu district =

Coordinates: 16°03′38″N 108°11′46″E

Hải Châu district Quận Hải Châu District I (Quận I)
- Urban district
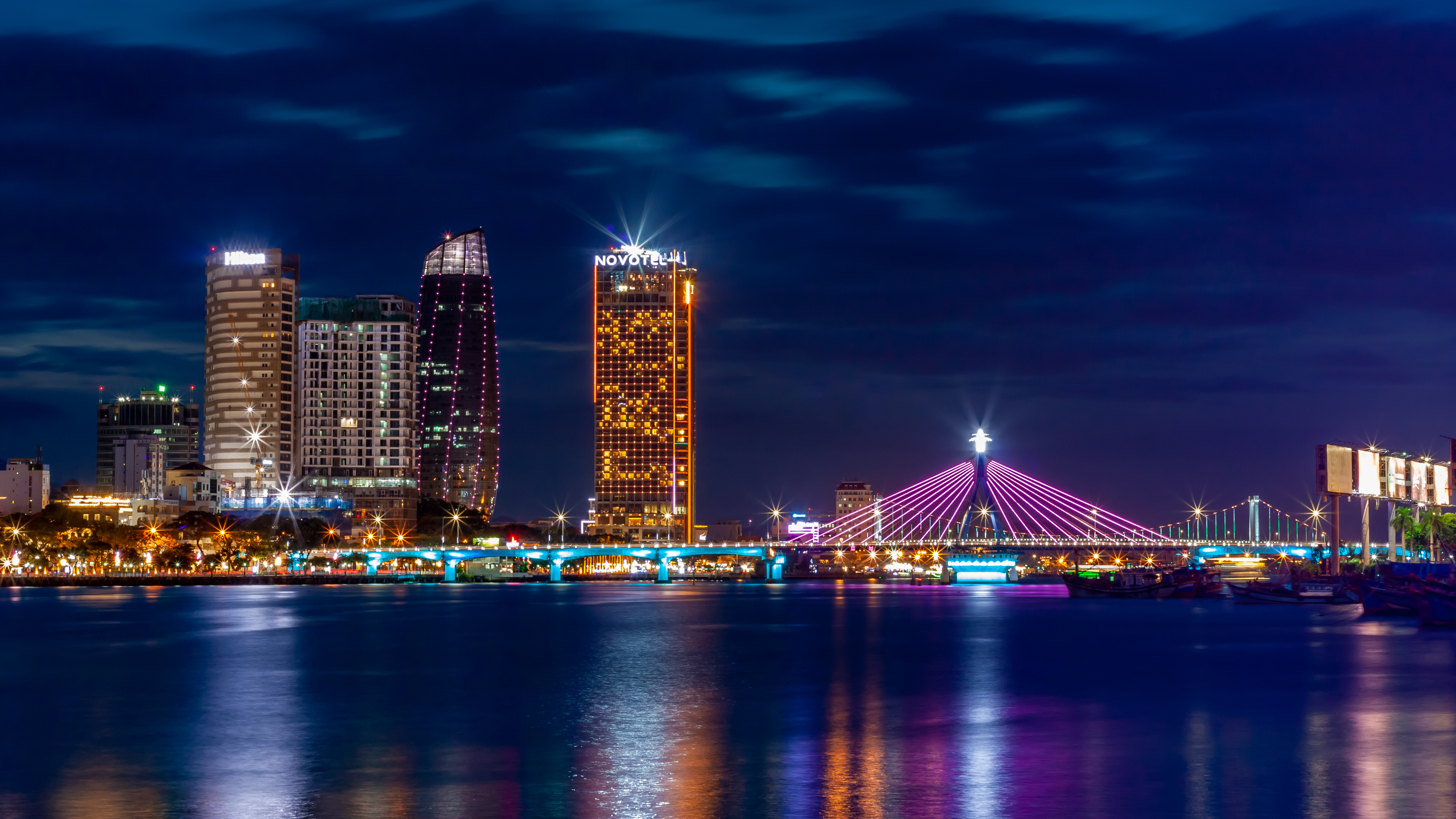
- Hải Châu District as seen from Han River Bridge.

- Seal

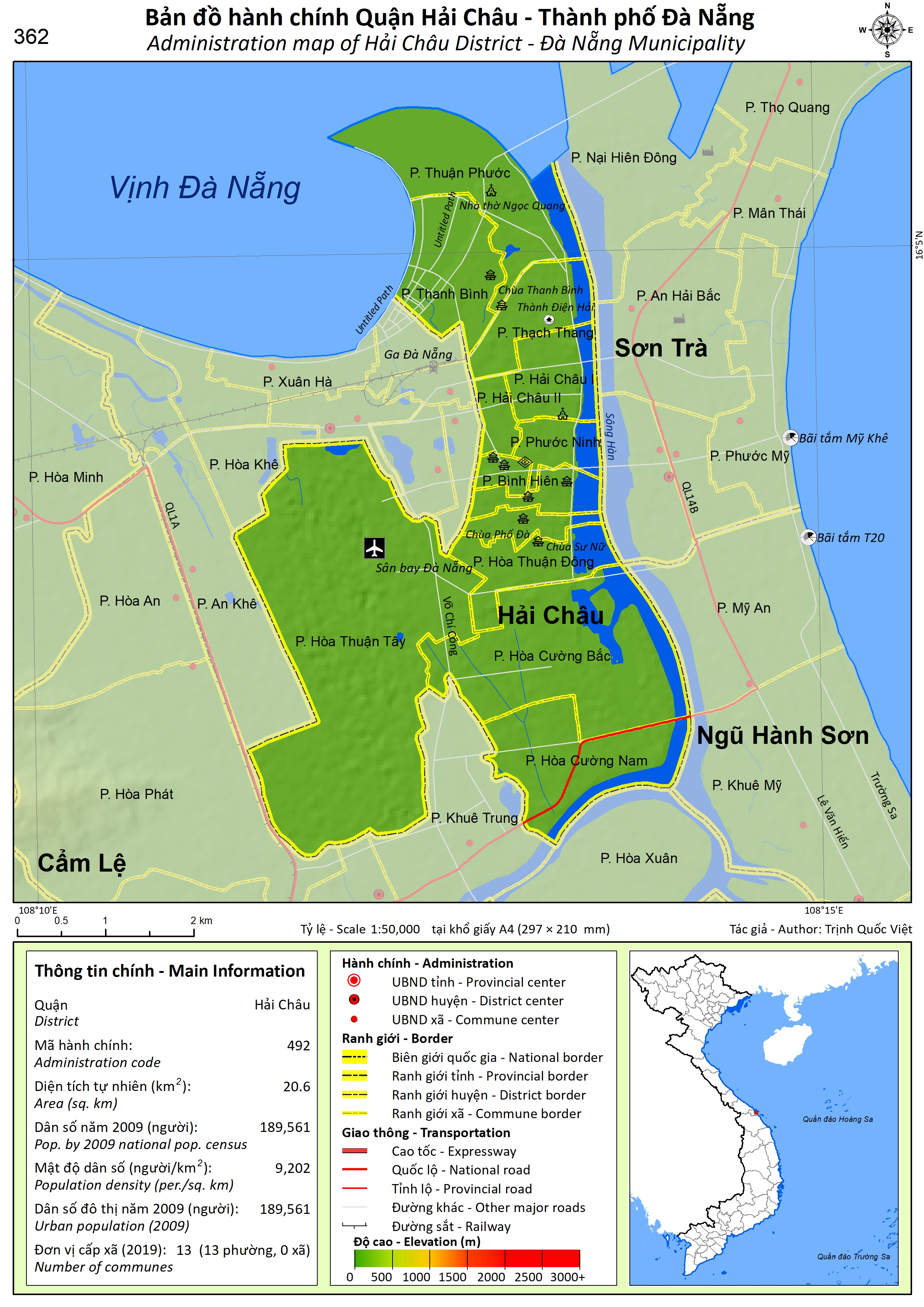
- Administration map of the district
- Interactive map of Hải Châu district
- Location within Vietnam Location within Southeast Asia Location within Asia
- Country: Vietnam
- Region: South Central Coast
- Municipality: Da Nang
- Founded: 1997
- Capital: Da Nang

Government
  - Chairman of the People's Committee: Lê Tự Gia Thạnh
  - Chairman of the Fatherland Front: Võ Thành Trung
  - Chief Justice of the People's Court: Phạm Khắc Tường
  - Head of People's Procuracy: Ngô Thị Tuyết Hồng

Area
  - Urban district: 8.1 sq mi (21 km^{2})

Population (2018)
  - Urban district: 221,324
  - Density: 27,300/sq mi (10,540/km^{2})
  - Urban: 100%
- Time zone: UTC+07:00 (Indochina Time)
- Website: haichau.danang.gov.vn

Hải Châu was an urban district (quận) of Da Nang in the South Central Coast region of Vietnam. Since districts were abolished in 2025, it ceased to exist. Its northern wards were rearranged into Hải Châu ward, while the southern wards were rearranged into Hòa Cường ward.

It was the administrative, cultural and commercial center of the city. The municipal hall, theater and central market are located in what used to be Hải Châu district. Da Nang International Airport is also located on the boundary of Hải Châu district and just about 3 kilometres (1.9 mi) away from the district's center.

Hải Châu district and Khuê Trung Ward of Cẩm Lệ District, which was separated from Hải Châu district to form Cẩm Lệ district in 2005, was called District I (Quận Nhứt) in the Republic of Vietnam period.

== Administration ==
Hải Châu was one of the central districts of Da Nang. Da Nang Bay lies north of the district, Thanh Khê district lay to the west, Sơn Trà and Ngũ Hành Sơn districts lay to the east, and Cẩm Lệ district lay to the west and south.

Hải Châu was administratively divided into 13 wards (phường):

- Hải Châu 1
- Hải Châu 2
- Thạch Thang
- Thanh Bình
- Thuận Phước
- Hòa Thuận Đông
- Hòa Thuận Tây
- Nam Dương
- Phước Ninh
- Bình Thuận
- Bình Hiên
- Hòa Cường Bắc
- Hòa Cường Nam

As of 2003 the district had a population of 197,118. The district covered an area of 21 km^{2}. The administrative center of the district was in Phước Ninh ward.
