= Quảng Huế River =

River in Vietnam

Quảng Huế

Location
- Country: Vietnam
- Municipality: Da Nang
- Commune: Đại Lộc

Physical characteristics
- Source: Distributary of Vu Gia
  - coordinates: 15°52′16″N 108°05′56″E
- Mouth: Confluence with Thu Bồn
  - coordinates: 15°50′45″N 108°07′00″E

The Quảng Huế River (Vietnamese: sông Quảng Huế) is a river in Đại Lộc commune, Da Nang, Vietnam. It is the first connection between the Vu Gia and the Thu Bồn River, and transfers water from the Vu Gia to the Thu Bồn. As a result, the flow of water through Quảng Huế River has a large impact on the flow distribution in the rivers downstream from it, such as the Thu Bồn and the Hàn River.

A large flood in 2000 created the "New Quảng Huế" distributary, which allowed most of the flow of the Vu Gia to flow into the Thu Bồn during the dry season. Before this, most of the flow of the Vu Gia River went, through a multitude of different channels, into the Hàn river in the Đà Nẵng city center, where it is an important source of freshwater. The new channel had to be dammed to restore the original flow. The flow between the Vu Gia and the Thu Bồn is important for the livelihoods of many people downstream in the Đà Nẵng municipality. Regulating this flow therefore remains a concern for the local authorities.
