= Yên River =

River in Vietnam

Yên Thạch Bồ
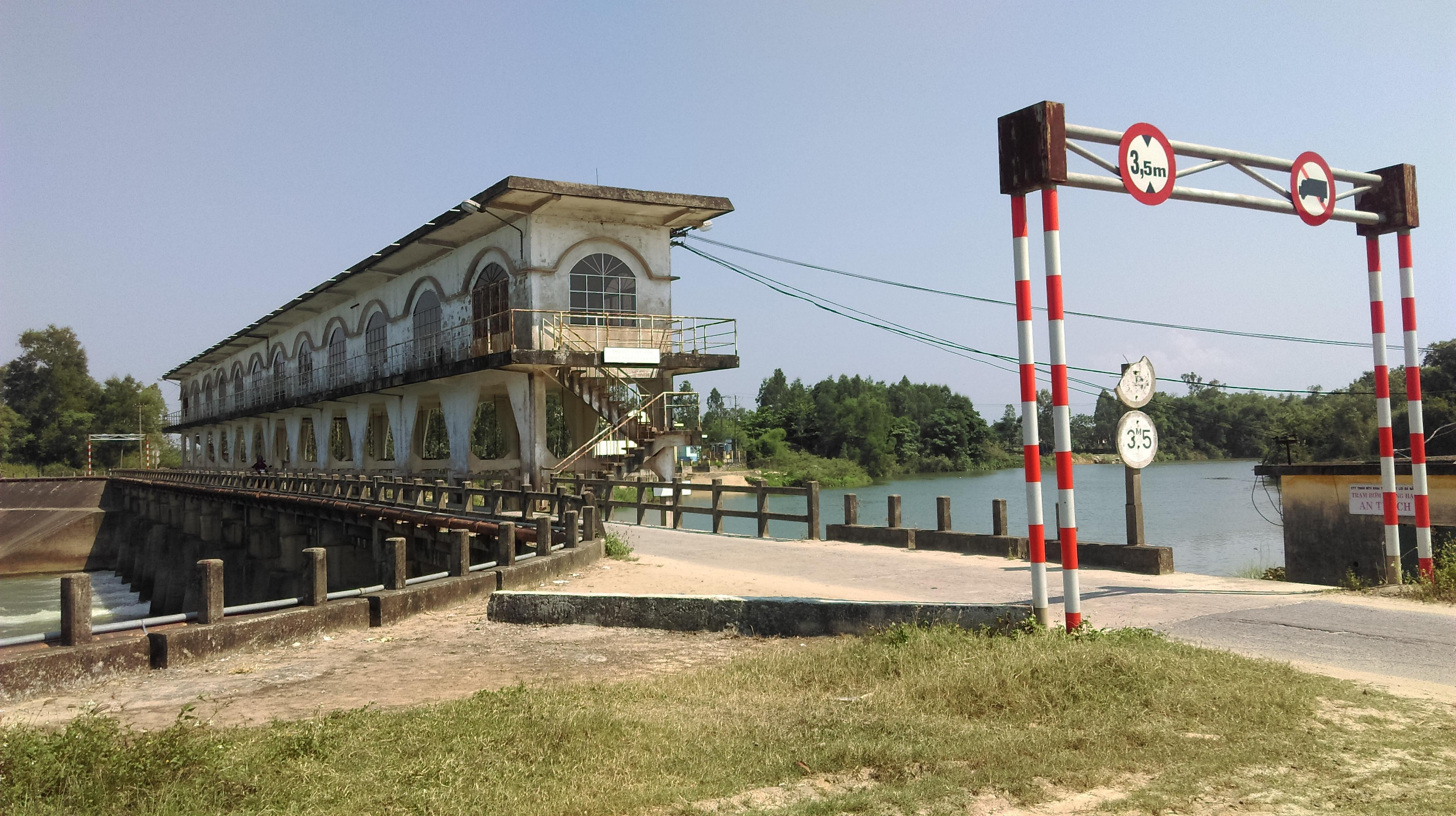
- An Trạch irrigation dam on the Yên River

Location
- Country: Vietnam
- Municipality: Da Nang

Physical characteristics
- Source: Distributary of Vu Gia
  - location: boundary between Đại Lộc commune and Điện Bàn Bắc ward
  - coordinates: 15°53′51″N 108°08′13″E
- Mouth: Confluence with Túy Loan to form Cầu Đỏ
  - location: boundary between Hòa Vang commune, Hòa Tiến commune, and Cẩm Lệ ward
  - coordinates: 15°59′40″N 108°09′43″E

The Yên River (Vietnamese: sông Yên), also known as the Thạch Bồ River (Vietnamese: sông Thạch Bồ), is a river of Da Nang, Vietnam. It is formed by the split of the Vu Gia into the Yên and the Bình Phước on the boundary between Đại Lộc commune and Điện Bàn Bắc ward. It flows for 22 kilometres until the boundary between Hòa Vang commune, Hòa Tiến commune, and Cẩm Lệ ward, where it joins the Túy Loan to form the Cầu Đỏ.

In colonial times, the An Trạch irrigation dam was built across the river in Hòa Tiến commune, Da Nang. Every year, fish –especially sardines– migrate to the area to lay their eggs, where local fishers catch them for food.
