= Cổ Cò River =

River in Vietnam

Cổ Cò Đế Võng, Lộ Cảnh Giang

Location
- Country: Vietnam
- Municipality: Da Nang

Physical characteristics
- Source: Distributary of Thu Bồn
  - location: Hội An Đông commune
  - coordinates: 15°52′24″N 108°23′13″E
- Mouth: Confluence with Bến Đò Toản
  - location: boundary between Ngũ Hành Sơn and Hòa Xuân wards
  - coordinates: 16°00′46″N 108°14′46″E

The Cồ Cò River (Vietnamese: sông Cổ Cò) is a partially silted river in the municipality of Da Nang, Vietnam. It used to connect the Thu Bồn with the Hàn River. From the 16th to the 18th century, the river was an important shipping lane connecting the port cities of Hội An and Da Nang, especially to ships for which the sea route was problematic.

In the 18th century, the river started silting and the Vĩnh Điện River started gaining prominence as a shipping lane. When the French took power over the area in the late 19th century, the Cổ Cò was still open to shipping, but by the end of the century it was too silted and its use ended. There are plans to dredge it and reopen it for commercial shipping between Hội An and the Da Nang city center and for tourism, but as of 2024 only the part inside the boundaries of Ngũ Hành Sơn ward has been completed.
