= Vĩnh Điện River =

Vĩnh Điện, Cái, Bến Đò Toản Tứ Câu, Cổ Mân, Mân Quang, Đò Toản, Đô Tỏa
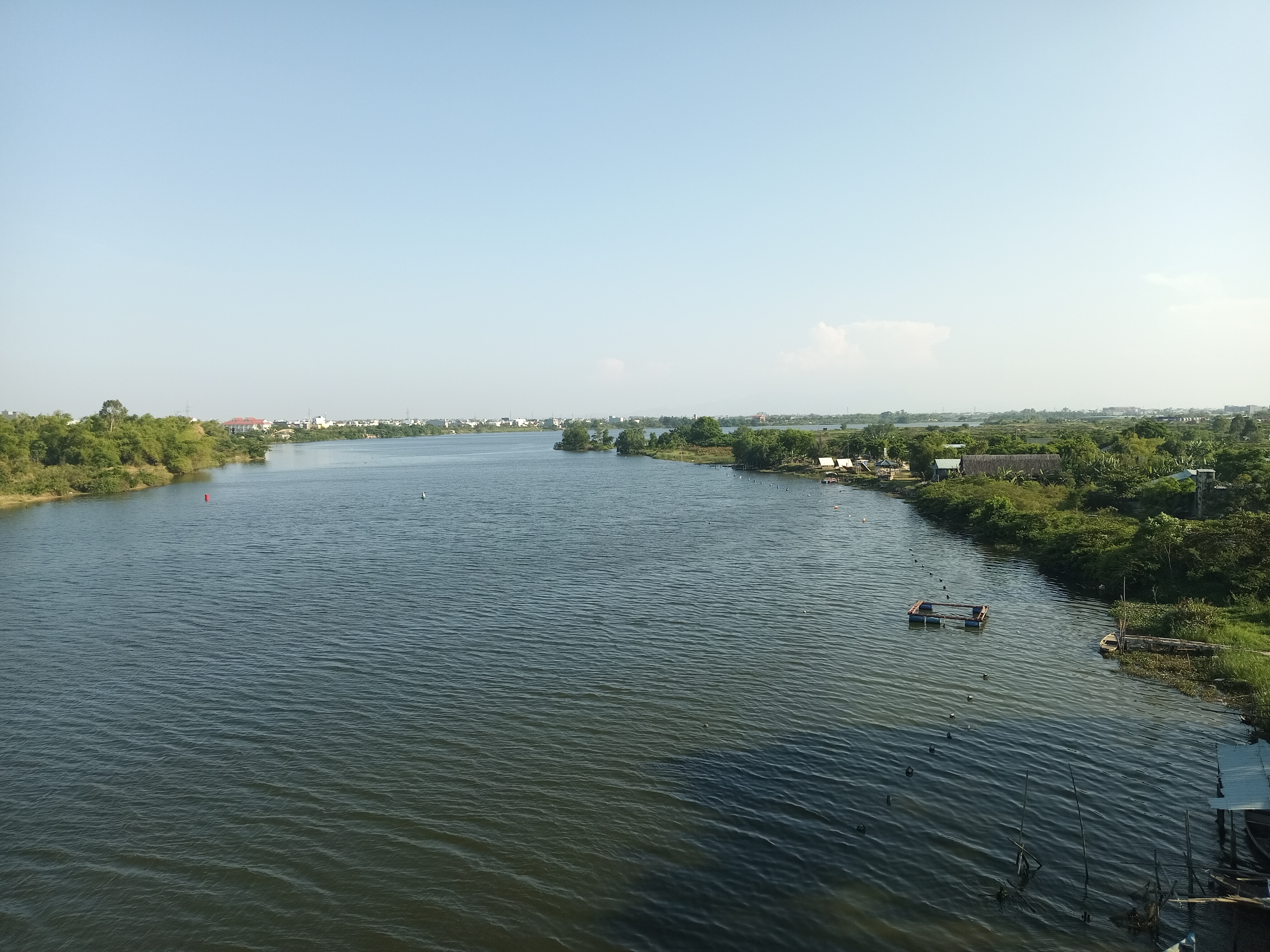
- View of the Vĩnh Điện/Cái/Đò Toản River from Khuê Đông bridge

Location
- Country: Vietnam
- Municipality: Da Nang

Physical characteristics
- Source: Distributary of Thu Bồn
  - location: Điện Bàn ward
  - coordinates: 15°51′56″N 108°14′9″E
- Mouth: Confluence with Cẩm Lệ to form Hàn
  - location: boundary between Hòa Xuân, Ngũ Hành Sơn, and Hòa Cường wards
  - coordinates: 16°01′45″N 108°13′52″E

Basin features
- Bridges: Vĩnh Điện Bridge, Quảng Hậu Bridge, Phong Hồ Bridge, New Vĩnh Điện Bridge, Tứ Câu Bridge, Hòa Phước Bridge, Khuê Đông Bridge, Trung Lương Bridge

The Vĩnh Điện River (Vietnamese: sông Vĩnh Điện), Cái River (Vietnamese: sông Cái), or Đò Toản River (Vietnamese: Bến Đò Toản) is a river of the municipality of Da Nang, Vietnam. It connects the Thu Bồn with the delta of the Vu Gia (specifically the Cẩm Lệ branch of it).

== Geography ==
The river has a regular flow, an average depth of 1.5 m, and a width from 80 to 150 m, allowing its use for shipping. Traffic on the river has known ups and downs, but is currently around a million tonnes per year. The river is especially known for being important to the transport of coal from Nông Sơn and sand from the Thu Bồn river to the Da Nang city center.

== History ==
The river is a canal that was dug in the 1820s on the order of emperor Minh Mạng of the Nguyễn dynasty. A first canal was dug in 1822, but this was too narrow, and a wider canal was dug in 1826. To celebrate the achievement, the name of the river was included on the Dụ Đỉnh, one of the nine tripod cauldrons in the imperial palace of Huế.

For a while, the Vĩnh Điện became the major waterway connecting the port of Da Nang with the Thu Bồn and Hội An. Previously, the Cổ Cò River had played this role, but it was becoming silted. At its height in the 1840s, the Vĩnh Điện was used to transport sugar and cinnamon for international export.

Under emperor Tự Đức, the importance of the Vĩnh Điện for shipping was waning. In the 1870s, it was found that the Vĩnh Điện was taking water away from other waterways. This caused silting in these other waterways and lack of water for irrigation in many localities. To remedy this, the Ái Nghĩa canal was constructed (now considered part of the Vu Gia).

== Names ==
According to circulars from 2015, the official name of the river is Vĩnh Điện when flowing through what was then Quảng Nam province. When it enters what was then the territory of Da Nang city, the official name is first Cái, and then Bến Đò Toản (lit. 'Toản Ferry Station'). This latter name is after a now-abandoned river ferry station in Trung Lương hamlet (Hòa Xuân ward, Da Nang) – close to where Trung Lương Bridge is now.

It has many other names, as it is often given the name of whatever locality it flows through. As such, it is called Tứ Câu after flowing under Tứ Câu bridge, Cổ Mân when flowing through Cổ Mân village (Hòa Xuân ward, Da Nang), and Mân Quang when flowing through Mân Quang village (Ngũ Hành Sơn ward, Da Nang).

The final stretch is sometimes called Đô Tỏa, but according to Đà Nẵng Online this seems to be a copying error due to Google Maps.
