= Ngũ Hành Sơn, Da Nang =

Coordinates: 16°00′30″N 108°15′09″E

Ngũ Hành Sơn ward Phường Ngũ Hành Sơn
- Ward
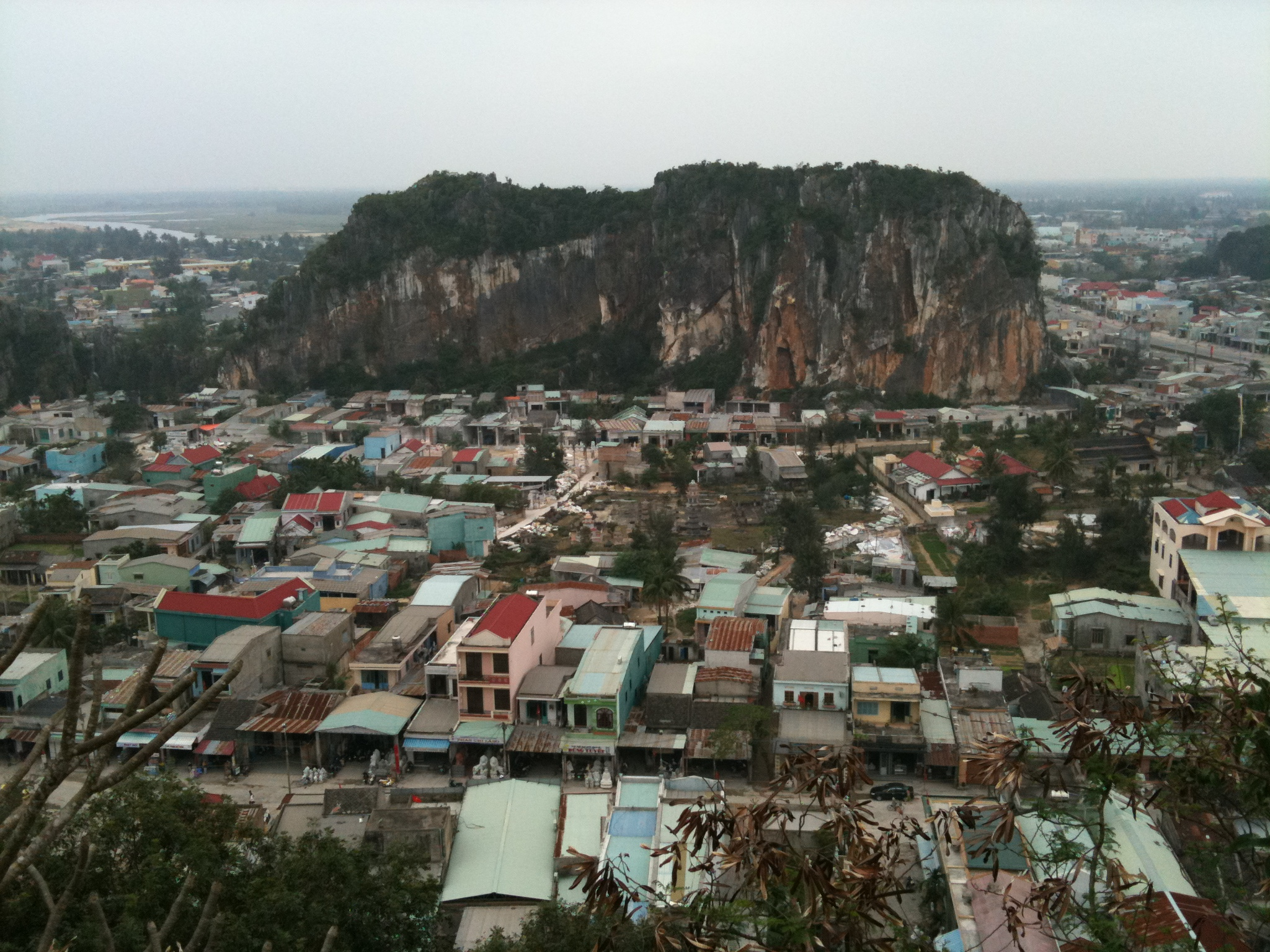
- Marble Mountains

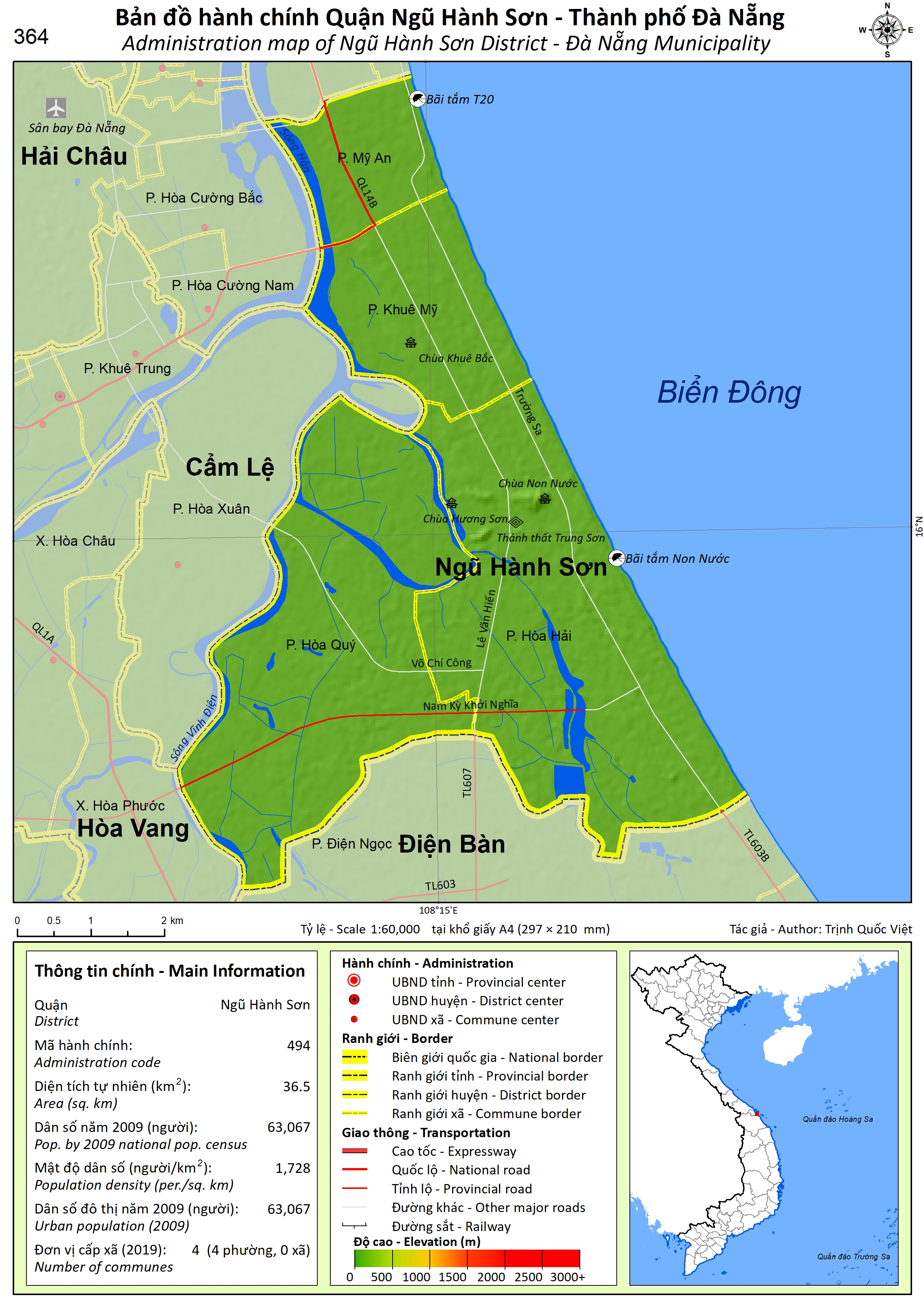
- Administration map of the district in Da Nang
- Country: Vietnam
- Region: South Central Coast
- Municipality: Da Nang
- Capital: Da Nang

Area
  - Total: 14 sq mi (37 km^{2})

Population (2018)
  - Total: 115,872
- Time zone: UTC+07:00 (Indochina Time)

Ngũ Hành Sơn is a ward of Da Nang in the South Central Coast region of Vietnam.

As of 2003, the ward had a population of 50,105. The ward covers an area of 37 km^{2} (14 sq mi).
