= Cẩm Lệ district =

Coordinates: 16°01′00″N 108°12′10″E

Cẩm Lệ District Quận Cẩm Lệ
- Urban district
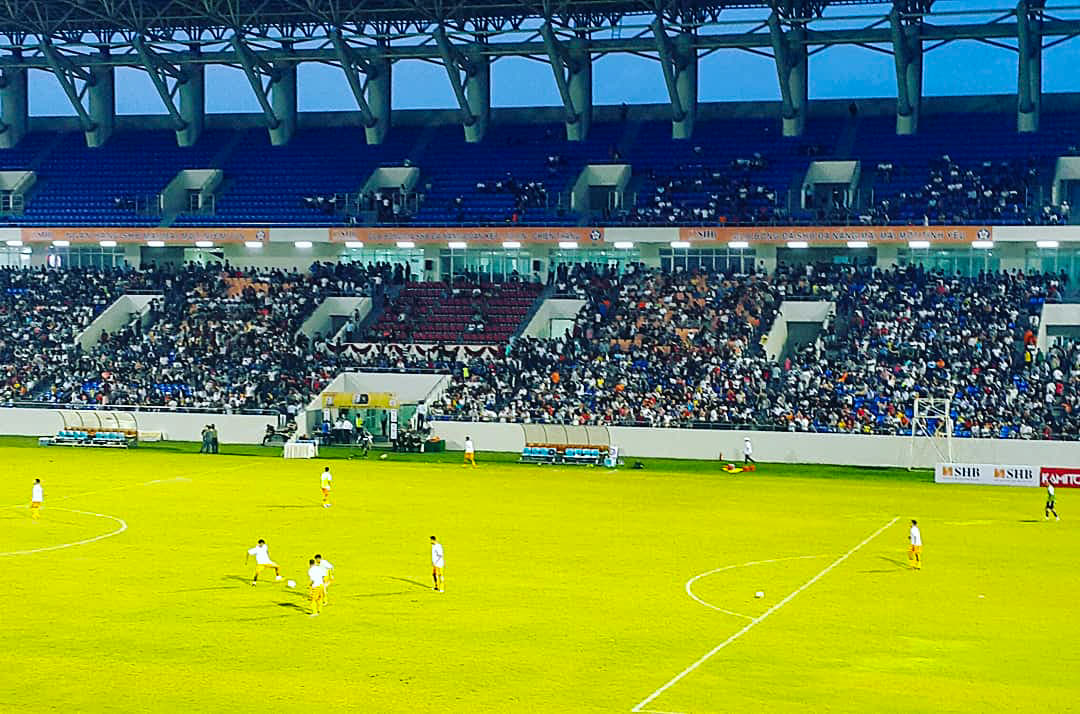
- Hòa Xuân Stadium in Cẩm Lệ District

- Seal

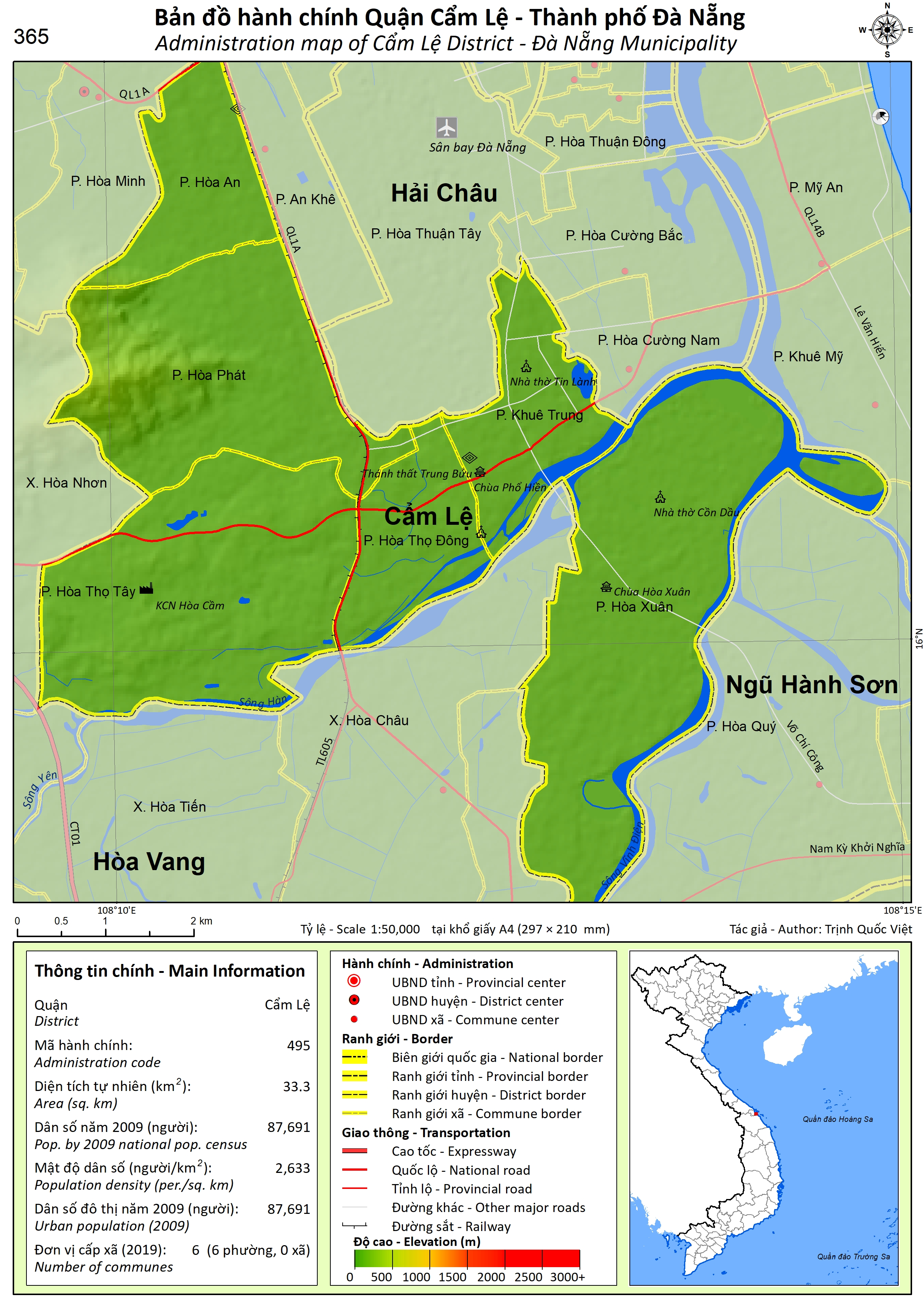
- Administration map of the district in Da Nang
- Country: Vietnam
- Region: South Central Coast
- Municipality: Da Nang
- Time zone: UTC+7 (Indochina Time)

Cẩm Lệ is an urban district of Da Nang in the South Central Coast region of Vietnam.

== Administration ==
The district was established by Government Decree No. 102/2005/ND-CP on August 5, 2005.

The district includes six urban wards (phường):

- Khuê Trung
- Hòa Thọ Đông
- Hòa Thọ Tây
- Hòa An
- Hòa Phát
- Hòa Xuân

As of 2003 the district had a population of 71,429. The district covers an area of 33.3 km^{2} (12.9 sq mi). The district capital lies at Hòa Thọ Đông ward.
