= Vu Gia River =

River in Vietnam

Vu Gia Ô Da, Ái Nghĩa
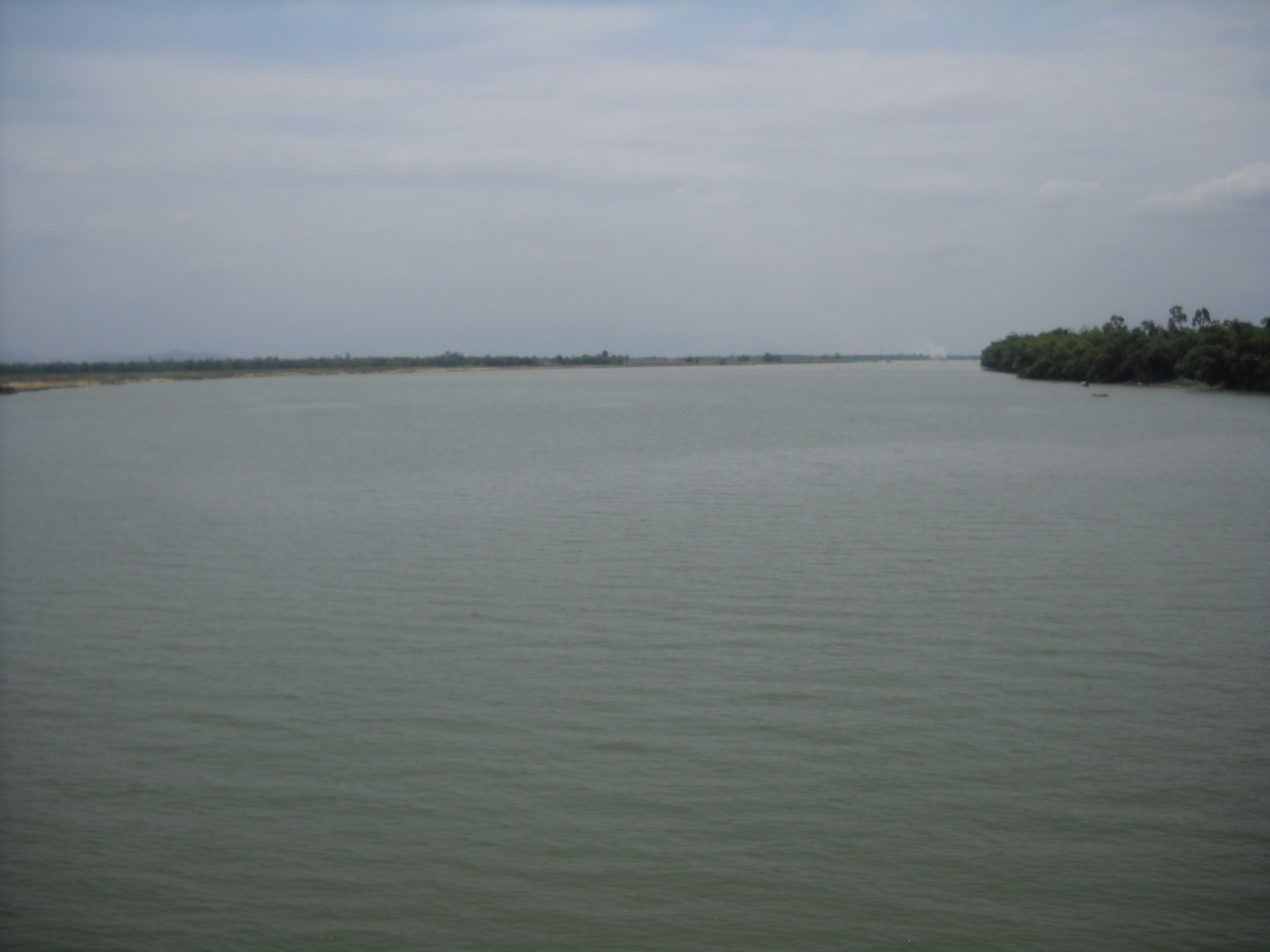
- The Vu Gia River in Điện Bàn Tây, Da Nang.

Location
- Country: Vietnam
- Municipality: Da Nang

Physical characteristics
- Source: Confluence of Bung and Cái
  - location: Thượng Đức commune
  - coordinates: 15°49′05″N 107°50′51″E
- Mouth: split into Yên and Bình Phước
  - location: boundary between Đại Lộc commune and Điện Bàn Bắc ward
  - coordinates: 15°53′51″N 108°08′13″E

The Vu Gia River (Vietnamese: sông Vu Gia) is a river in the municipality of Da Nang in central Vietnam. It is formed by the confluence of the Bung and the Cái in Thượng Đức commune. It flows through the communes Thượng Đức, Hà Nha, Vu Gia, and Đại Lộc, until the boundary with Điện Bàn Bắc ward, where it splits into the Yên and the Bình Phước. After the Quảng Huế River branches off, the river is commonly called Ái Nghĩa River (Vietnamese: sông Ái Nghĩa). (Note: Some authors consider the Ái Nghĩa River to be a separate river, while the Quảng Huế River is the continuation (under a different name) of the Vu Gia. In this view, the Vu Gia is a tributary of the Thu Bồn.) The Vu Gia is part of the Vu Gia–Thu Bồn river basin, and the Vu Gia and the Thu Bồn seasonally undergo exchange of flow.

Before 2000, most of the flow of the Vu Gia River went, through a multitude of different channels, into the Hàn river in the Đà Nẵng city center, where it is an important source of freshwater. A large flood in 2000 created the "New Quảng Huế" distributary, which allowed most of the flow of the Vu Gia to flow into the Thu Bồn during the dry season. This new channel had to be dammed to restore the original flow. The flow between the Vu Gia and the Thu Bồn is important for the livelihoods of many people downstream in the Đà Nẵng municipality. Regulating this flow therefore remains a concern for the local authorities.
