= Túy Loan River =

River in Vietnam

The Túy Loan River (Vietnamese: Sông Túy Loan) is a river of Da Nang, Vietnam. It flows for 30 kilometres.
