= Long Phú =

Long Phú may refer to several places in Vietnam, including:

- Long Phú: ward of An Giang province.
- Long Phú: commune of Cần Thơ municipality
- Long Phú 1: ward of Cần Thơ municipality.
- Long Phú Thuận: commune of Đồng Tháp province

== Former places same name ==
- Long Phú district of Sóc Trăng province.
- Long Phú: commune-level town and capital of Long Phú district in Sóc Trăng province (today part of Long Phú commune, Cần Thơ municipality).
- Long Phú: commune of Long Phú district in Sóc Trăng province (today part of Long Phú commune, Cần Thơ municipality).
- Long Phú: ward of Long Mỹ district-level town in Hậu Giang province (today part of Long Phú 1 ward, Cần Thơ municipality).
- Long Phú: commune of Tam Bình district in Vĩnh Long province (today part of Song Phú commune, Vĩnh Long province).

== See also ==
- Phú Long (disambiguation)
