= Long Phú, Cần Thơ =

Long Phú
- Commune
- Country: Vietnam
- Municipality: Cần Thơ
- Establish: June 16, 2025

Area
  - Total: 76.77 km^{2} (29.64 sq mi)

Population (2025)
  - Total: 39,763 people
  - Density: 517.9/km^{2} (1,341/sq mi)
- Time zone: UTC+07:00

Long Phú is a commune in Cần Thơ municipality, Vietnam. It is one of 103 communes and wards in the city following the 2025 reorganization.

== Geography ==
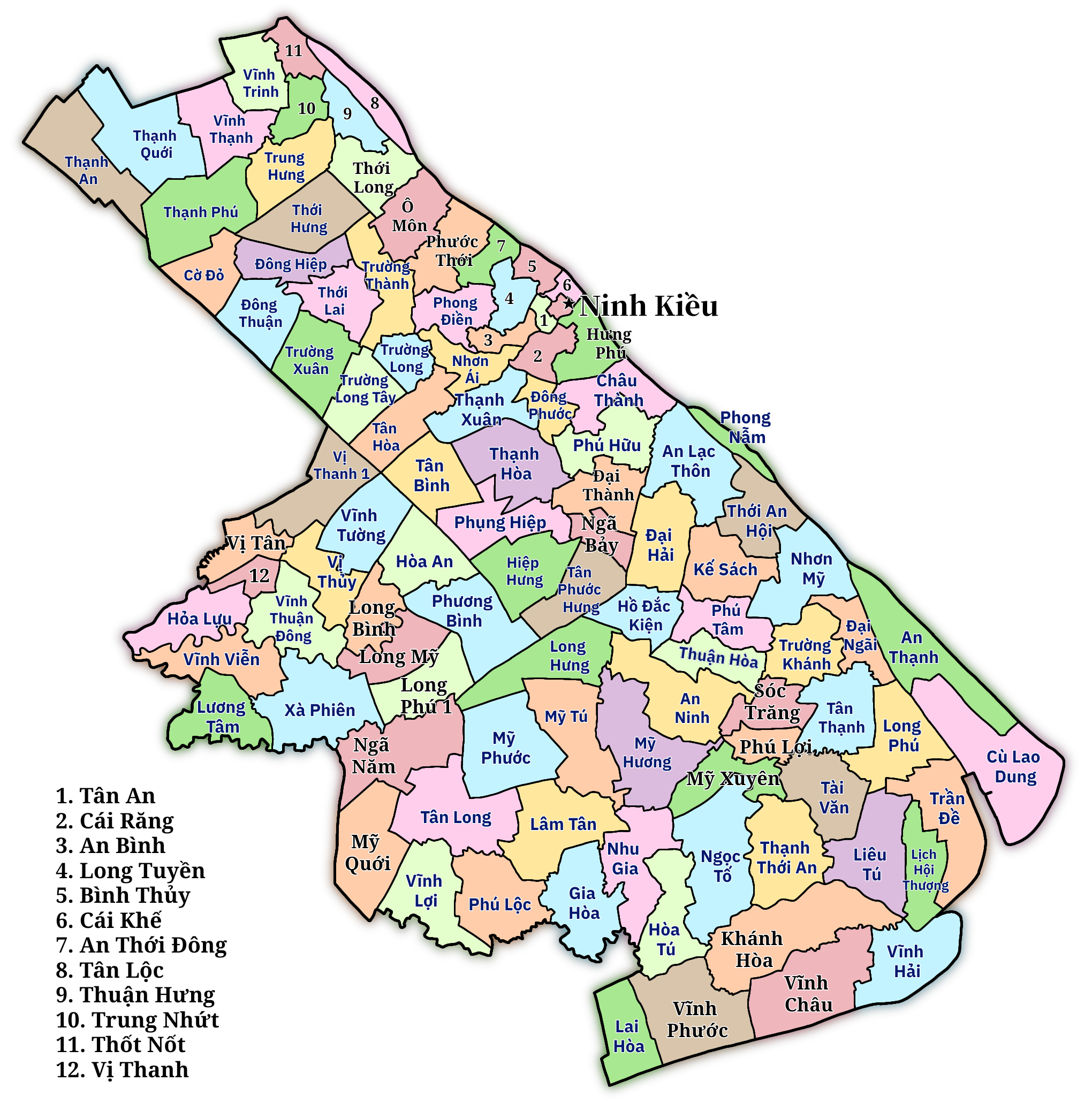
Location of Long Phú commune on Cần Thơ municipality map.

Long Phú is a commune located in the lower reaches of the Hậu Giang river, southern part of Cần Thơ municipality. The commune has the following geographical location:

- To the south, it borders Trần Đề commune and Liêu Tú commune.
- To the east, it borders two island communes: An Thạnh and Cù Lao Dung.
- To the north, it borders Đại Ngãi commune.
- To the west, it borders Tài Văn commune and Tân Thạnh commune.

== History ==
Prior to 2025, Long Phú commune was formerly Long Phú commune-level town and Long Phú commune, both belonging to Long Phú district, Sóc Trăng province.

On June 12, 2025, the Standing Committee of the National Assembly of Vietnam issued Resolution No. 202/2025/QH15 on the reorganization of provincial-level administrative units. Accordingly:

- Cần Thơ municipality was established by merging the entire area and population of Cần Thơ municipality, Hậu Giang province, and Sóc Trăng province.

On June 16, 2025, the Standing Committee of the National Assembly of Vietnam issued Resolution No. 1668/NQ-UBTVQH15 on the reorganization of commune-level administrative units in Cần Thơ municipality. Accordingly:

- Long Phú commune was established by merging the entire area and population of Long Phú town and Long Phú commune (formerly part of Long Phú district).
