= Duyên Hải (disambiguation) =

In Vietnamese, duyên hải means "coastal". Duyên Hải may also refer to several places in Vietnam, including:

- Duyên Hải: ward of Vĩnh Long province.

== Old place name ==
- Duyên Hải (town), a district-level town of Trà Vinh Province
- Duyên Hải district, a rural district of Trà Vinh Province
