= Sóc Trăng (city) =

Former provincial city and capital of the former Sóc Trăng province, Vietnam

- Provincial city
- (Class-2)
- A view in Sóc Trăng
- Interactive map of Sóc Trăng
- Location of Sóc Trăng in Vietnam
- Coordinates: 9°36′10″N 105°58′25″E
- Country: Vietnam
- Province: Sóc Trăng
- Dissolution: July 1st, 2025

Government
  - Type: Provincial city

Area
  - Total: 76.01 km^{2} (29.35 sq mi)

Population (2024)
  - Total: 163,735
  - Density: 2,154/km^{2} (5,579/sq mi)

Sóc Trăng (Khmer: ស្រុកឃ្លាំង Srok Khleang lit. 'Land of depositories') is a former provincial city and capital of the former Sóc Trăng province, Vietnam. It was upgraded from a town (thị xã) to a city following decree 22/2007/NĐ-CP on 8 February 2007. The current administrative area of Soc Trang city includes Sóc Trăng ward, Phú Lợi ward, and a part of Mỹ Xuyên ward of Cần Thơ city, Vietnam.

== History ==
During the French colonial period, on December 20, 1899, the Governor-General of Indochina issued a decree converting the "hạt tham biện" (administrative regions) into provinces, and on January 1, 1900, the Sóc Trăng administrative region became Sóc Trăng Province, with its provincial capital located in Khánh Hưng village.

During the era of the State of Vietnam and the Republic of Vietnam, the name of Sóc Trăng Province and its capital remained unchanged. After 1956, villages were renamed as communes. In February 1950, Sóc Trăng town was established. The town's boundaries were adjusted in 1953 and 1961. In 1956, the Republic of Vietnam government merged Sóc Trăng and Bạc Liêu to form Ba Xuyên Province, with its capital located in Khánh Hưng. However, the revolutionary government continued to use the name Sóc Trăng.

After 1975, the revolutionary government took over, and in 1976, Sóc Trăng, Cần Thơ, and Cần Thơ city were merged to form Hậu Giang province, with Sóc Trăng town becoming part of Hậu Giang province.

On December 26, 1991, Hậu Giang province was split into Cần Thơ and Sóc Trăng provinces, and Sóc Trăng district-level town became the provincial capital. In 1995, Sóc Trăng district-level town expanded its boundaries and established additional wards. In 2007, Sóc Trăng district-level town was upgraded to Sóc Trăng provincial city. By 2022, Sóc Trăng provincial city was recognized as a class-II urban area.

== Etymology ==
Sóc Trăng was known as Ba Xuyên during Minh Mạng's admininistration.

During the Nguyễn Dynasty of emperor Minh Mạng, it was given the Sino-Vietnamese name Nguyệt Giang (月江), a calque of "Sông Trăng" (Moon River).

The name Sóc Trăng comes from the Khmer name of the area Srok Khleang (ស្រុកឃ្លាំង), which means Land of depositories or Place to store silver. The Vietnamese transliteration gave Sốc Kha Lang and later Sóc Trăng.

== Administrative divisions ==
Sóc Trăng City is divided into 10 administrative divisions numbered 1 to 10. The city borders Long Phú District in the east and north, Mỹ Tú District in the west and north, Châu Thành District in the west and Mỹ Xuyên District in the south.

== Population ==
Besides the majority Kinh people, there are also ethnic Chinese and a significant Khmer Krom minority in the city.

== Culture ==
50 of the 200 pagodas in Sóc Trăng Province are located in Sóc Trăng City. Some of the most famous ones are the Khmer Chùa Dơi (Bat Pagoda) and Chùa Đất Sét (Clay Pagoda), Chùa Phật nằm (Som Rong Pagoda).

Tan Long Stork Garden is known as an eco-destination in Soc Trang. People come to watch birds and walking in the thousands of storks.

== Transportation ==
Highway 1 connects the city to Cà Mau in the south, Cần Thơ, Ho Chi Minh City and cities further north. Regular buses run between these cities. Air travel is served by Can Tho International Airport located in Cần Thơ, which is approximately 60 km from the city's center.

== Climate ==
Climate data for Sóc Trăng
Month	Jan	Feb	Mar	Apr	May	Jun	Jul	Aug	Sep	Oct	Nov	Dec	Year
Record high °C (°F)	35.3 (95.5)	35.6 (96.1)	36.7 (98.1)	37.5 (99.5)	37.8 (100.0)	35.5 (95.9)	34.5 (94.1)	34.8 (94.6)	34.5 (94.1)	34.5 (94.1)	34.9 (94.8)	33.5 (92.3)	37.8 (100.0)
Mean daily maximum °C (°F)	30.3 (86.5)	31.2 (88.2)	32.6 (90.7)	33.9 (93.0)	33.0 (91.4)	31.8 (89.2)	31.2 (88.2)	31.1 (88.0)	31.0 (87.8)	30.8 (87.4)	30.6 (87.1)	29.9 (85.8)	31.5 (88.7)
Daily mean °C (°F)	25.3 (77.5)	26.0 (78.8)	27.3 (81.1)	28.5 (83.3)	28.1 (82.6)	27.4 (81.3)	27.1 (80.8)	26.9 (80.4)	26.8 (80.2)	26.8 (80.2)	26.6 (79.9)	25.7 (78.3)	26.9 (80.4)
Mean daily minimum °C (°F)	22.2 (72.0)	22.5 (72.5)	23.7 (74.7)	24.8 (76.6)	25.0 (77.0)	24.8 (76.6)	24.5 (76.1)	24.5 (76.1)	24.5 (76.1)	24.5 (76.1)	24.1 (75.4)	22.8 (73.0)	24.0 (75.2)
Record low °C (°F)	13.9 (57.0)	13.1 (55.6)	16.9 (62.4)	18.8 (65.8)	19.5 (67.1)	21.8 (71.2)	21.3 (70.3)	21.3 (70.3)	19.5 (67.1)	15.7 (60.3)	18.0 (64.4)	13.0 (55.4)	13.0 (55.4)
Average rainfall mm (inches)	7.7 (0.30)	3.5 (0.14)	13.8 (0.54)	62.3 (2.45)	234.0 (9.21)	268.0 (10.55)	261.8 (10.31)	286.8 (11.29)	284.8 (11.21)	308.6 (12.15)	137.1 (5.40)	36.6 (1.44)	1,904.8 (74.99)
Average rainy days	1.7	0.7	1.5	5.2	18.4	21.7	22.5	22.9	23.4	21.6	11.9	5.6	156.9
Average relative humidity (%)	79.5	78.3	77.5	78.3	84.0	86.6	87.1	87.5	88.2	87.6	85.2	82.4	83.5
Mean monthly sunshine hours	238.6	248.4	273.4	253.5	191.9	161.6	174.9	168.2	152.3	165.1	195.7	201.5	2,422.1
Source: Vietnam Institute for Building Science and Technology

== Notable people ==
- Lý Hoàng Sơn, professional basketball player
- Philipp Rösler, former Vice Chancellor of Germany, born in Sóc Trăng.
