= Trần Đề district =

Trần Đề district Huyện Trần Đề
- District
- Location within Vietnam
- Coordinates: 9°31′17″N 106°11′31″E
- Country: Vietnam
- Region: Mekong Delta
- Province: Sóc Trăng
- Capital: Trần Đề

Area
  - Total: 146.24 sq mi (378.76 km^{2})

Population (2009)
  - Total: 130,077
  - Density: 890/sq mi (343/km^{2})
- Time zone: UTC+7 (UTC + 7)

Trần Đề is a rural district (huyện) of Sóc Trăng province in the Mekong River Delta region of Vietnam. As of 2009 the district had a population of 130,077. The district covers an area of 378.76 km^{2} (146.24 sq mi). The district capital lies at Trần Đề.

Trần Đề district was established in 2009.

== Commune-level subdivisions ==
- Lịch Hội Thượng township
- Trần Đề township
- Lịch Hội Thượng commune
- Trung Bình
- Đại Ân 2
- Liêu Tú
- Thạnh Thới An
- Thạnh Thới Thuận
- Tài Văn
- Viên An
- Viên Bình
