= Phú Lợi =

Phú Lợi could be one of the following locations in Viet Nam:

- Phú Lợi, Ho Chi Minh City, ward in Ho Chi Minh City
- Phú Lợi, Cần Thơ, ward in Cần Thơ city
- Phu Loi Base Camp, former US Army base
