= Cổ Chiên Bridge =

Vietnamese bridge

Cổ Chiên Bridge Cầu Cổ Chiên
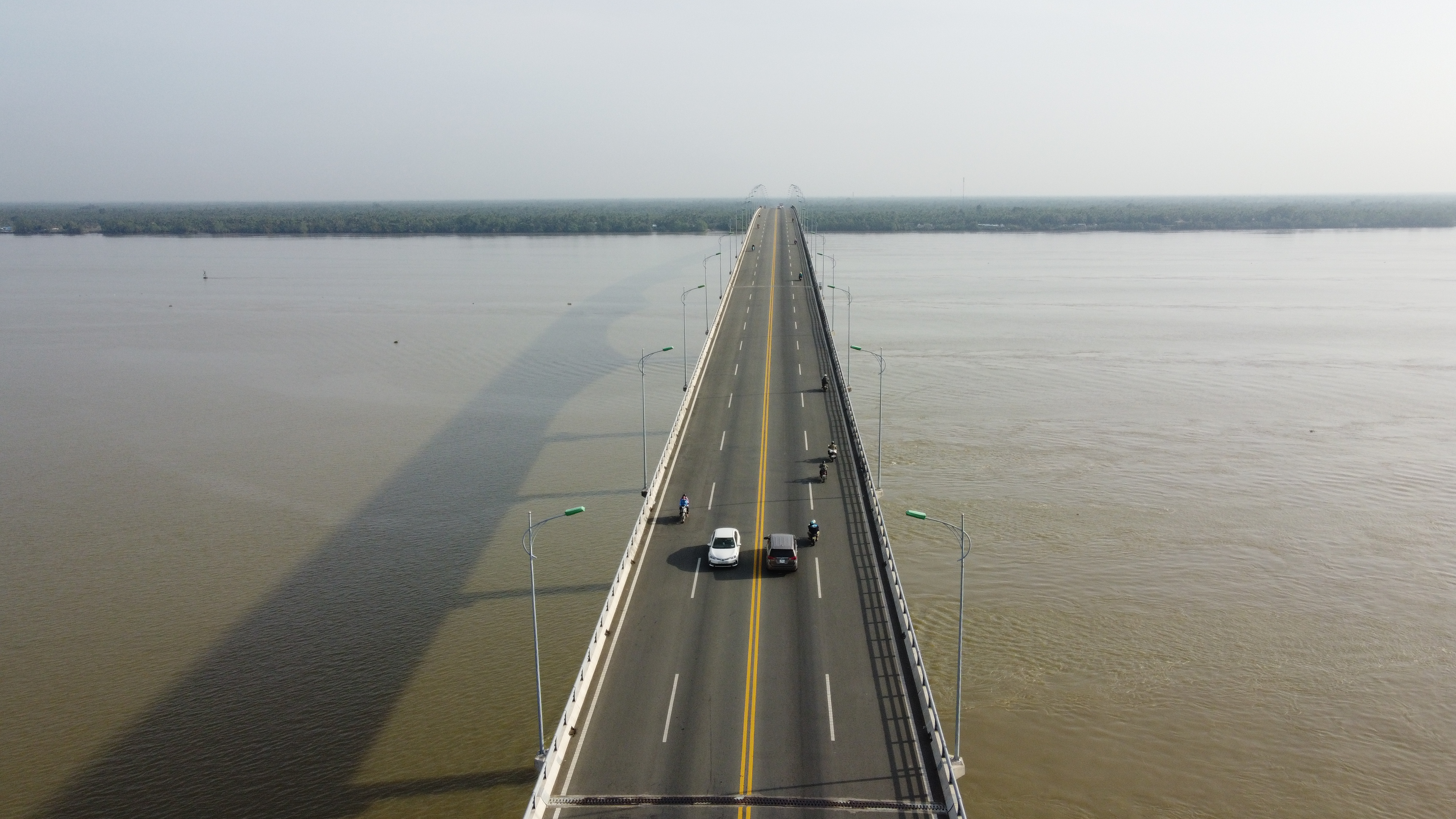
- Coordinates: 10.0287°N 106.3061°E
- Carries: Vehicles
- Crosses: Co Chien River
- Locale: Mekong Delta

Characteristics
- Material: Prestressed concrete, Reinforced Concrete
- Total length: 1,599 metres (5,246 ft)
- Width: 16 metres (52 ft)

History
- Inaugurated: 2015

Co Chien Bridge Vietnamese: Cầu Cổ Chiên) is a road bridge spanning the Cổ Chiên River in the Mekong Delta of Vietnam.

== Description ==
Co Chien Bridge is a cantilever bridge using prestressed concrete. It is 1,599 meters long and 16 meters wide, with four lanes of traffic with posted speeds of 80 kph. It crosses the Co Chien River connecting the Mo Cay Nam district of Ben Tre province with the Cang Long district of Tra Vinh Province along Vietnam's National Highway 60. It 3.6 kilometers downstream from the Co Chien Ferry Terminal that it was designed to supplement.

The architecture of the Co Chien Bridge consists prestressed reinforced concrete as well as reinforced concrete, using a balanced cantilever main span structure. The structure consists of 24 simple 40-meter spans using Super T girders.

== History ==
In 2011, Co Chien Bridge was chosen one of the four key projects prioritized as part of a larger effort to develop transportation infrastructure in the Mekong Delta and one of the key bridges of Vietnam's National Highway 60 (alongside the Rach Mieu, Ham Luong, and Dai Ngai bridges). It would be developed under the Build-operate-transfer model with a budget of 3,798 trillion VND. Construction began in 2013. In 2012, the bridge took a major pivot when it was decided to scrap plans for a cable-stayed bridge and opt for cantilever bridge, making for a major shift in the construction calendar and budget. The cantilever bridge was completed in 2015, after 21 months of construction and 15 months ahead of the schedule (not including work on the cable-stayed design) at a cost of 2.3 trillion VND(US$106.2 million)

== Effect ==
The bridge has decreased the travel distance between Tra Vinh and Ho Chi Minh City by 60 kilometers, compared to the route through Co Chien Ferry Terminal. Its opening has increased traffic to Tra Vinh Province, boosting tourism and land development. Additional roads have been planned to feed into the bridge, which have stalled due to a dearth of sand for construction in the region. By 2017, the increase in traffic has also seen an increase of potholes in the roads leading to the bridge.
