= Sóc Trăng, Cần Thơ =

Ward in Cần Thơ city, Vietnam

Sóc Trăng
- Ward
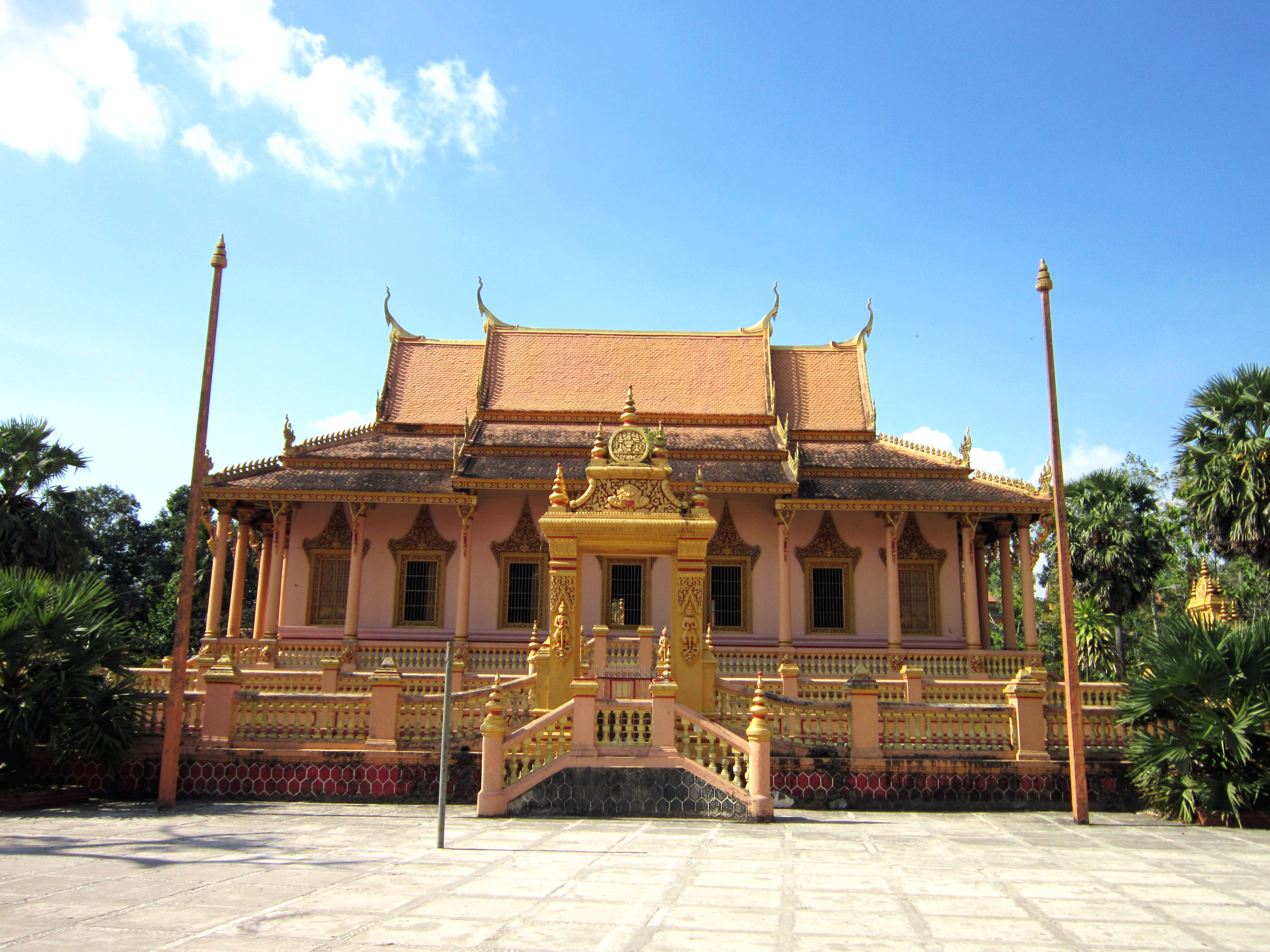
- Khmer Kh'Leang Pagoda
- Country: Vietnam
- Centrally- governed city: Cần Thơ
- Establish: June 16, 2025

Area
  - Total: 41.67 km^{2} (16.09 sq mi)

Population (2025)
  - Total: 61,253 people
  - Density: 1,470/km^{2} (3,807/sq mi)
- Time zone: UTC+07:00

Sóc Trăng is a ward in Cần Thơ city, Vietnam. It is one of 103 communes and wards in the city following the 2025 reorganization.

Prior to 2025, Sóc Trăng was the name of a province and provincial city (capital of the province same name) in Vietnam.

== Geography ==
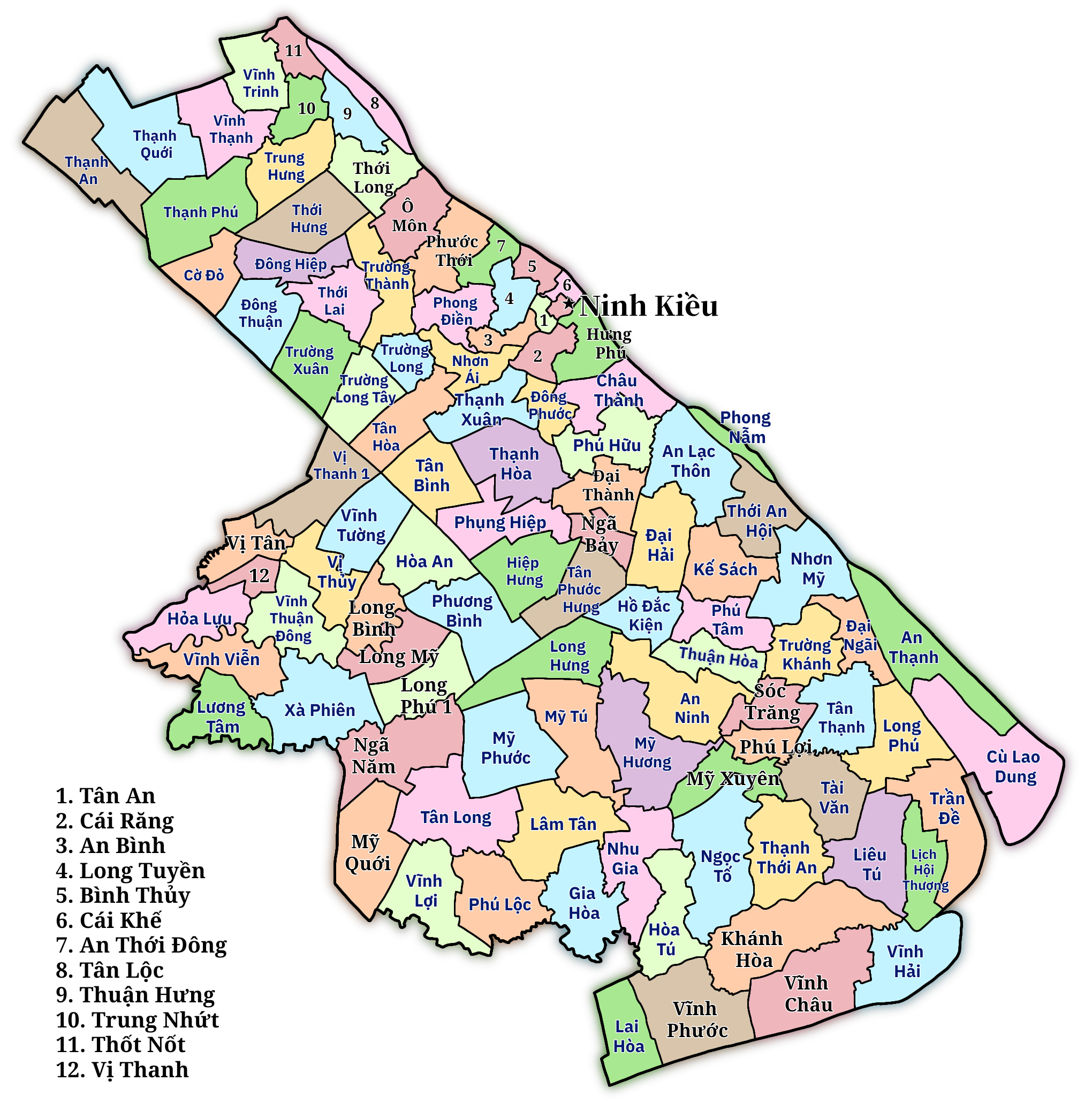
Location of Sóc Trăng ward on Cần Thơ city administrative map.

Sóc Trăng is a ward located in the south of Cần Thơ city. It border with Phú Lợi ward to the south, An Ninh commune to the west, Thuận Hòa and Trường Khánh communes to the north and Tân Thạnh commune to the east.

== History ==
Prior to 2025, Sóc Trăng ward consisted of wards 5, 6, 7, and 8 of Sóc Trăng provincial city, Sóc Trăng province.

On June 12, 2025, the National Assembly of Vietnam issued Resolution No. 202/2025/QH15 on the reorganization of provincial-level administrative units. Accordingly:

- Cần Thơ city was established by merging the entire area and population of Cần Thơ city, Hậu Giang province, and Sóc Trăng province.

On June 16, 2025, the Standing Committee of the National Assembly of Vietnam issued Resolution No. 1668/NQ-UBTVQH15 on the reorganization of commune-level administrative in Cần Thơ city. Accordingly:

- Sóc Trăng ward was established by merging the entire area and population of wards 5, 6, 7, and 8 (formerly part of Sóc Trăng provincial city).

== Tourism ==
Sóc Trăng ward has potential for tourism development thanks to its numerous historical sites, religious buildings, and cultural values characteristic of the Khmer, Việt and Hoa communities in the Mekong Delta. Notable tourist attractions in the ward include Dơi Pagoda, Kh'Leang Temple, Đất Sét Pagoda, and the Sóc Trăng Museum. Traditional festivals of the Khmer people, particularly the Ok Om Bok Festival, also contribute to the area's tourism appeal.

Local cuisine, including specialties such as bún nước lèo, bánh cống, and bánh pía, is an important part of tourism in the ward.

== Transport ==
Sóc Trăng ward has a relatively developed transport network, serving as an important transportation hub in the southern part of Cần Thơ. The ward is connected to surrounding areas by major roads, facilitating travel and the transportation of goods. The National Route 1 passes through the area, providing connections with other localities in the Mekong Delta.

The urban road network within the ward connects residential areas, commercial areas and important administrative and cultural facilities, contributing to the development of trade, services and tourism.
