= Sóc Trăng (disambiguation) =

Sóc Trăng is a ward of Cần Thơ city

Sóc Trăng may also refer to the following places in Vietnam:

- Sóc Trăng (city), former city of Sóc Trăng province
- Sóc Trăng province, former province of Vietnam
