= Duyên Hải district =

Coordinates: 9.583°N 106.417°E

Duyên Hải district Huyện Duyên Hải
- District
- Interactive map of Duyên Hải district
- Country: Vietnam
- Region: Mekong Delta
- Province: Trà Vinh
- Capital: Long Thành

Area
  - Total: 116.01 sq mi (300.47 km^{2})

Population (2018)
  - Total: 84,925
- Time zone: UTC+7 (UTC + 7)

Duyên Hải is a rural district (huyện) of Trà Vinh province in the Mekong Delta region of Vietnam. As of 2015 the district had a population of 82,393. The district covers an area of 300.47 km^{2} (116.01 sq mi). The district capital lies at Long Thành town. The town of Duyên Hải was separated from the district in 2015.

== Geography ==
It is located in the south of Tra Vinh province, next to Dinh An estuary of Hậu River. The east borders Duyên Hải Town, the north with Tra Cu District, the west with Cu Lao Dung District.
