= Duyên Hải (town) =

District-level town of Trà Vinh Province in the Mekong Delta region of Vietnam

Coordinates: 9°37′59″N 106°29′51″E

- District-level town (Class-4)
- Duyên Hải Town; Thị xã Duyên Hải
- Seal
- Interactive map of Duyên Hải
- Location within Vietnam Location within Southeast Asia Location within Asia
- Country: Vietnam
- Region: Mekong Delta
- Province: Trà Vinh
- Capital: Duyên Hải

Area
  - District-level town (Class-4): 67.59 sq mi (175.07 km^{2})
  - Urban: 9.67 sq mi (25.04 km^{2})

Population (2019)
  - District-level town (Class-4): 48,210
  - Density: 710/sq mi (275/km^{2})
  - Urban: 15,557
  - Urban density: 1,609/sq mi (621.3/km^{2})
- Time zone: UTC+7 (UTC + 7)

Duyên Hải is a district-level town of Trà Vinh Province in the Mekong Delta region of Vietnam. The town was separated from Duyên Hải District in 2015.

== Geography ==
The town is located in the southeast of Trà Vinh province, next to Cung Hau estuary of Cổ Chiên River. The east and south border the South China Sea, the north borders with Cầu Ngang district and the west with Duyên Hải district.

The town have an overall natural land area is 193.400 m^{2}, its terrain is mostly low and flat. Average height falls in 0.4 to 1.2m. Main minerals of the town are mineral water and black sand.
