= Mỹ Xuyên =

Ward in Cần Thơ city, Vietnam

- Ward
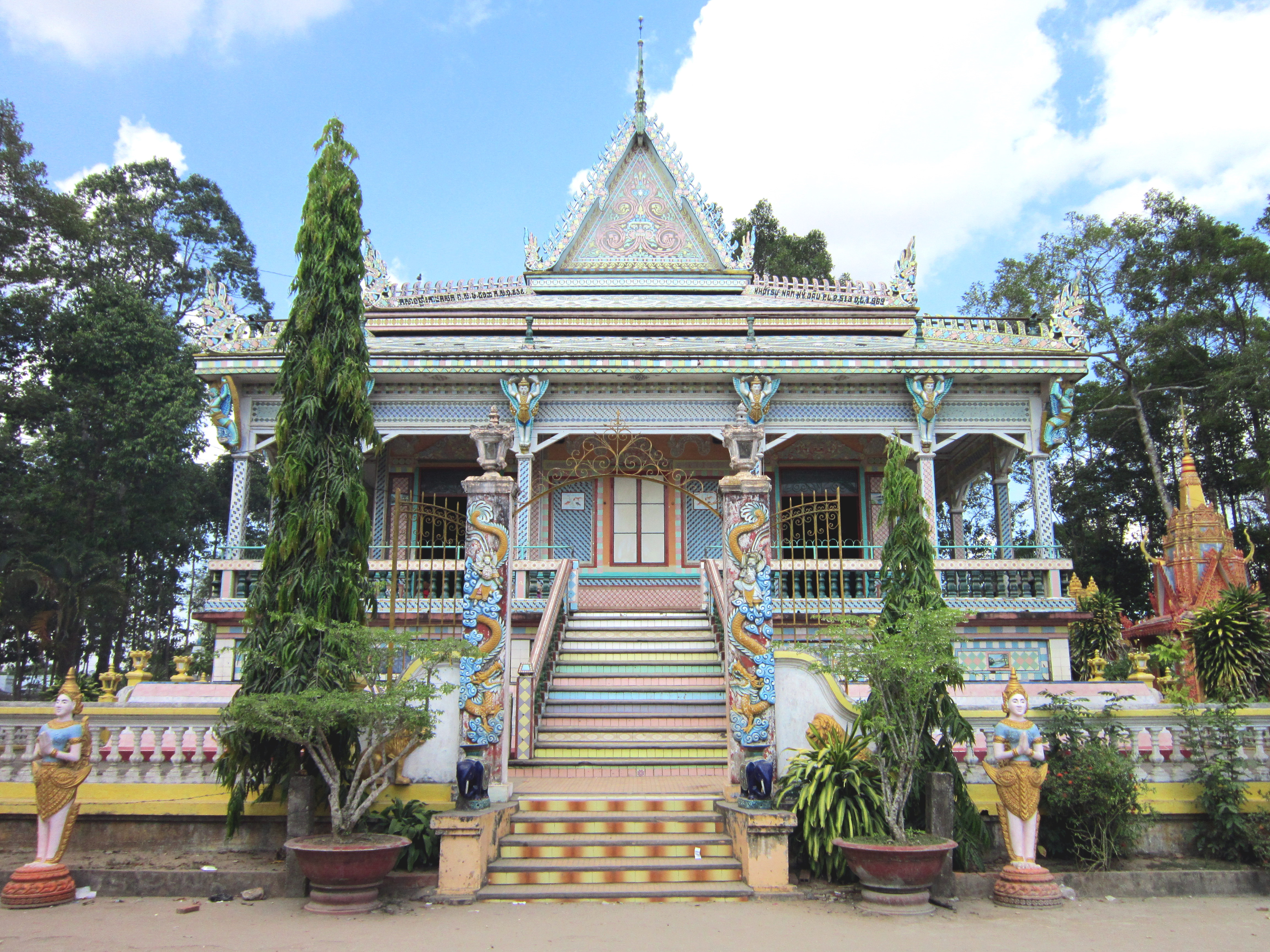
- Sà Lôn pagoda (Chén Kiểu pagoda)
- Interactive map of Mỹ Xuyên
- Country: Vietnam
- Region: Mekong Delta
- Centrally- governed city: Cần Thơ
- Established: June 16, 2025

Government
  - Type: Ward
  - Body: People's Council of Mỹ Xuyên ward

Area
  - Total: 48.34 km^{2} (18.66 sq mi)

Population (2025)
  - Total: 51,769 people
  - Density: 1,071/km^{2} (2,774/sq mi)
- Time zone: UTC+07:00

Mỹ Xuyên is a ward in Cần Thơ city, Vietnam. It is one of 103 communes and wards in the city after following the 2025 reorganization.

== Geography ==
Location of Mỹ Xuyên ward on Cần Thơ city map.

Mỹ Xuyên is a ward located in the southern part of Cần Thơ city. It borders Nhu Gia, Ngọc Tố and Thạnh Thới An communes to the south; Tài Văn commune to the east; Phú Lợi ward to the north and Mỹ Hương commune to the west.

== History ==
Prior to 2025, Mỹ Xuyên ward was formerly ward 10 (belonging to Sóc Trăng provincial city) and Mỹ Xuyên commune-level town, Đại Tâm commune (belonging to Mỹ Xuyên district), all belonging to Sóc Trăng province.

On June 12, 2025, the National Assembly of Vietnam issued Resolution No. 202/2025/QH15 on the reorganization of provincial-level administrative units. Cần Thơ city was established by merging the entire area and population of Cần Thơ city, Hậu Giang and Sóc Trăng provinces.

On June 16, 2025, the Standing Committee of the National Assembly of Vietnam issued Resolution No. 1663/NQ-UBTVQH15 on the reorganization of commune-level administrative units in Cần Thơ city. Mỹ Xuyên ward was established by merging the entire area and population of Ward 10 (formerly part of Sóc Trăng provincial city) and Mỹ Xuyên commune-level town, and Đại Tâm commune (formerly part of Mỹ Xuyên district).
