= Thanh Tri =

Thanh Tri may refer to several places in Vietnam:

== Thanh Trì ==
- Thanh Trì District, a rural district of Hanoi
- Thanh Trì (ward), a ward of Hoàng Mai District, Hanoi
- Thanh Trì Bridge

== Thạnh Trị ==
- Thạnh Trị District, a rural district of Sóc Trăng Province
