= Cù Lao Dung district =

Coordinates: 10°02′21″N 105°46′54″E

Cù Lao Dung district Huyện Cù Lao Dung
- District
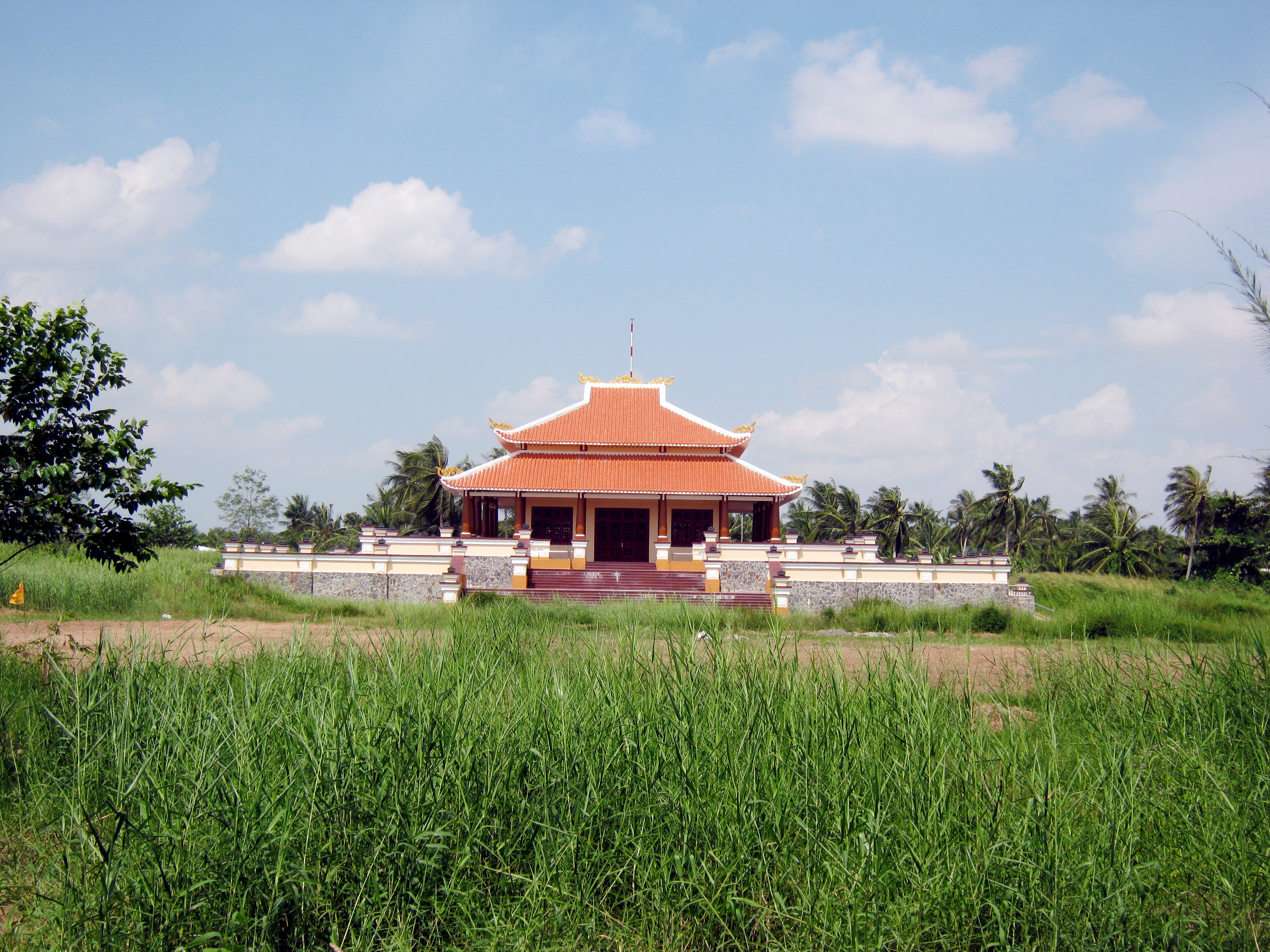
- Uncle Ho Temple in Den Den hamlet. The temple was built in 1970 and has been restored.
- Interactive map of Cù Lao Dung district
- Country: Vietnam
- Region: Mekong Delta
- Province: Sóc Trăng
- Capital: Cù Lao Dung

Area
  - Total: 91 sq mi (235 km^{2})

Population (2003)
  - Total: 62,025
  - Density: 870/sq mi (334/km^{2})
- Time zone: UTC+7 (UTC + 7)

Cù Lao Dung is a rural district (huyện) of Sóc Trăng province in the Mekong River Delta region of Vietnam. As of 2003 the district had a population of 62,025. The district covers an area of 235 km^{2}. The district capital lies at Cù Lao Dung.
