= Phú Long (disambiguation) =

Phú Long may refer to several places in Vietnam, including:

- Phú Long, a commune of Ninh Bình province
- Phú Long, Bình Thuận, a former township of Hàm Thuận Bắc district
- Phú Long, Bến Tre, a former commune of Bình Đại district
- Phú Long, Đồng Tháp, a former commune of Châu Thành district, Đồng Tháp
- Phú Long, Ninh Bình, a former commune of Nho Quan district
- Phú Long, An Giang, a former commune of Phú Tân district, An Giang
