= Ngã Năm =

- Ward
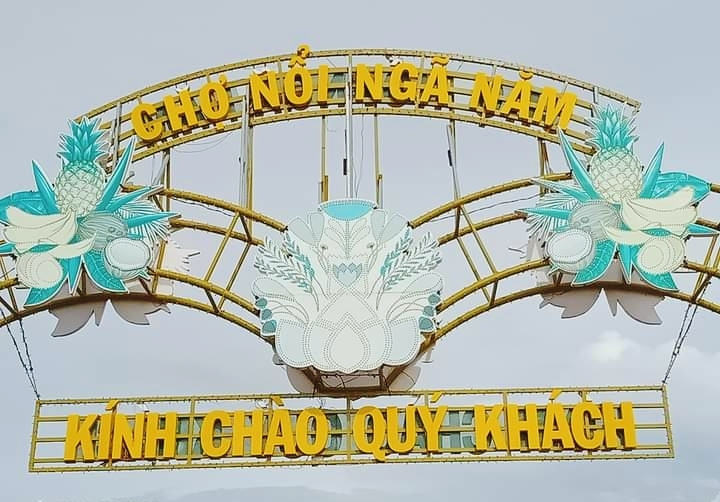
- Ngã Năm floating market
- Interactive map of Ngã Năm
- Coordinates: 9.565782293226853°N 105.60505613879863°E
- Country: Vietnam
- Municipality: Cần Thơ
- Region: Mekong Delta
- Established: 16 June 2025
- Seat: 22 Nguyễn Văn Linh, Khu vực 3

Area
  - Total: 95.30 km^{2} (36.80 sq mi)

Population (31 December 2024)
  - Total: 58,588
  - Density: 614/km^{2} (1,590/sq mi)
- Website: nganam.cantho.gov.vn

Ngã Năm is a ward in Cần Thơ, Vietnam.

On 12 June 2025, the National Assembly of Vietnam adopted Resolution No. 202/2025/QH15 on the reorganization of provincial-level administrative units, which took effect on the same date. Under the resolution, Hậu Giang province and Sóc Trăng province were merged into Cần Thơ.

On 16 June 2025, the National Assembly adopted Resolution No. 203/2025/QH15 on amendments and supplements to several articles of the Constitution of the Socialist Republic of Vietnam. Under the resolution, district-level administrative units nationwide ceased operations from 1 July 2025.

Also on 16 June 2025, the Standing Committee of the National Assembly of Vietnam adopted Resolution No. 1668/NQ-UBTVQH15 on the reorganization of commune-level administrative units in Cần Thơ in 2025, which took effect on the same date. Under the resolution, Ngã Năm ward was established in Cần Thơ from the entire area and population of Ward 1, comprising 19.52 km² and 19,875 people; Ward 2, comprising 44.78 km² and 23,787 people; and Vĩnh Quới commune, comprising 31.00 km² and 14,926 people, all in the former Ngã Năm town, Sóc Trăng province.
