= Khleang Temple =

Coordinates: 9.61016°N 105.97679°E

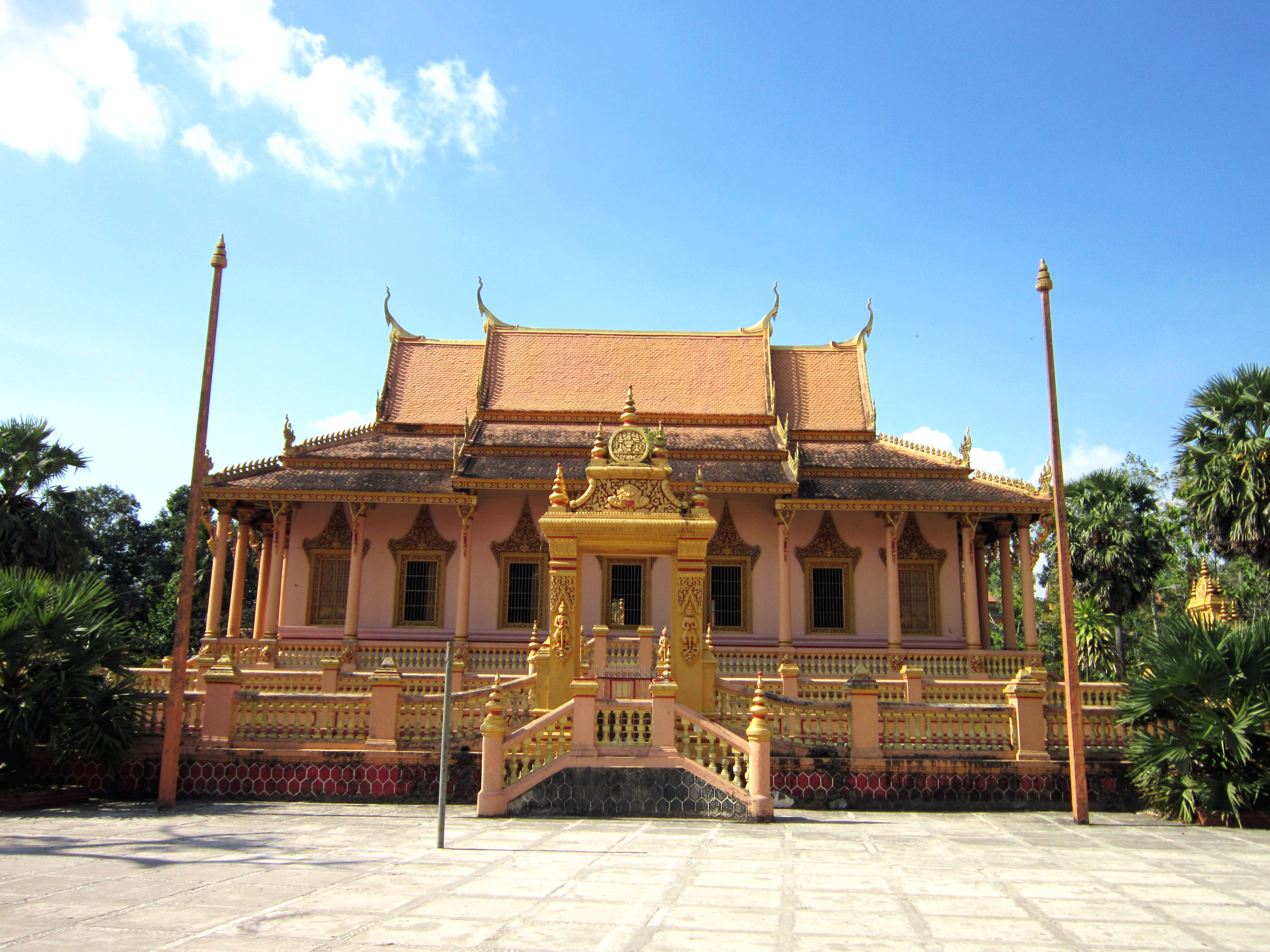
Khleang Temple

Khleang Temple (Khmer: វត្តឃ្លាំង [ʋŏət kʰlĕəŋ]; Vietnamese: Chùa Khléang) is a notable Theravada Buddhist temple in Sóc Trăng, a city in the Mekong Delta region of southern Vietnam known for its large Khmer Krom population.

== Description ==
The temple is situated on a 3.5-hectare (8.6-acre) block of land that is marked by a large number of high and shady trees. The temple was first built in 1533, when the area was under the control of the Khmer Empire, before the area was taken over by Vietnamese settlers in the 17th and 18th centuries. It initially consisted of a wooden building with a thatched roof, before being replaced with a tiled roof. There are four entrances for the temple, in the northern, southern, eastern and western directions. The temple has been renovated many times in the five centuries since its construction but has not been renovated in the last 80 years. From the first abbot Thích Thạch Sóc to the current abbot, there have been 21 abbots.

The main ceremonial hall occupies an area of 416 m; it is 20 m wide and 20.80 m long. It stands on an elevated platform around a metre above ground level. The roof is held up by 12 wide pillars built in the Corinthian style of Greece. It is painted in shiny black coating, with gold coloured paintings of dragons and fish wrapping themselves around the pillar. A placard stands in front of the main altar and lengthens to the ceiling of the main hall, with inscriptions in gold paint. At the centre of the main hall is the statue of Gautama Buddha, which stands 6.80 m high and 2.70 m wide. A plaque with a Khmer inscription denotes that the 17th abbot of the temple organised the erection of the statue in 1916, funded by the family of Lum Sum.

The temple is ornamented with various objects in the Khmer tradition.

== Krud ==
Krud or Garuda is a representation of god with a bird's head and wings and a human body. The bird's beak holds a piece of jade. This type of bird is depicted as the eternal enemy of the snake. The Krud is depicted biting the tail of a snake on the ornaments of the temple roof.

== Yeak ==
In Khmer folklore, Yeak is the representation of evil, and is usually depicting causing trouble to living beings. It is often depicted by a human with a fiery face, large mouth, long canine teeth, bulging eyes, wearing a suit of armour, sherp-pointed helmet and a long pike. Two statues of Yeak are placed at either side of the temple to represent the defeat of evil by the Buddha and the conversion of Yeak into a protector of Buddhism.

Two statues of Reach Cha Sei stand on either side of the entrance. This is a creature on which a female god and Yeak stood when they engaged in combat. A statue of Teahu, depicted as an angry, vicious person, who has the sun and moon is hand, in preparation for swallowing. It also stands at the entrance.

The temple grounds contain six stupas, in which the cremated remains of various monks and laypeople are enshrined. The temple was declared a historic heritage site by the Culture Ministry on April 27, 1990.
