= Trà Cú district =

Coordinates: 9.667°N 106.333°E

Trà Cú district Huyện Trà Cú
- District
- Interactive map of Trà Cú district
- Country: Vietnam
- Region: Mekong Delta
- Province: Trà Vinh province
- Capital: Trà Cú

Area
  - Total: 142 sq mi (368 km^{2})

Population (2003)
  - Total: 167,637
- Time zone: UTC+7 (UTC + 7)

Trà Cú is a rural district (huyện) of Trà Vinh province in the Mekong Delta region of Vietnam. As of 2003, the district had a population of 167,637. The district covers an area of 368 km^{2}. The district capital is Trà Cú.
