= Phú Lợi, Cần Thơ =

Ward in Cần Thơ city, Vietnam

Phú Lợi
- Ward
- A view in Phú Lợi ward
- Country: Vietnam
- Region: Mekong Delta
- Centrally-governed city: Cần Thơ
- Established: June 16, 2025

Government
  - Type: Ward
  - Body: People's Council of Phú Lợi ward

Area
  - Total: 26.79 km^{2} (10.34 sq mi)

Population (2025)
  - Total: 95,516
  - Density: 3,565/km^{2} (9,234/sq mi)
- Time zone: UTC+07:00

Phú Lợi is a ward in Cần Thơ city, Vietnam. It is one of 103 wards and communes in the city. Prior to 2025, Phú Lợi ward was part of Sóc Trăng - provincial city and capital of the former province of the same name. The ward has an area of 26.79 km² and a projected population of 95,516 people in 2025.

== Geography ==
Location of Phú Lợi ward in Cần Thơ city.

Phú Lợi is a ward located in the southern part of Cần Thơ city. It borders with Sóc Trăng ward to the north and northwest; Mỹ Xuyên to the south and southwest; Tài Văn and Tân Thạnh to the east.

== Subdivisions ==
Phú Lợi ward is divided into 15 neighborhoods: Bắc Tà Ky, Chợ Trung tâm, Cầu Bon, Chùa Dơi, Cổng Đỏ, Cổng Xanh, Đô Thị 5A, Đồng Tiến, Khánh Hưng, Mỹ Phương, Phú Lợi, Quản Khuôn, Sung Đinh, Thuận Hóa, Tiểu đoàn Tây đô.

== History ==
Prior to 2025, the area of Phú Lợi ward was formerly wards 1, 2, 3, and 4 of Sóc Trăng provincial city, Sóc Trăng province.

On June 12, 2025, Hậu Giang and Sóc Trăng provinces will be merged into Cần Thơ city.

On June 16, 2025, the Standing Committee of the National Assembly of Vietnam issued Resolution No. 1668/NQ-UBTVQH15 on the reorganization of commune-level administrative units in Cần Thơ city. Phú Lợi ward was established by merging the entire area and population of wards 1, 2, 3 and 4 (formerly part of Sóc Trăng provincial city).

== Economy ==
The economy of Phú Lợi ward is primarily based on commerce and services, industry, and handicrafts. It is an area with well-developed business and trading activities in Cần Thơ, featuring a network of markets, commercial establishments, and numerous businesses.

Commerce and services play a leading role in the local economic structure. In addition, industry and handicrafts have also developed, particularly in food processing and goods production. The ward also promotes products under the 'One Commune One Product' (OCOP) programme, including: rice, bánh pía, bánh phồng tôm, and lạp xưởng.

In recent years, the ward has promoted digital transformation in business activities, implementing the Phú Lợi Digital Market model and initiatives to promote OCOP products through e-commerce, thereby expanding markets and fostering the digital economy.

== Society ==
Phú Lợi Ward has a diverse social structure, with its population consisting primarily of three ethnic groups: Việt, Khmer and Hoa. Their coexistence has created distinctive cultural characteristics in local customs, traditions, and religious practices.

The educational system is relatively well-developed, with 13 schools meeting national standards, helping to meet the educational needs of local residents. Community healthcare has received considerable attention, with more than 96% of residents participating in health insurance. Residents' living standards have gradually improved. The poverty rate has fallen below 1%, while nearly 97% of households have been recognised as Cultural Families.

== Culture ==
Phú Lợi Ward has a diverse cultural life, deeply rooted in the cultural traditions of southern Vietnam. It is a place where the cultures of three ethnic groups: Việt, Khmer, and Hoa — interact. This diversity is reflected in its architecture, religious practices, customs, traditional festivals, and local cuisine.

Khmer culture has a prominent influence on the spiritual life of the local population, particularly through its Khmer pagodas, which are notable for their architectural and artistic value. Prominent examples include Kh'leang pagoda, Dơi pagoda (Mahatup), and Peam Buôl Thmây pagoda. These pagodas serve not only as places of worship but also as important institutions for preserving the traditional cultural heritage of the Khmer community.

Traditional festivals are held annually, notably Chol Chnam Thmay, Ok Om Bok, and Sene Dolta, celebrated by the Khmer community. In addition, the cultural and religious activities of the Kinh and Hoa communities contribute to the diversity of local cultural life.
