= Thạnh Trị district =

Coordinates: 10°02′21″N 105°46′54″E

Thạnh Trị district Huyện Thạnh Trị
- District
- Interactive map of Thạnh Trị district
- Country: Vietnam
- Region: Mekong Delta
- Province: Sóc Trăng
- Capital: Phú Lộc

Area
  - Total: 108 sq mi (281 km^{2})

Population (2003)
  - Total: 86,262
- Time zone: UTC+7 (UTC + 7)

Thạnh Trị is a former district (huyện) of Sóc Trăng province in the Mekong River Delta region of Vietnam. As of 2003 the district had a population of 86,262. The district covers an area of 281 km^{2} (108 sq mi). The district capital lies at Phú Lộc.
