= Mỹ Xuyên district =

Coordinates: 9.417°N 105.783°E

Mỹ Xuyên district Huyện Mỹ Xuyên
- District
- Interactive map of Mỹ Xuyên district
- Country: Vietnam
- Region: Mekong Delta
- Province: Sóc Trăng
- Capital: Mỹ Xuyên

Area
  - Total: 210 sq mi (544 km^{2})

Population (2004)
  - Total: 197,876
- Time zone: UTC+7 (UTC + 7)

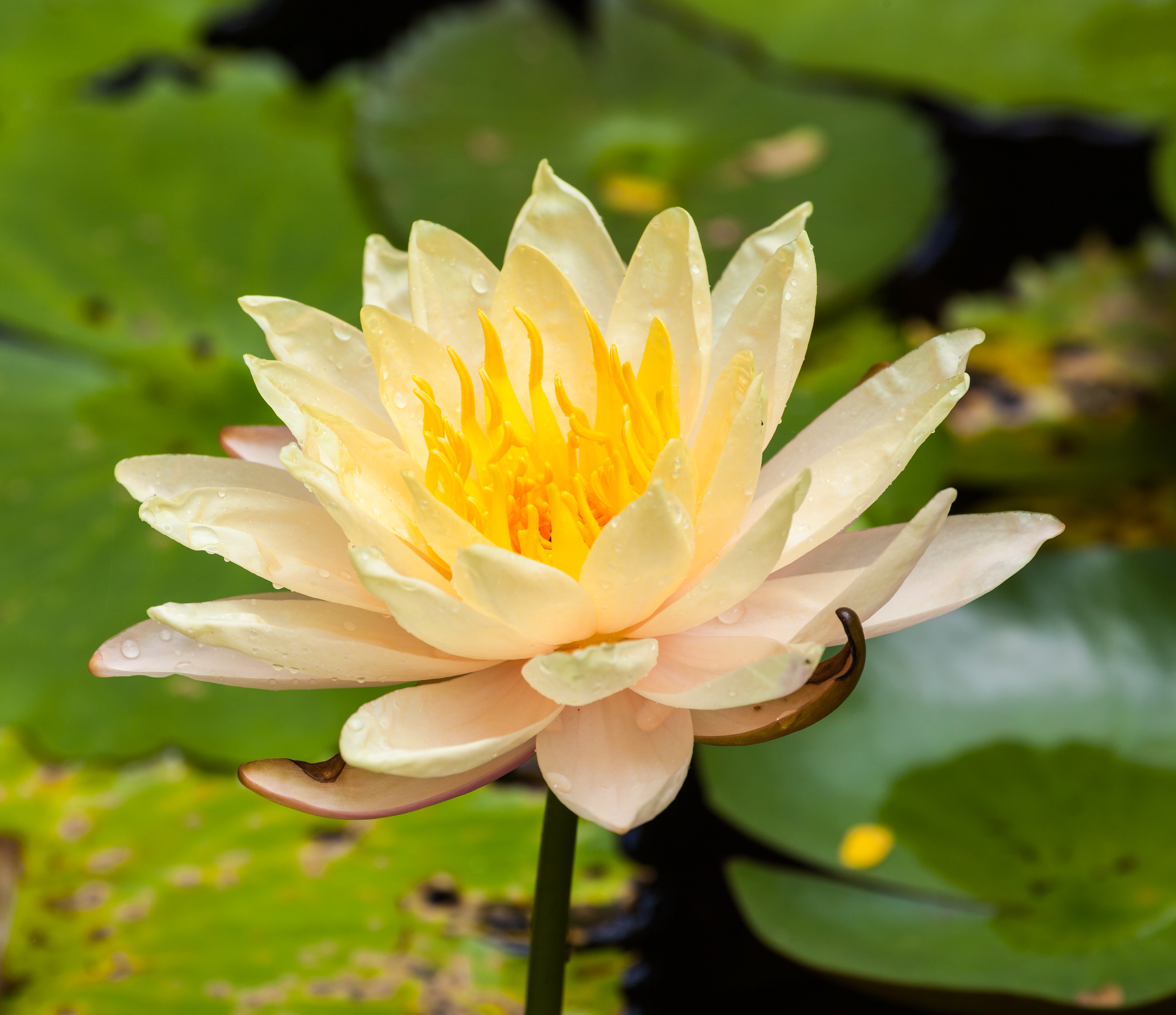

Mỹ Xuyên is a rural district (huyện) of Sóc Trăng province in the Mekong Delta region of Vietnam. As of 2003 the district had a population of 197,876. The district covers an area of 544 km^{2}. The district capital lies at Mỹ Xuyên.
