= Duyên Hải =

- Ward
- A section of the Hàn Quốc–Trà Vinh V1-1 wind farm in Vĩnh Long province
- Interactive map of Duyên Hải
- Coordinates: 9.6373988°N 106.4963381°E
- Country: Vietnam
- Province: Vĩnh Long
- Region: Mekong Delta
- Established: 16 June 2025
- Seat: No. 14, 3/2 Street, Khóm Long Toàn

Area
  - Total: 69.63 km^{2} (26.88 sq mi)

Population (31 December 2024)
  - Total: 24,356
  - Density: 349/km^{2} (900/sq mi)
- Website: duyenhai.vinhlong.gov.vn

Duyên Hải is a ward in Vĩnh Long province, Vietnam.

On 16 June 2025, the Standing Committee of the National Assembly of Vietnam adopted Resolution No. 1687/NQ-UBTVQH15 on the reorganization of commune-level administrative units in Vĩnh Long province. Under the resolution, the entire area and population of Ward 1, Long Toàn commune, and Dân Thành commune were consolidated to form a new ward named Duyên Hải.
