= Cổ Chiên River =

River in Vietnam

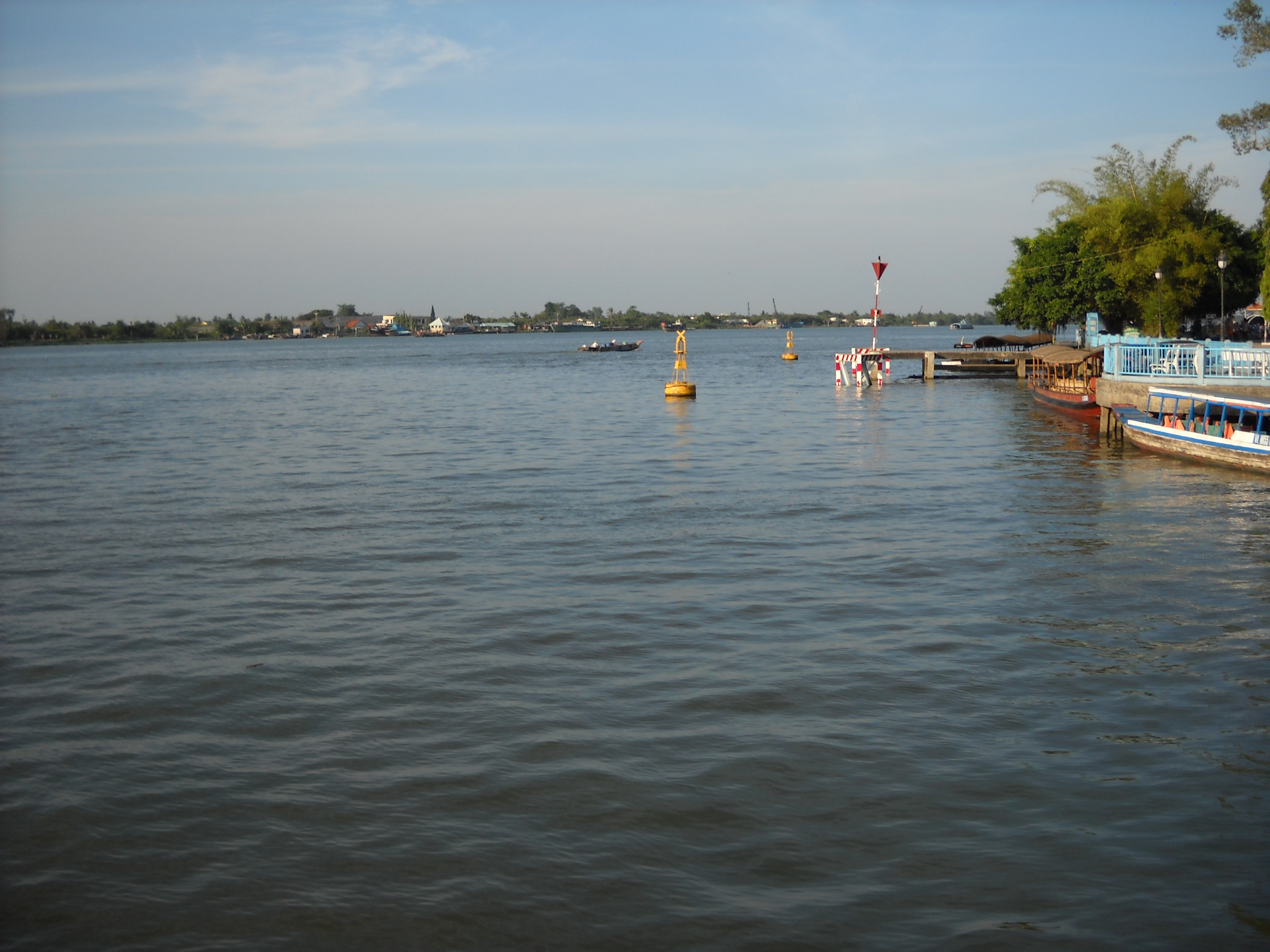
- Cổ Chiên River, passing through Vĩnh Long City
- Native name: Sông Cổ Chiên

Location
- Country: Vietnam
- Provinces: Vĩnh Long; Trà Vinh; Bến Tre

Physical characteristics
- Source: Tiền River
  - location: Tân Ngãi Ward, Vĩnh Long City, Vĩnh Long province, Vietnam
- Mouth: South China Sea
  - location: Long Hòa commune, Châu Thành district, Trà Vinh province, Vietnam
- Length: 82 km (51 mi)

The Cổ Chiên River (Vietnamese: Sông Cổ Chiên) is a river of Vietnam. It flows for 82 kilometres through Bến Tre Province, Trà Vinh Province and Vĩnh Long Province.
