= Trà Cú =

Trà Cú Xã Trà Cú
- Commune
- Trà Cú commune
- Location within Vietnam
- Coordinates: 9°41′18″N 106°15′40″E
- Country: Vietnam
- Region: Mekong Delta
- Province: Vĩnh Long
- Time zone: UTC+7 (UTC + 7)

Trà Cú is a commune (xã) of Vĩnh Long Province, Vietnam.
