= Trà Vinh province =

Former province of Vietnam

Trà Vinh ព្រះត្រពាំង (Khmer) Vĩnh Bình
- Province
- Trà Vinh province
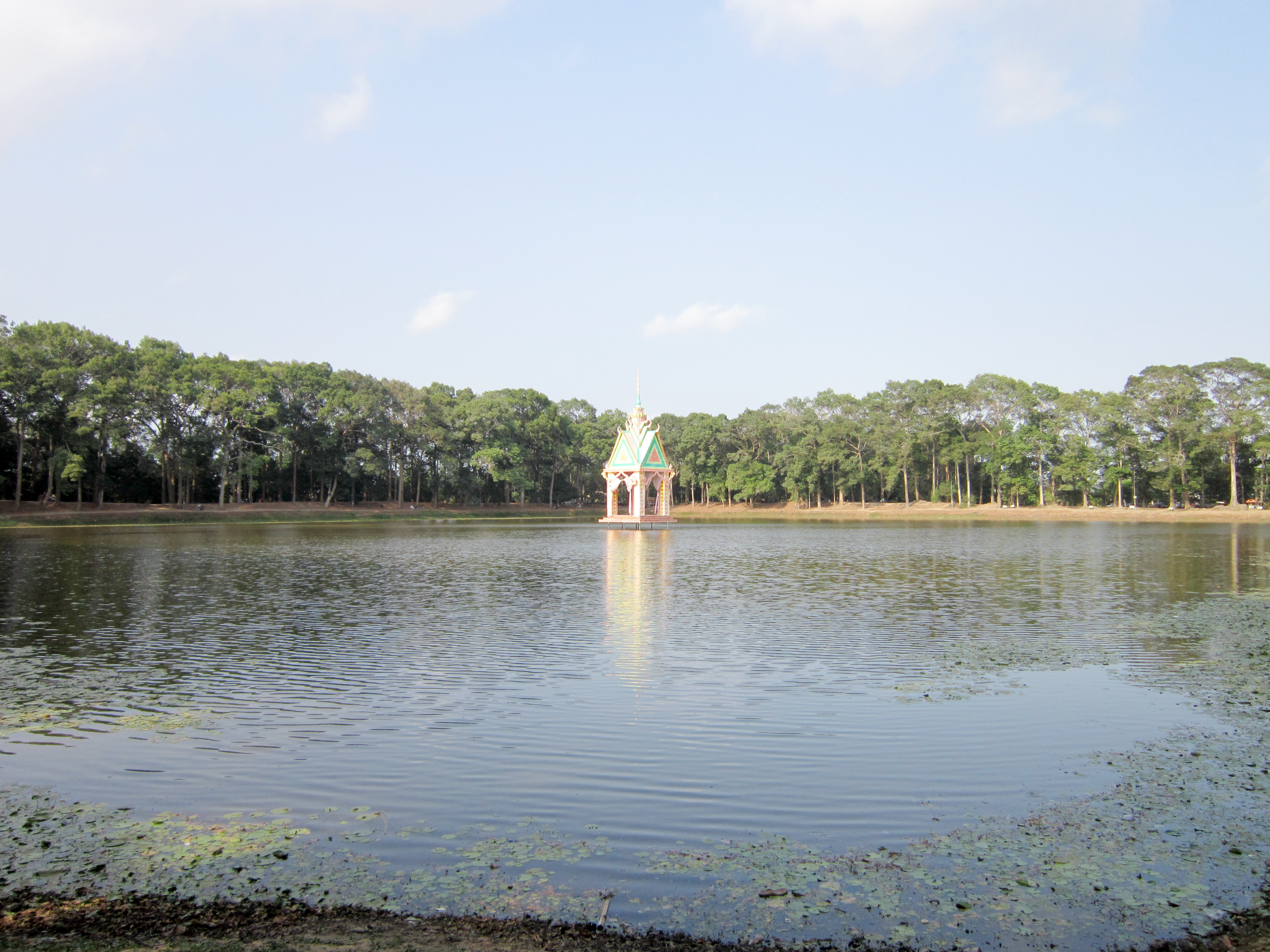

- Seal

- Location of Trà Vinh within Vietnam
- Coordinates: 9°50′N 106°15′E
- Country: Vietnam
- Region: Mekong Delta
- Capital: Trà Vinh

Government
  - People's Council Chair: Lê Văn Hẳn
  - People's Committee Chair: Kim Ngọc Thái

Area
  - Total: 2,390.77 km^{2} (923.08 sq mi)

Population (2025)
  - Total: 1,285,108
  - Density: 537.529/km^{2} (1,392.19/sq mi)

Demographics
  - Ethnicities: Vietnamese (68.35%); Khmer (30.00%); Hoa (1.65%)

GDP
  - Total: VND 45.778 trillion US$ 2.006 billion
- Time zone: UTC+07:00 (ICT)
- Area codes: 294
- ISO 3166 code: VN-51
- HDI (2020): ▲0.693 (42th)
- Website: www.travinh.gov.vn

Trà Vinh (Khmer: ព្រះត្រពាំង) was a former province in the Mekong Delta region of Southern Vietnam. The capital is Trà Vinh City. It was dissolved and merged with Vĩnh Long province on 12 June 2025.

== Etymology ==
Trà Vang was an old name used for this area, a hinterland with a sparse population.

In 1825, the area of Trà Vinh was established by King Minh Mạng into Lạc Hóa district also known as chà-văng or chà-vinh.

In 1951, the name Vĩnh Trà appeared, a combination of Vĩnh from Vĩnh Long and Trà from Trà Vinh.

The name was changed again from Trà Vinh to Vĩnh Bình province in 1957.

In 1976, Cửu Long province came to be by merging Vĩnh Long province and Trà Vinh.

The name Trà Vinh comes from the Khmer name of the area ព្រះត្រពាំង Preah Trapeang, which means Sacred pond or Buddha's pond. The Vietnamese transliteration gave Trà Vang and later Trà Vinh.

== Demographics ==
Besides more than two thirds of Trà Vinh's population being Vietnamese, nearly a third of the population is Khmer Krom. Trà Vinh also has one of the largest ethnic Hoa (Chinese) communities in Vietnam (1.65%).

== Administrative divisions ==
Trà Vinh is subdivided into nine district-level sub-divisions:

- 7 districts:
  - Càng Long
  - Cầu Kè
  - Cầu Ngang
  - Châu Thành
  - Duyên Hải
  - Tiểu Cần
  - Trà Cú
- 1 district-level town:
  - Duyên Hải
- 1 provincial city:
  - Trà Vinh (capital)

They are further subdivided into 11 commune-level towns (or townlets), 85 communes, and nine wards.

== Gallery ==
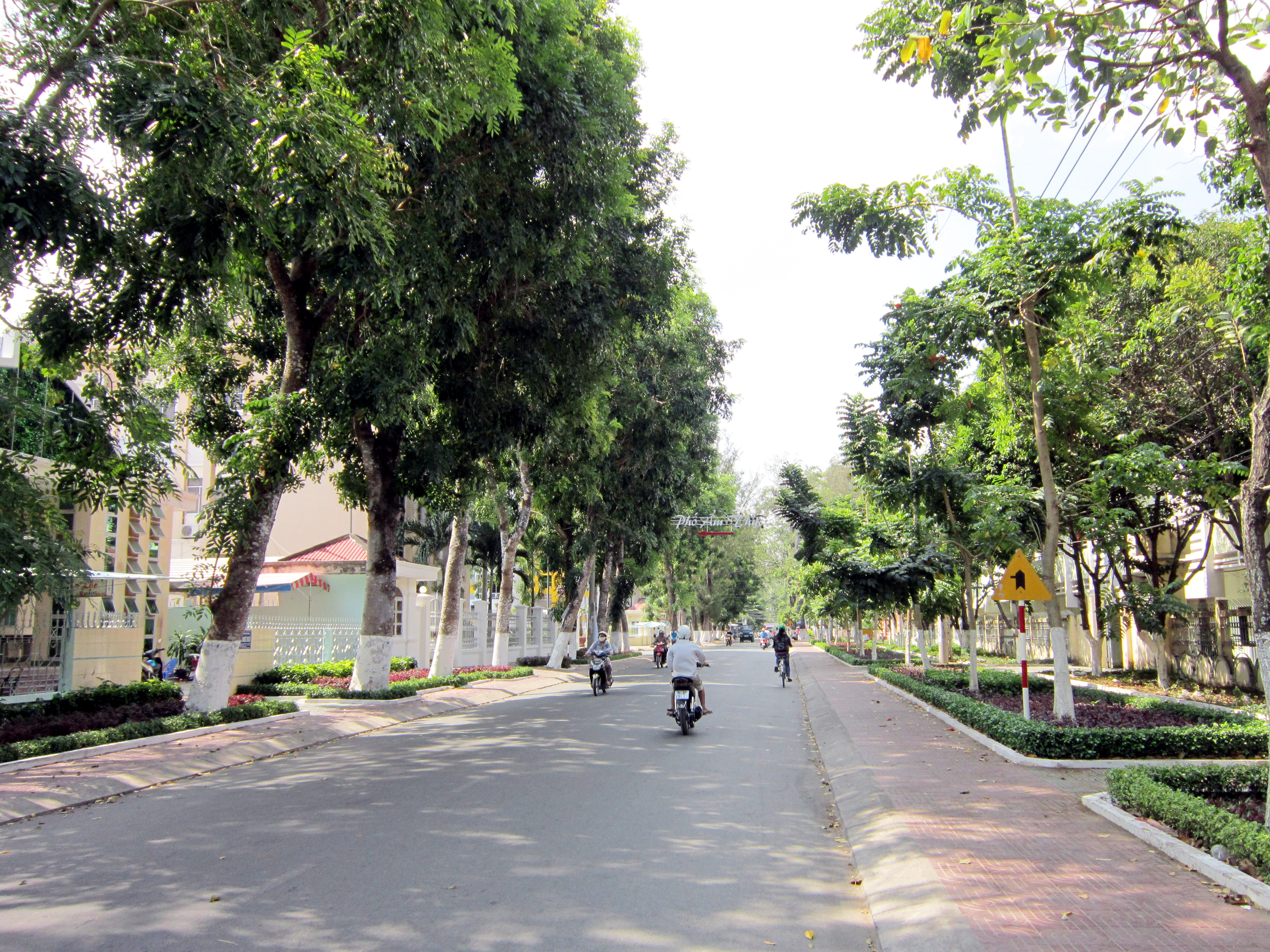
Phạm Ngũ Lão Street in the center of Trà Vinh city.

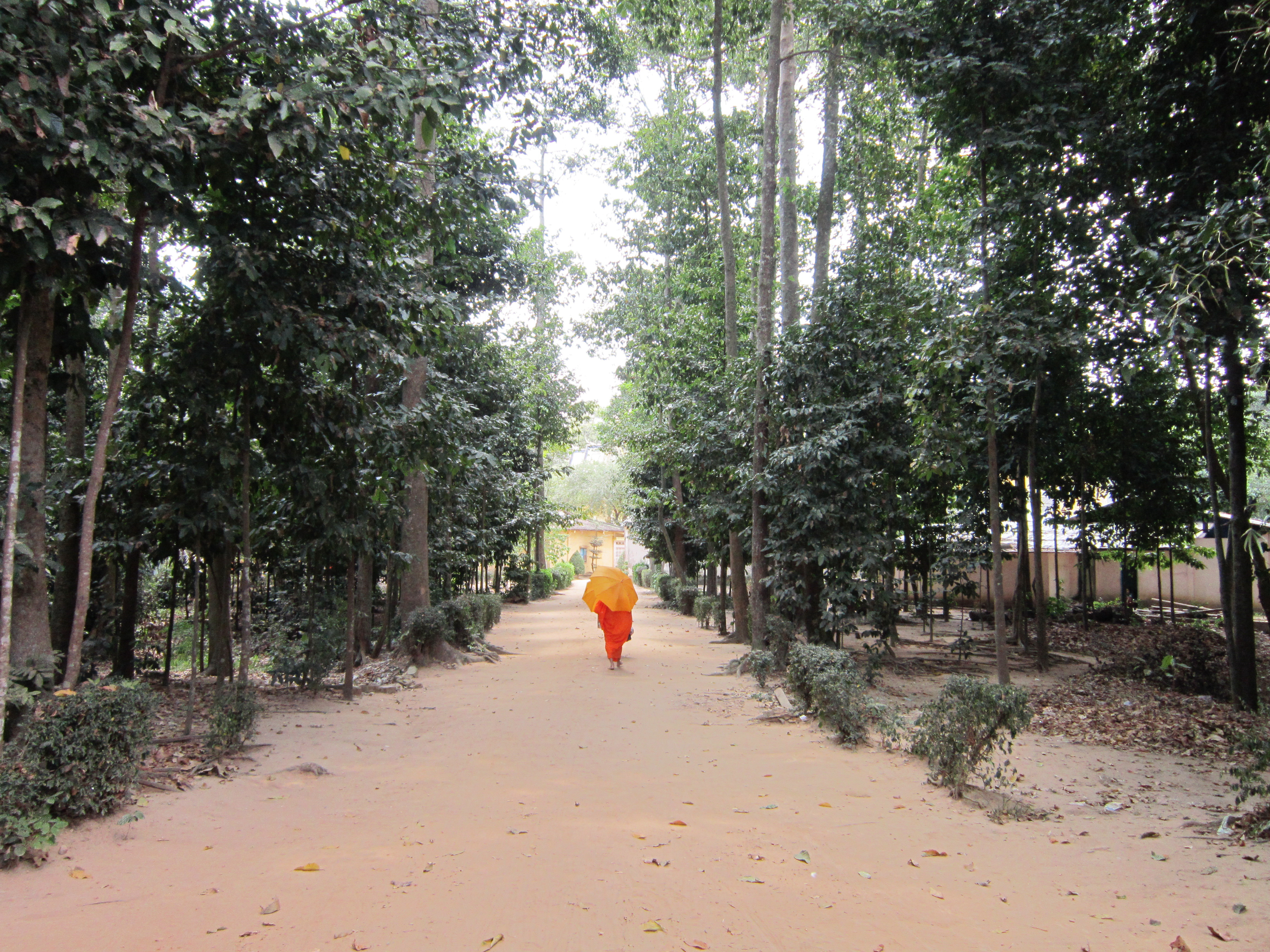
The monk returned to Hang Pagoda after begging for alms.

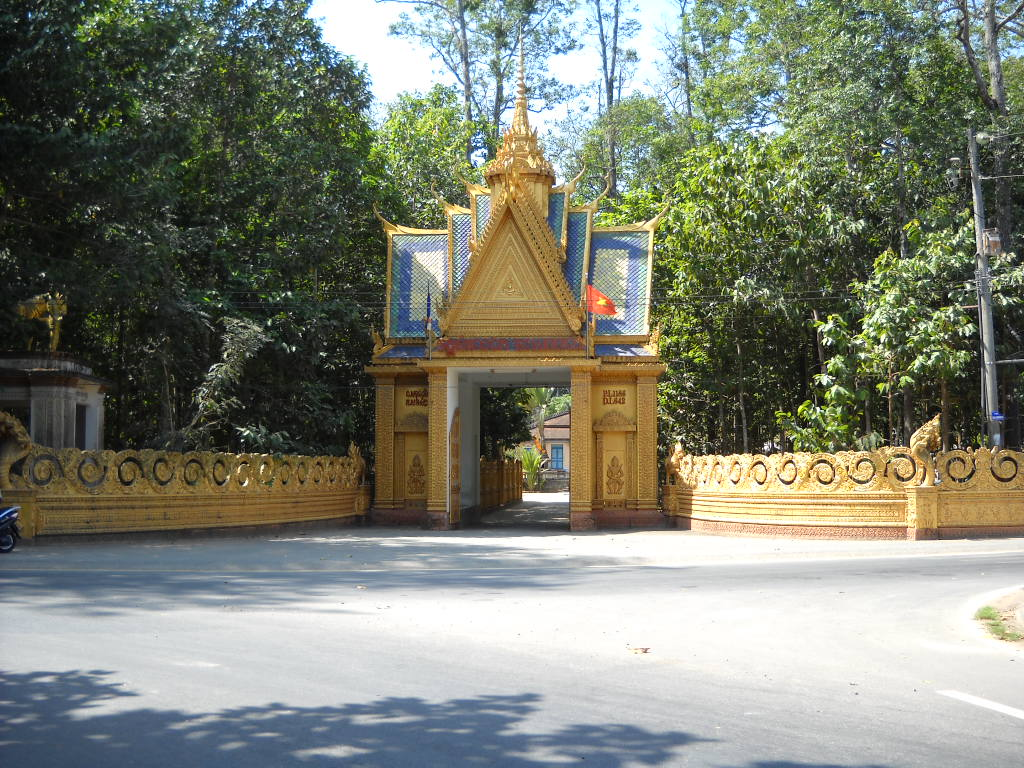
Watsamrongek Pagoda Gate, Trà Vinh.

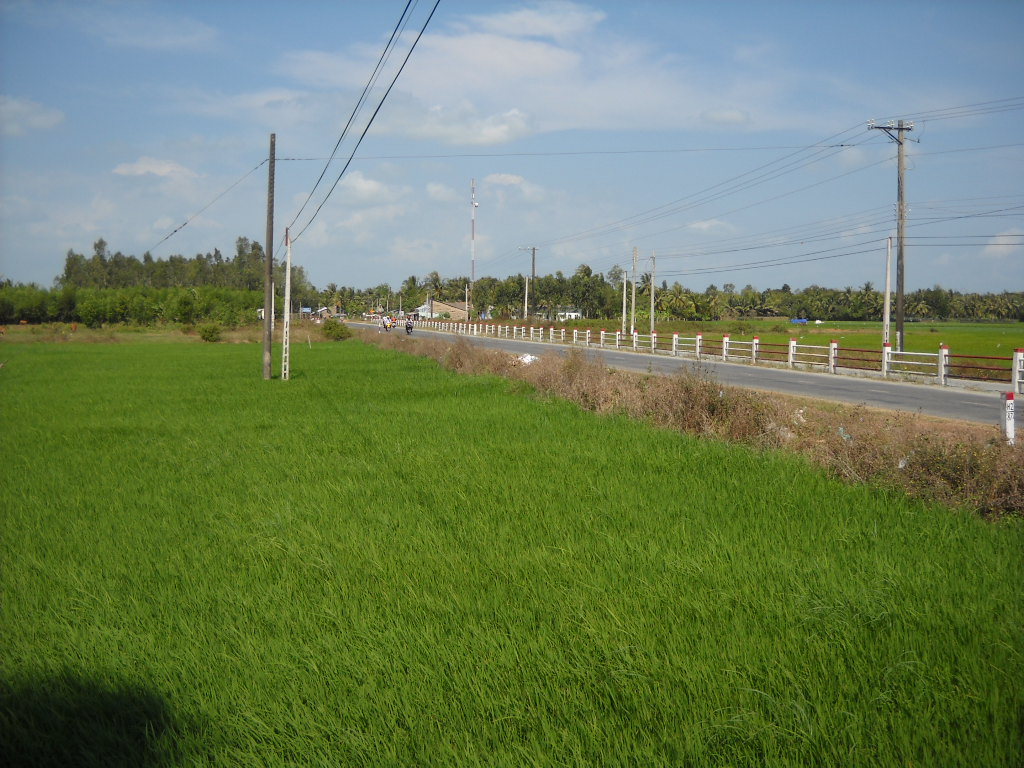
National Road 60, Trà Vinh to Sóc Trăng.

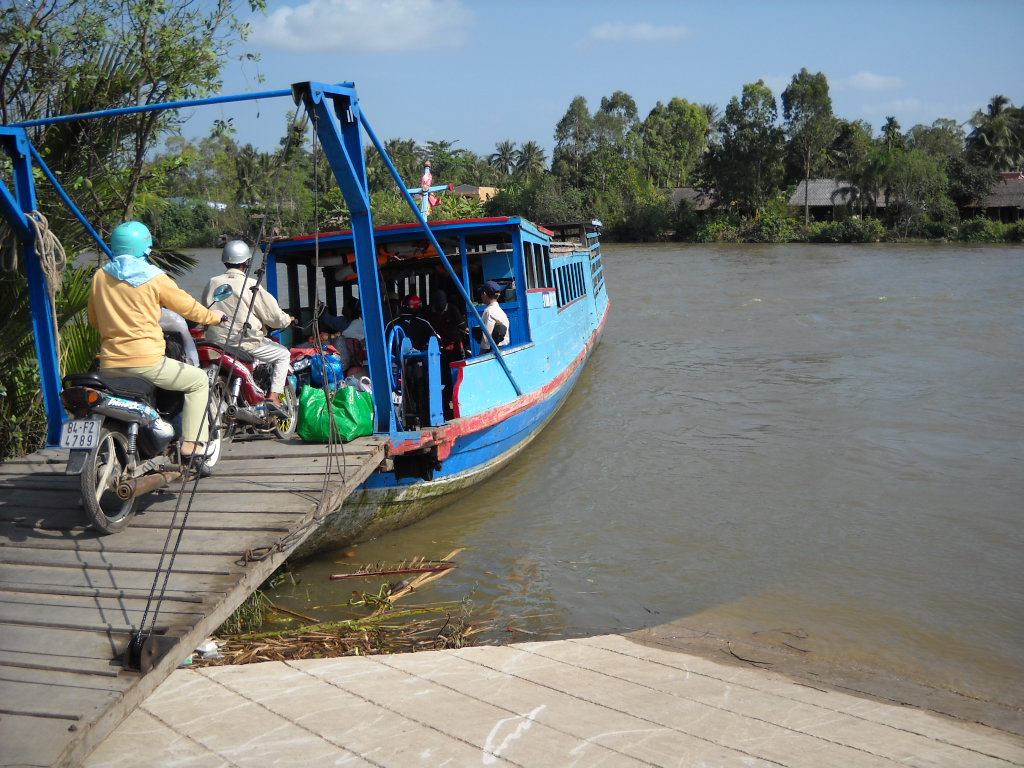
Take the ferry from Trà Vinh to Cù Lao Dung

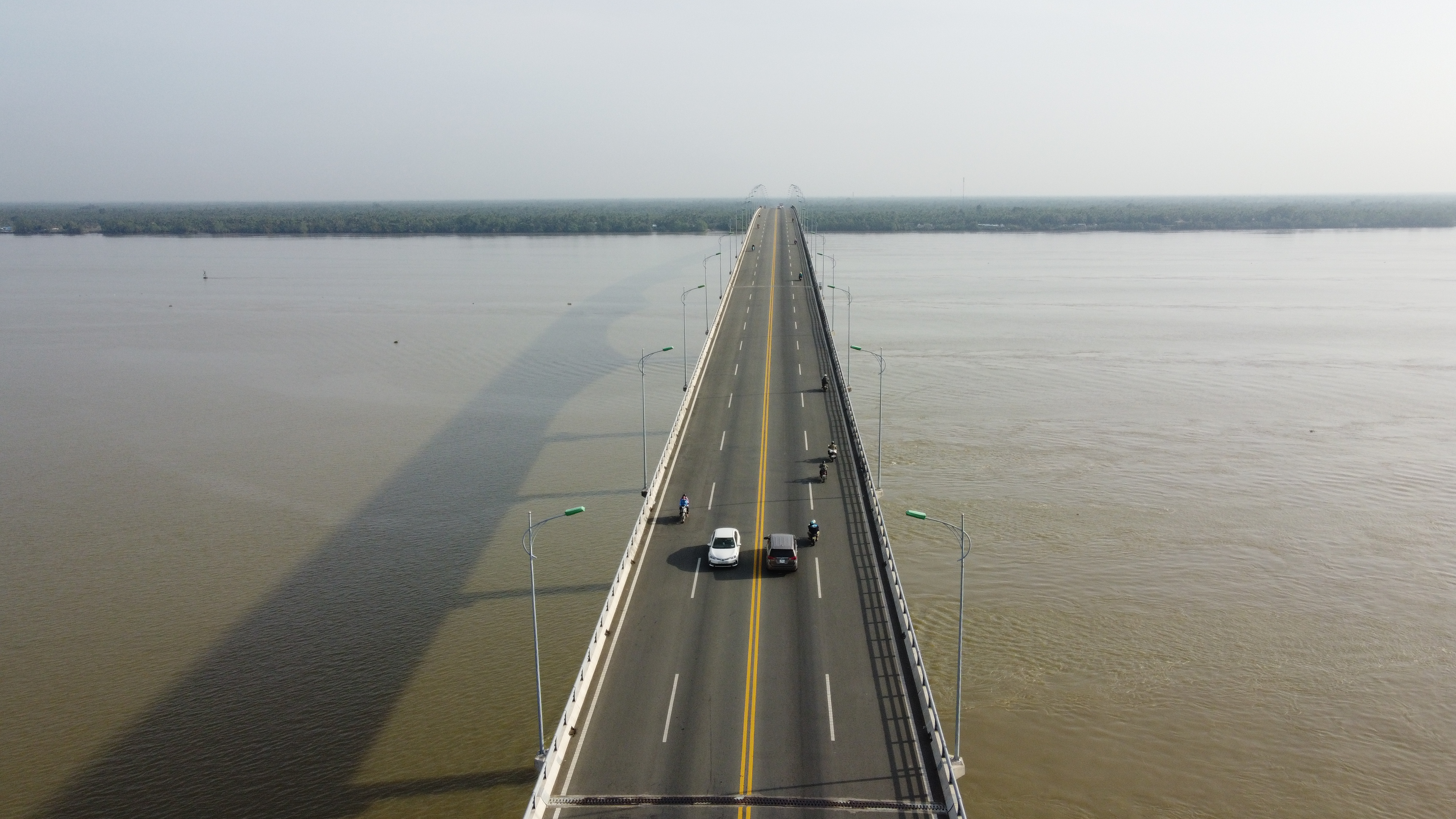
Cổ Chiên Bridge
