= Phú Long =

- Commune
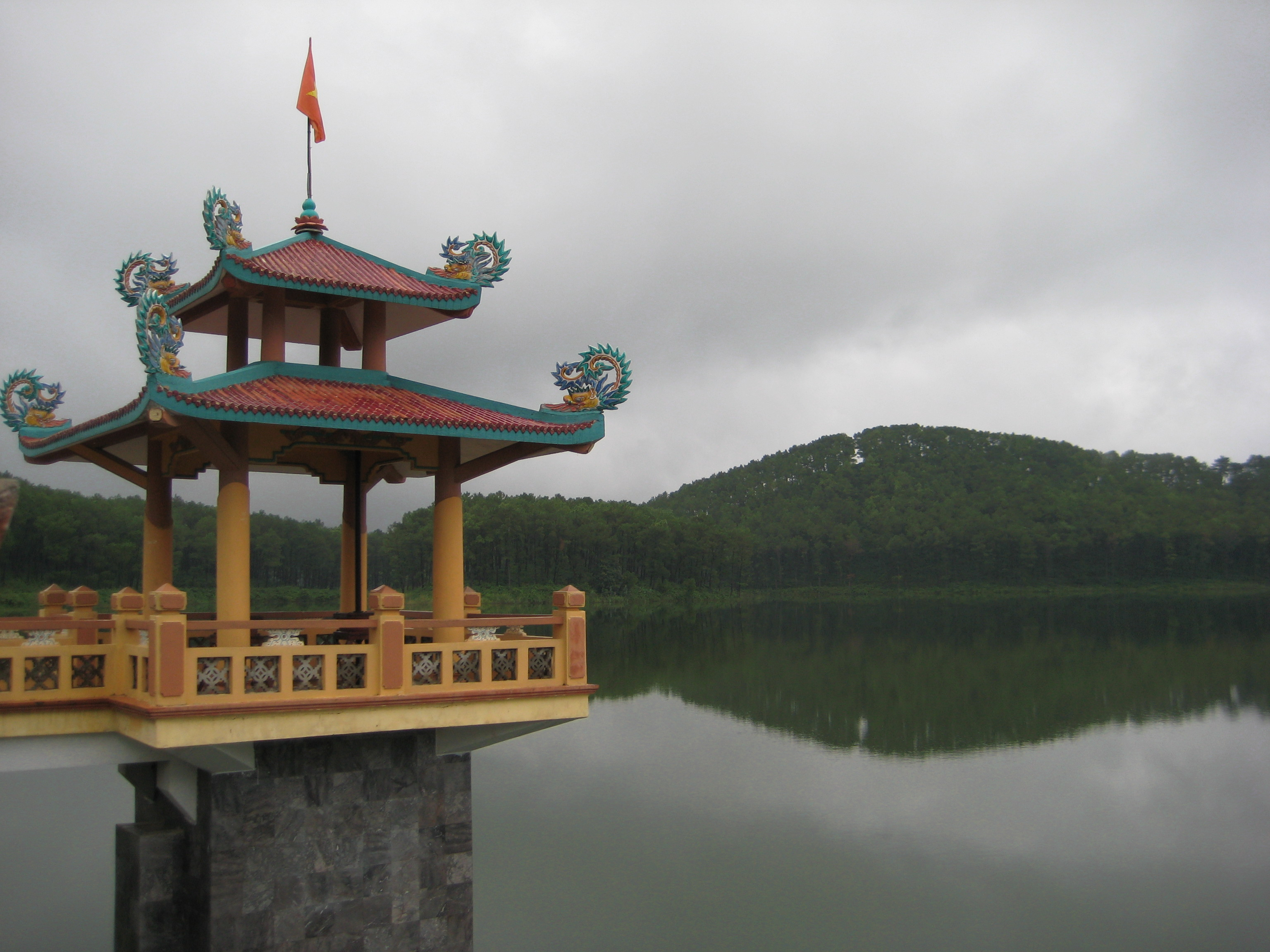
- Đồng Chương Lake
- Interactive map of Phú Long
- Coordinates: 20.21135020351585°N 105.7975904904095°E
- Country: Vietnam
- Region: Red River Delta
- Province: Ninh Bình
- Administrative headquarters: Hồng Văn Hamlet

Area
  - Total: 74.79 km^{2} (28.88 sq mi)

Population (2025)
  - Total: 13,685
  - Density: 245/km^{2} (630/sq mi)
- Postal code: 08431
- Website: phulong.ninhbinh.gov.vn

Phú Long is a commune in Ninh Bình province, Vietnam.

On 12 June 2025, the National Assembly of Vietnam adopted Resolution No. 202/2025/QH15 on the reorganization of provincial-level administrative units (effective from 12 June 2025). Under the resolution, Hà Nam province and Nam Định province were merged into Ninh Bình province.

On 16 June 2025:

- The National Assembly of Vietnam adopted Resolution No. 203/2025/QH15 amending and supplementing several articles of the Constitution of Vietnam. Under the resolution, district-level administrative units nationwide ceased to operate from 1 July 2025.
- The Standing Committee of the National Assembly of Vietnam issued Resolution No. 1674/NQ-UBTVQH15 on the arrangement of commune-level administrative units in Ninh Bình province in 2025. Under the resolution, the entire area and population of Kỳ Phú and Phú Long communes, formerly part of Nho Quan district, were merged to form a new commune named Phú Long.
