= Cầu Ngang district =

Coordinates: 9.833°N 106.417°E

Cầu Ngang district Huyện Cầu Ngang
- District
- Interactive map of Cầu Ngang district
- Country: Vietnam
- Region: Mekong Delta
- Province: Trà Vinh province

Area
  - Total: 124 sq mi (322 km^{2})

Population (2003)
  - Total: 133,501
- Time zone: UTC+7 (UTC + 7)

Cau Ngang (Vietnamese: Cầu Ngang) is a district (huyện) of Trà Vinh province in the Mekong Delta region of Vietnam.

As of 2003 the district had a population of 133,501. The district covers an area of 322 km^{2} (124 sq mi). The district capital lies at Cầu Ngang.
