= Mỹ Tú district =

Coordinates: 10°02′21″N 105°46′54″E

Mỹ Tú district Huyện Mỹ Tú
- District
- Interactive map of Mỹ Tú district
- Country: Vietnam
- Region: Mekong Delta
- Province: Sóc Trăng
- Capital: Huỳnh Hữu Nghĩa

Area
  - Total: 227 sq mi (588 km^{2})

Population (2003)
  - Total: 207,634
- Time zone: UTC+7 (UTC + 7)

Mỹ Tú is a former rural district (huyện) of Sóc Trăng province in the Mekong River Delta region of Vietnam. As of 2003 the district had a population of 207,634. The district covers an area of 588 km^{2} (227 sq mi). The district capital lies at Huỳnh Hữu Nghĩa.
