= Trần Đề =

Trần Đề Xã Trần Đề
- Commune
- Trần Đề commune
- Location within Vietnam
- Coordinates: 9°31′17″N 106°11′31″E
- Country: Vietnam
- Region: Mekong Delta
- Province: Cần Thơ
- Time zone: UTC+7 (UTC + 7)

Trần Đề is a commune (xã) of Cần Thơ, Vietnam.
