= Long Phú district =

Coordinates: 9.583°N 106.133°E

Long Phú district Huyện Long Phú
- District
- Interactive map of Long Phú district
- Country: Vietnam
- Region: Mekong Delta
- Province: Sóc Trăng
- Capital: Long Phú (township)

Area
  - Total: 171 sq mi (442 km^{2})

Population (2003)
  - Total: 181,438
- Time zone: UTC+7 (UTC + 7)

Long Phú is a rural district of Sóc Trăng province in the Mekong River Delta region of Vietnam. As of 2003 the district had a population of 181,438. The district covers an area of 442 km^{2}. The district capital lies at Long Phú.
