= Cù Lao Dung =

Cù Lao Dung Xã Cù Lao Dung
- Commune
- Cù Lao Dung commune
- Location within Vietnam
- Coordinates: 9°40′02″N 106°09′10″E
- Country: Vietnam
- Region: Mekong Delta
- Province: Cần Thơ
- Time zone: UTC+7 (UTC + 7)

Cù Lao Dung is a commune (xã) of Cần Thơ, Vietnam.
