= Sóc Trăng province =

Former province of Vietnam

Sóc Trăng ខេត្តឃ្លាំង (Khmer)
- Province
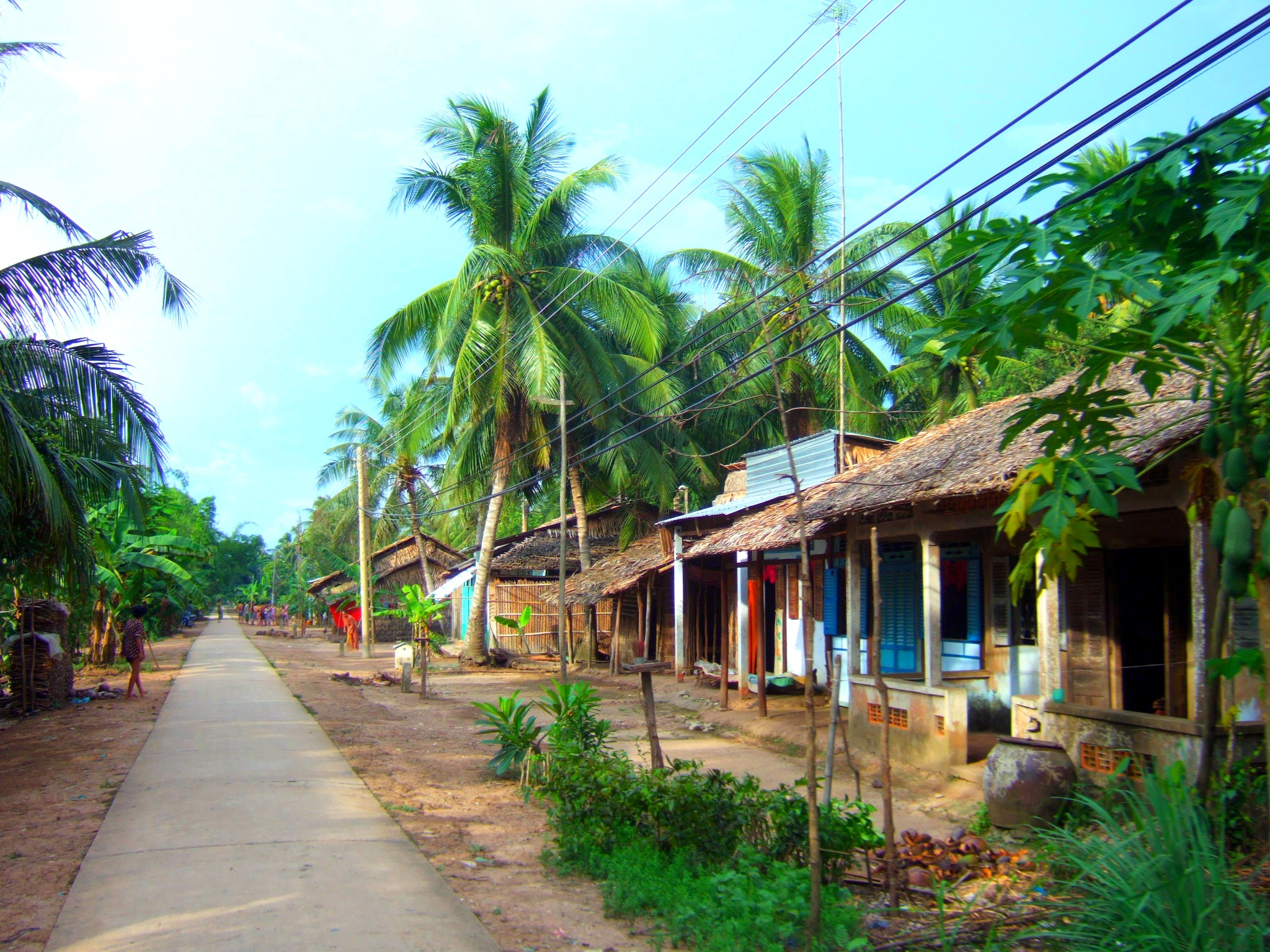
- Rural Sóc Trăng

- Seal

- Location of Sóc Trăng within Vietnam
- Coordinates: 9°40′N 105°50′E
- Country: Vietnam
- Region: Mekong Delta
- Capital: Sóc Trăng

Government
  - People's Council Chair: Hồ Thị Cẩm Đào
  - People's Committee Chair: Trần Văn Lâu

Area
  - Total: 3,298.20 km^{2} (1,273.44 sq mi)

Population (2025)
  - Total: 1,703,286
  - Density: 516.429/km^{2} (1,337.54/sq mi)

Demographics
  - Ethnicities: Vietnamese (64.83%), Khmer, Hoa

GDP
  - Total: VND 49.346 trillion US$ 2.143 billion
- Time zone: UTC+7 (ICT)
- Area codes: 299
- ISO 3166 code: VN-64
- HDI (2020): ▲0.668 (54th)
- Website: www.soctrang.gov.vn

Sóc Trăng (Khmer: ខេត្តឃ្លាំង, lit. 'Land of Depositories') was a former province in the Mekong Delta of Southern Vietnam, with its capital in Sóc Trăng. The province occupies an area of 3,298.20 km^{2} (1,273.44 mi^{2}) and has a population of approximately 1,213,400.

From June 12, 2025, Sóc Trăng province (with Hậu Giang province) was merged into Cần Thơ.

== Etymology ==
Sóc Trăng was known as Ba Xuyên during Minh Mạng's admininistration.

During the Nguyễn Dynasty of emperor Minh Mạng, it was given the Sino-Vietnamese name Nguyệt Giang (月江), a calque of "Sông Trăng" (Moon River).

The name Sóc Trăng comes from the Khmer name of the area ស្រុកឃ្លាំង Srok Khleang, which means Land of depositories or Place to store silver. The Vietnamese transliteration gave Sốc Kha Lang and later Sóc Trăng.

== Geography ==
Sóc Trăng province lies roughly between 9°14'N and 9°56'N latitude and between 105°34'E and 106°18'E longitude. It is bordered by Trà Vinh to the northeast, Vĩnh Long to the north, Hậu Giang to the northwest and Bạc Liêu to the south. To the south east of Sóc Trăng is 72 kilometres (45 mi) of coastline of the South China Sea. The province has two large rivers: the Hậu River and the Mỹ Thanh River. The capital of Sóc Trăng province is Sóc Trăng city. It is 231 kilometres (144 mi) from Ho Chi Minh City.

=== Administrative divisions ===
Soc Trang province has 11 district-level administrative units, including 8 districts, 2 district-level towns and 1 provincial city.

- 9 districts:
  - Châu Thành
  - Cù Lao Dung
  - Kế Sách
  - Long Phú
  - Mỹ Tú
  - Mỹ Xuyên
  - Thạnh Trị
  - Trần Đề
- 2 district-level town:
  - Vĩnh Châu
  - Ngã Năm
- 1 provincial city:
  - Sóc Trăng (capital)

They are further subdivided into 12 commune-level towns (or townlets), 80 communes, and 16 wards.

== Gallery ==
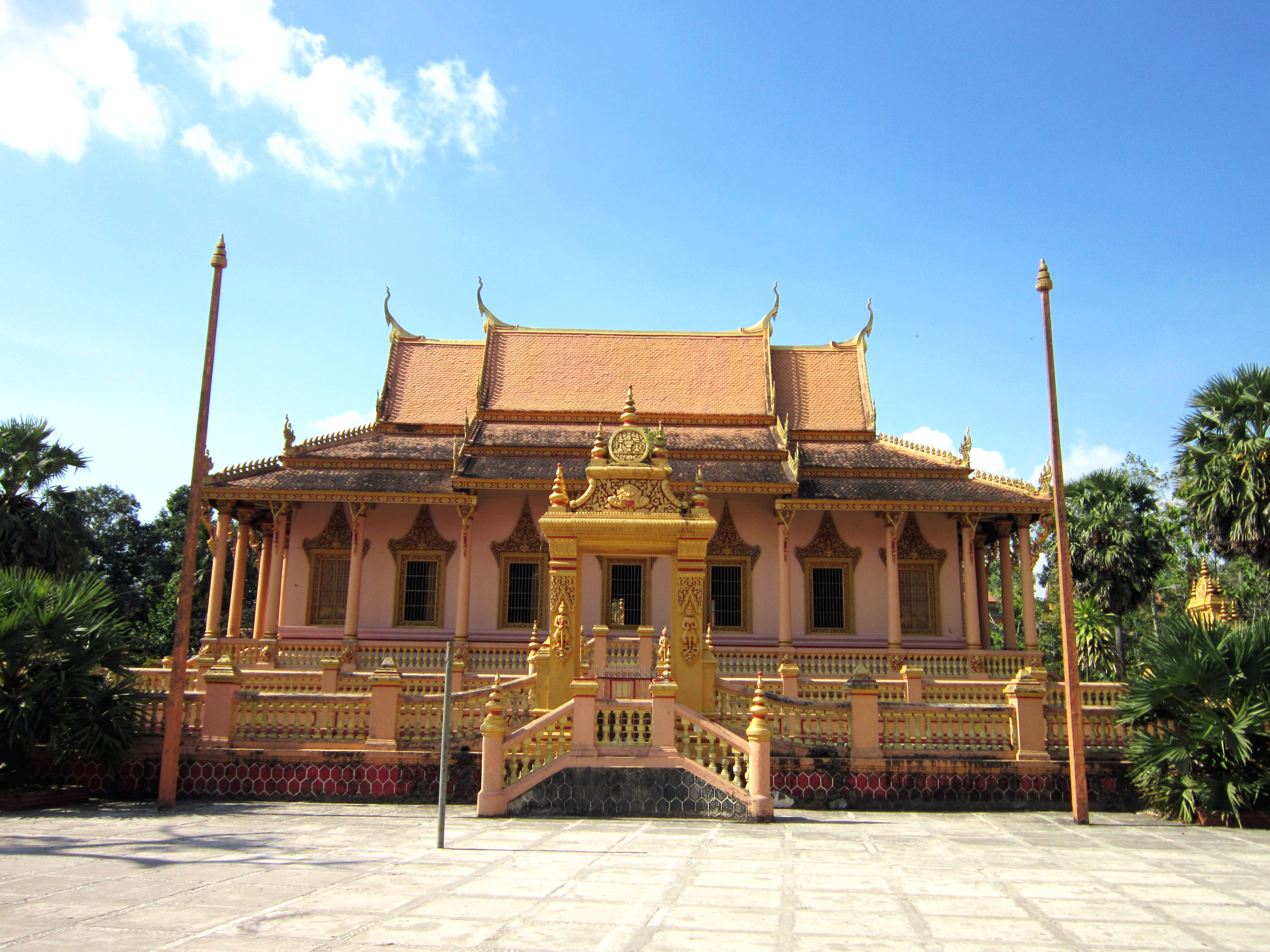
Khleang Pagoda in Ward 6, Sóc Trăng City

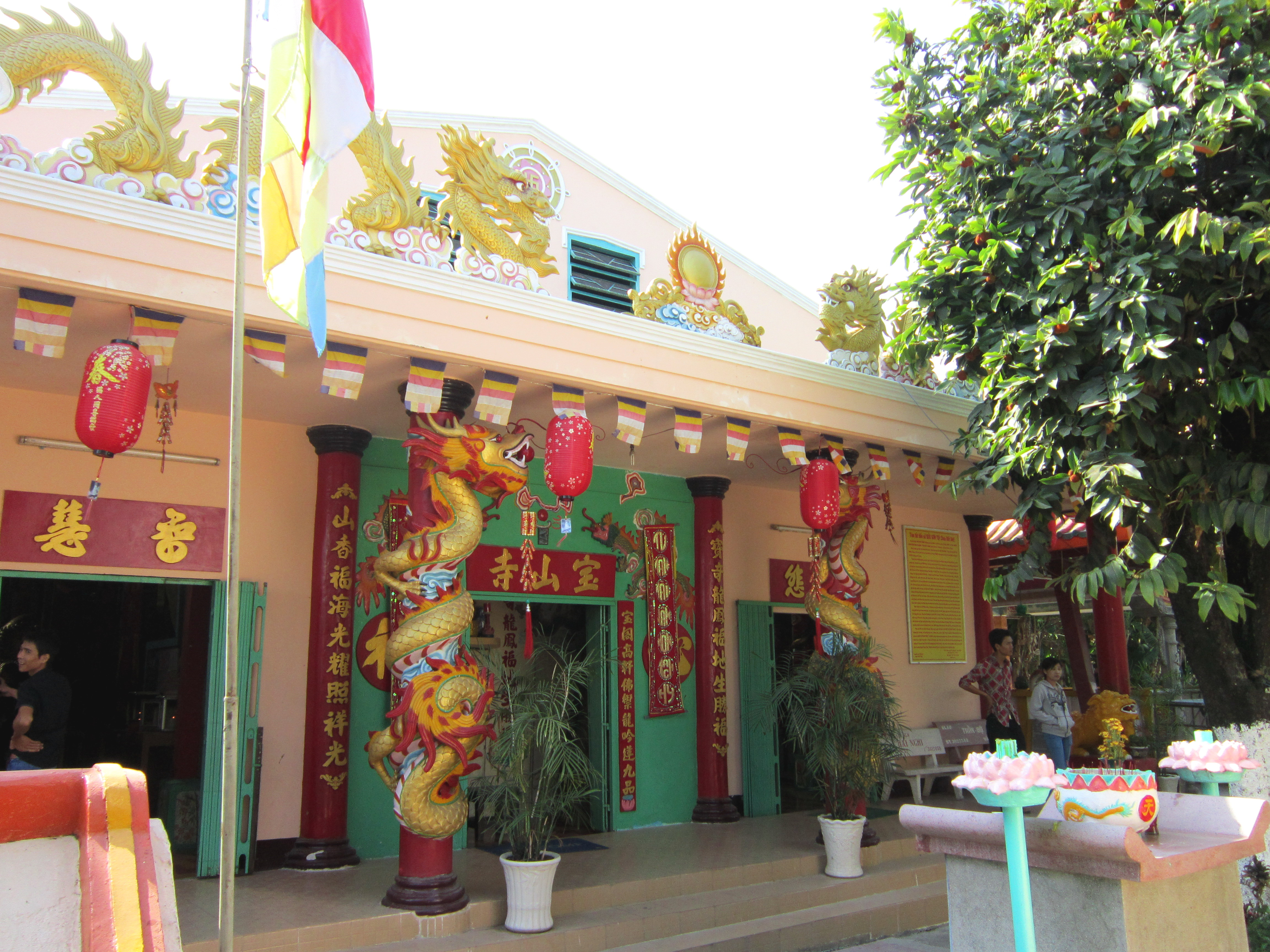
Bửu Sơn Pagoda (Also known as Clay Pagoda) in Sóc Trăng City

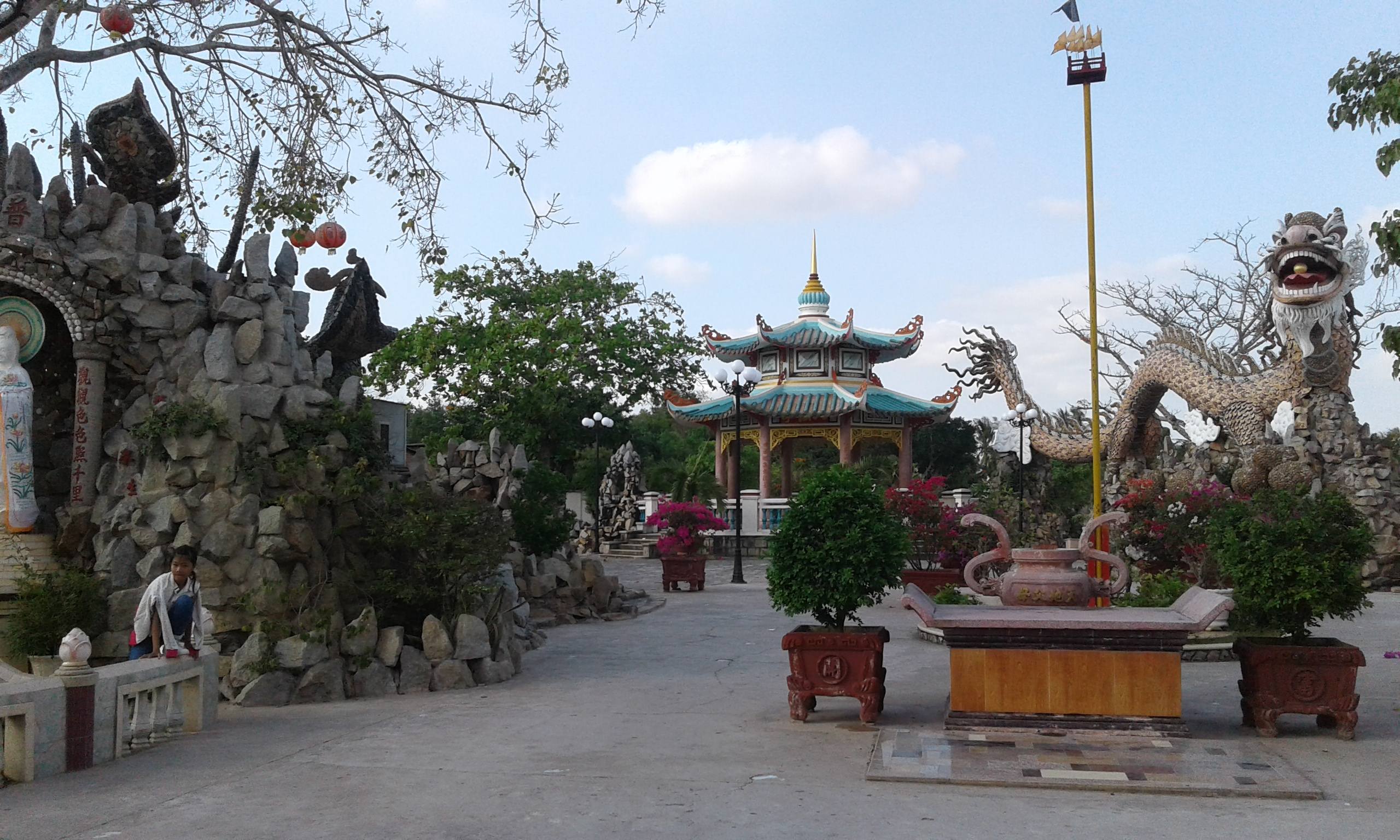
La Hán Pagoda, Ward 8, Sóc Trăng City

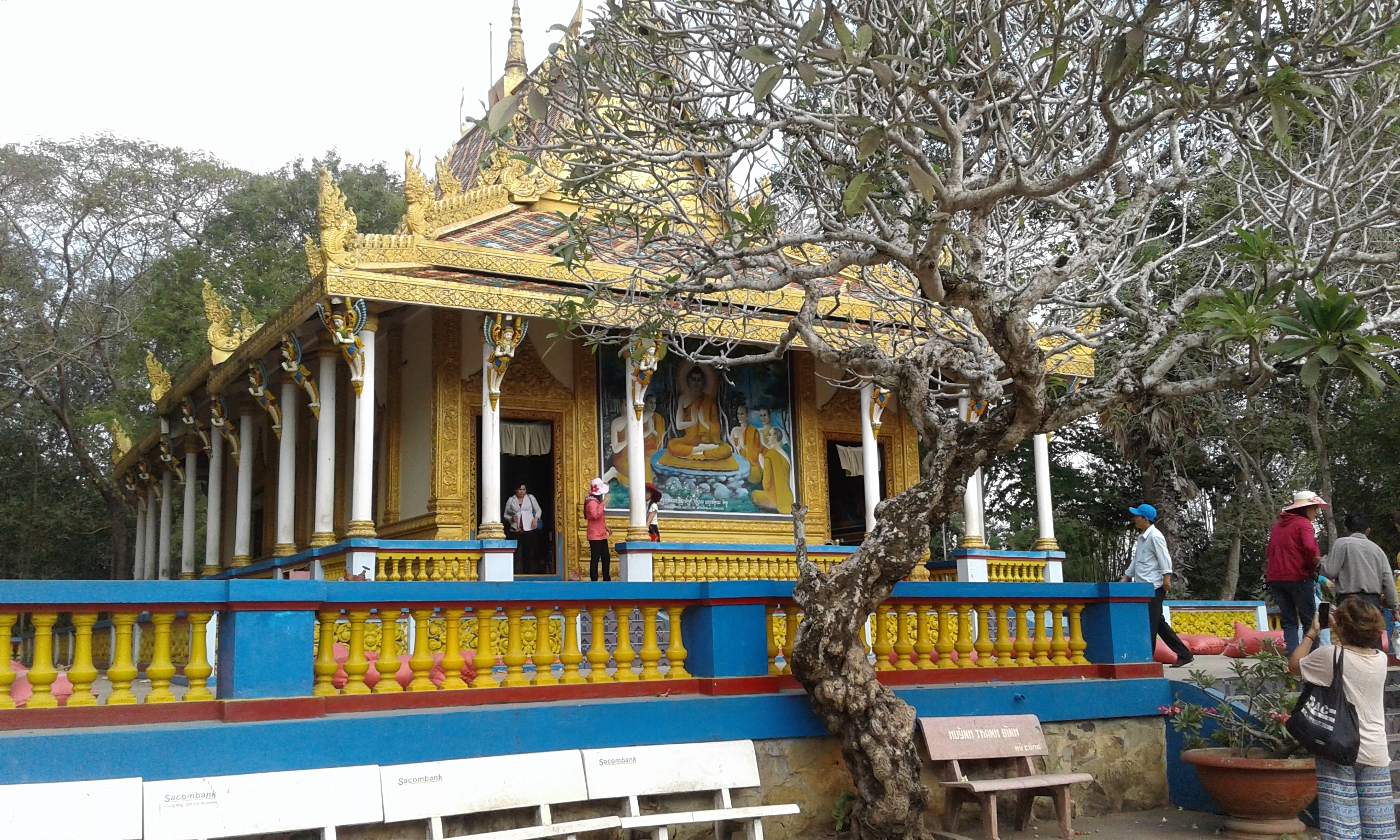
Main hall of Bat Pagoda (Mahatup), Ward 3, Sóc Trăng City

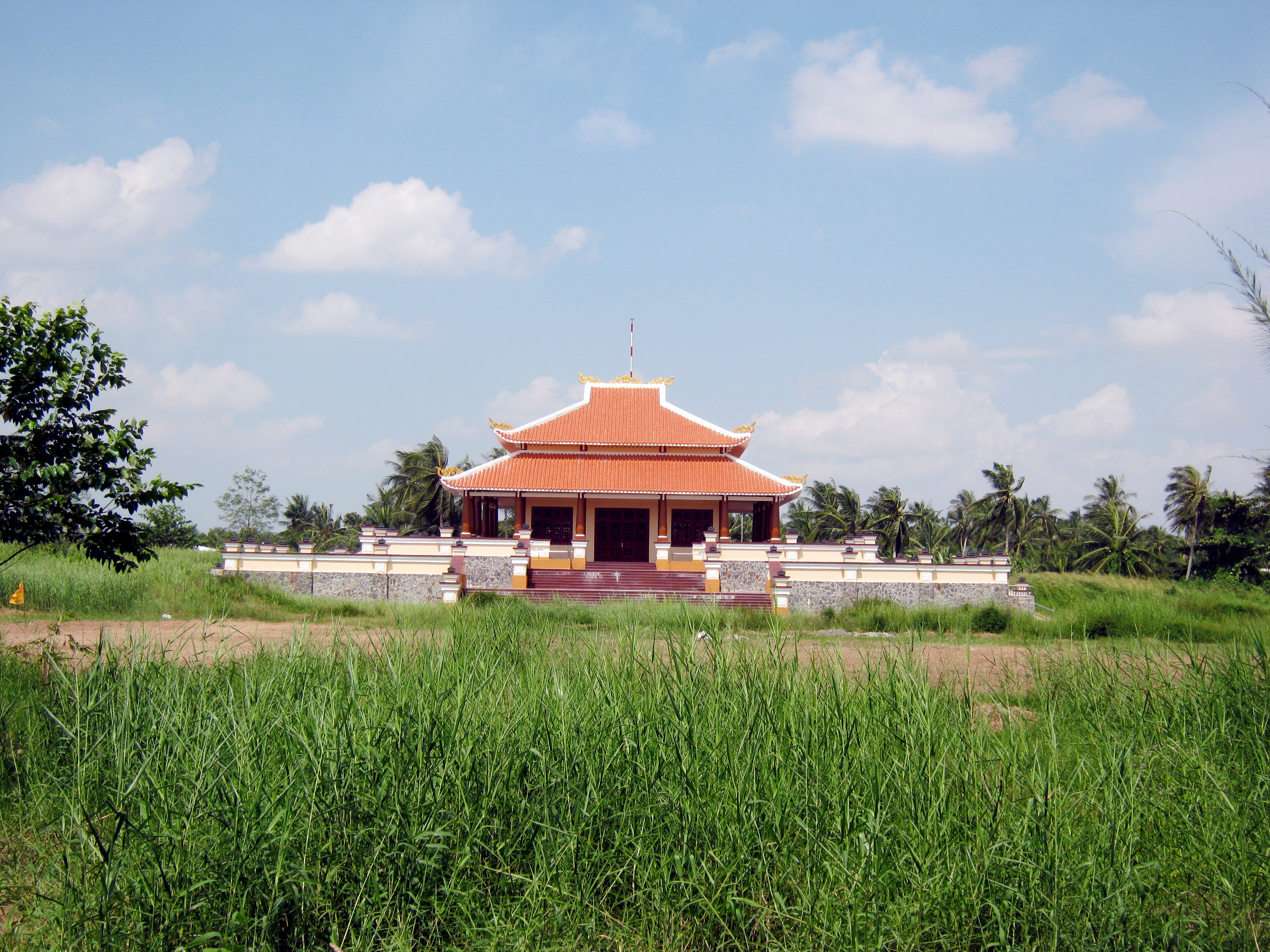
Đền thờ Bác Hồ - An Thạnh Đông, huyện Cù Lao Dung

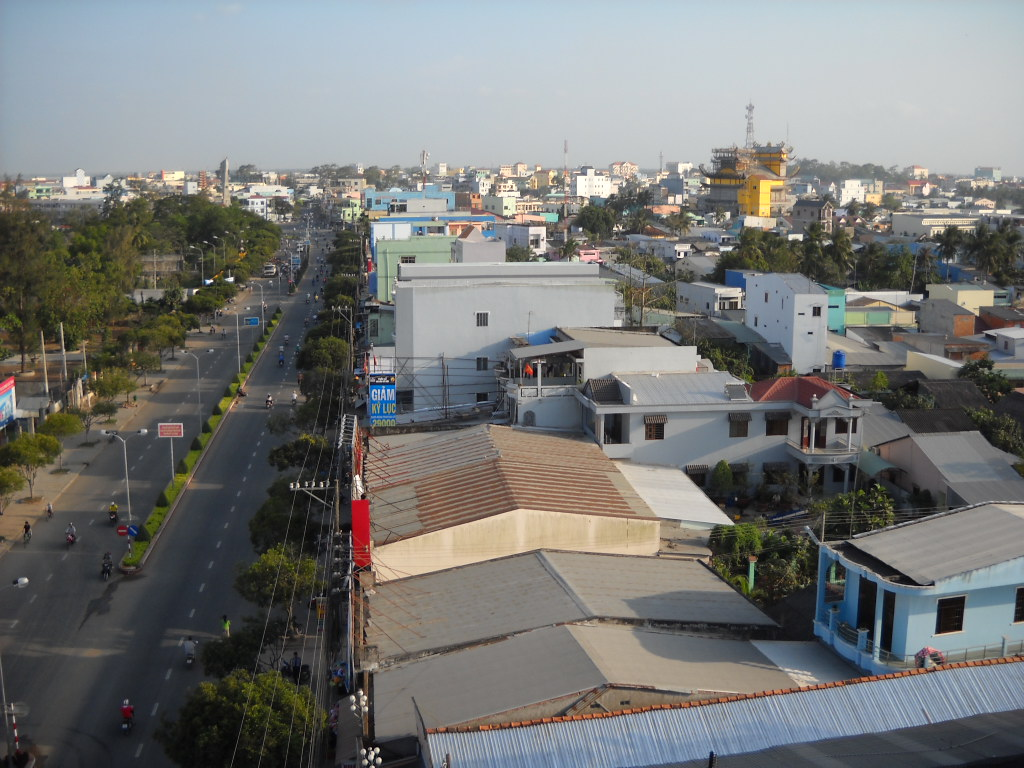
A corner of Sóc Trăng City

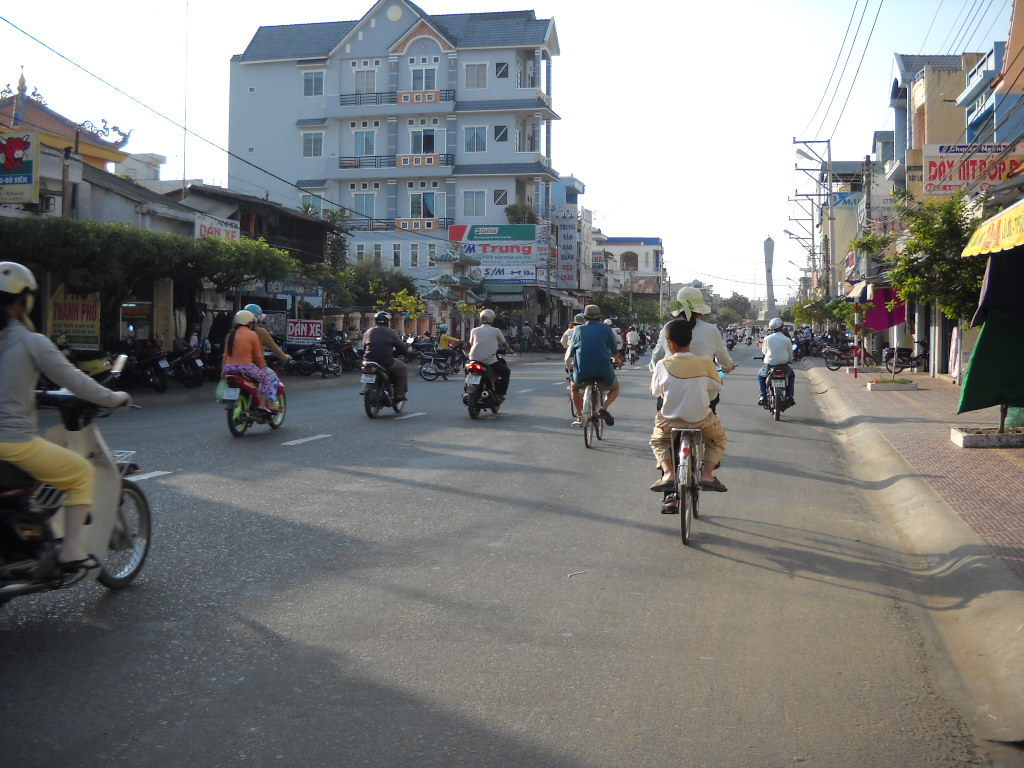
Streets in Sóc Trăng City

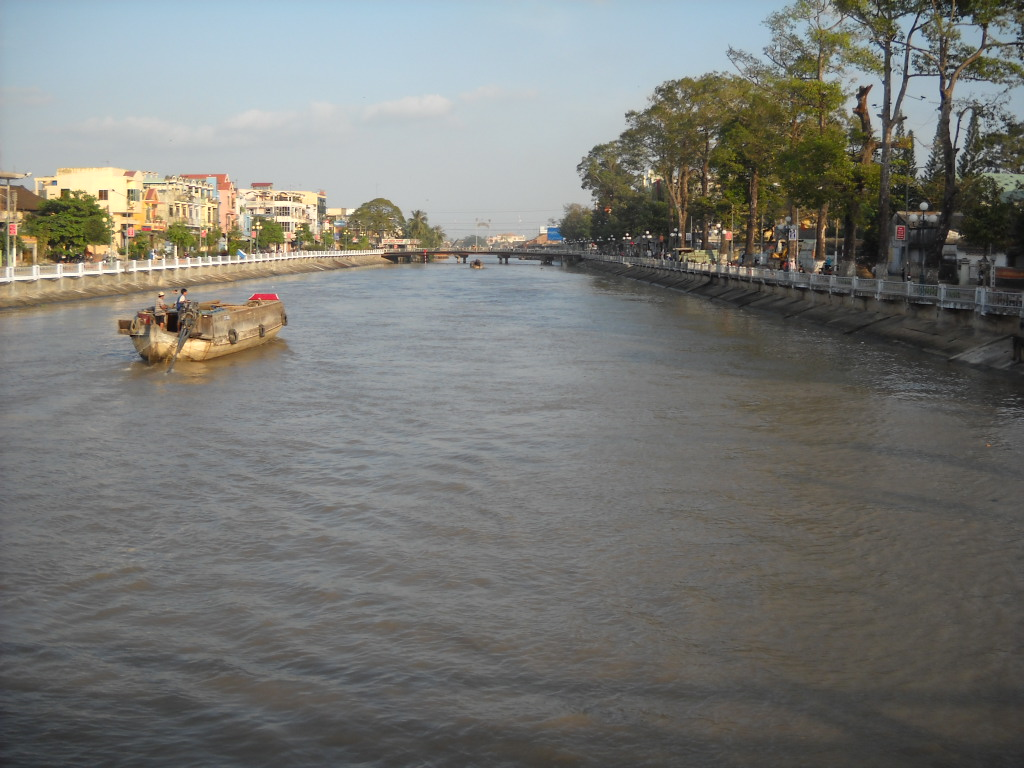
Maspero River, Sóc Trăng City

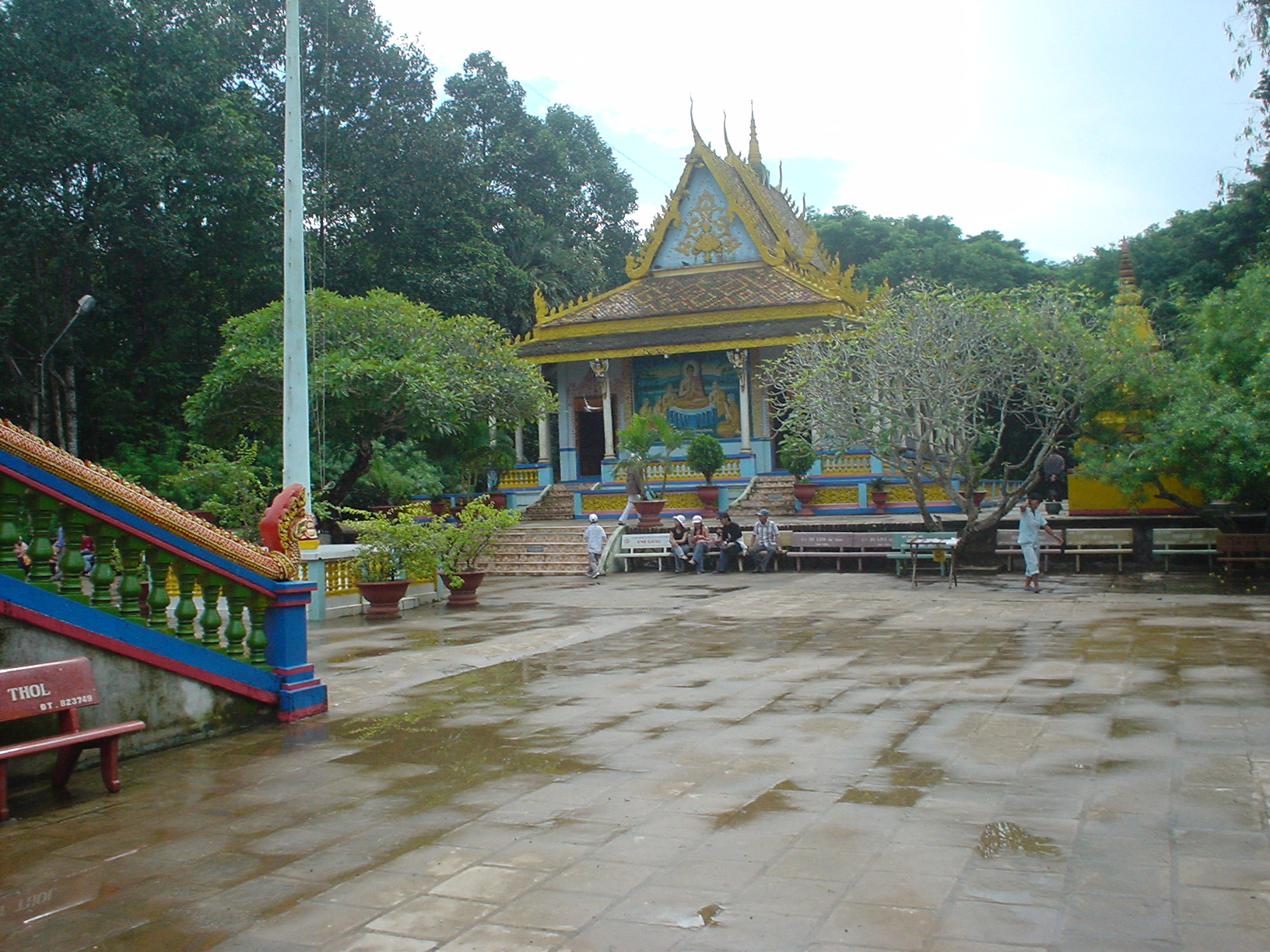
Mã Tộc Pagoda

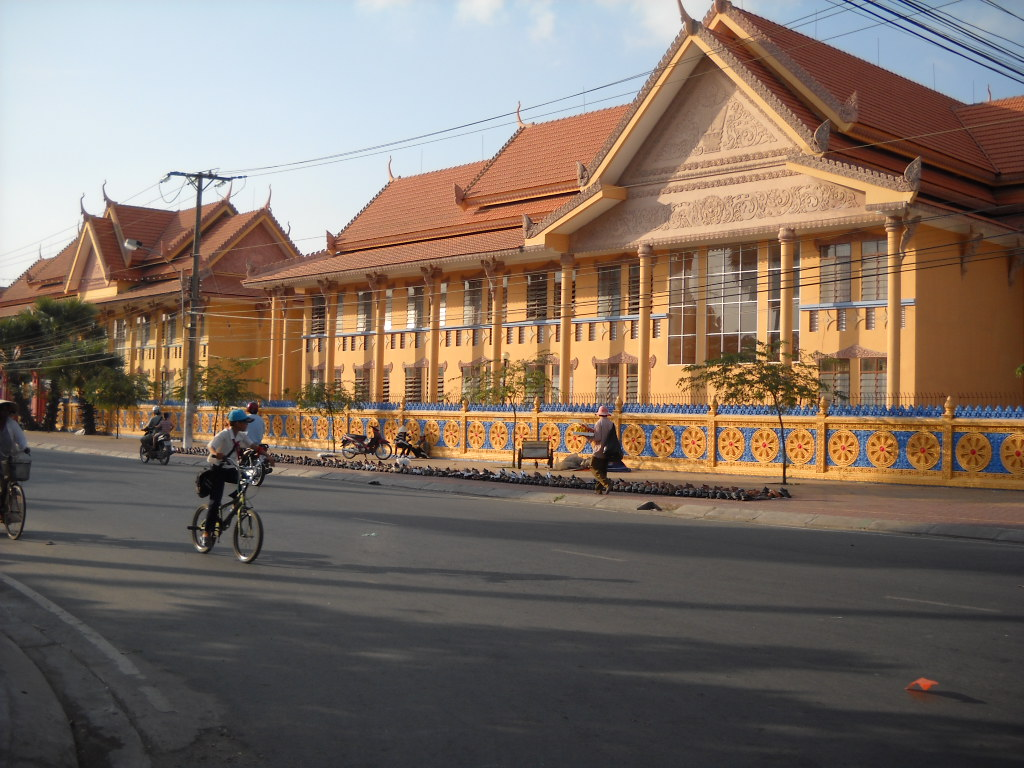
Theravada Buddhist Monastery, Sóc Trăng City

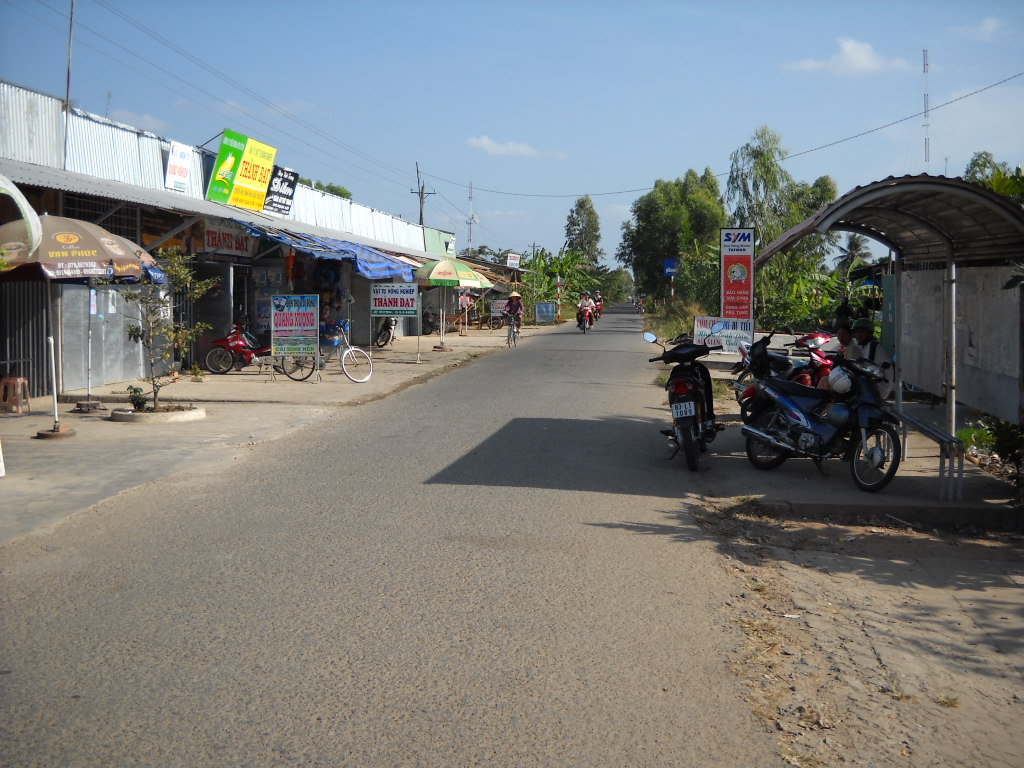
Cù Lao Dung, Sóc Trăng City

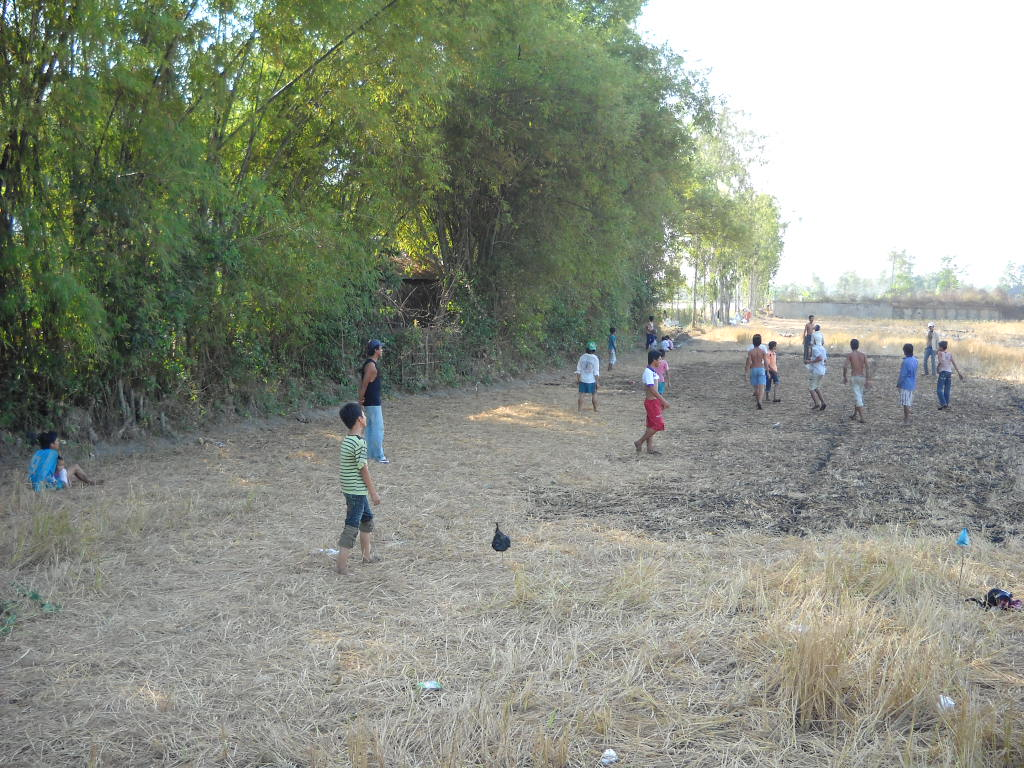
Children play football in Long Phú, Sóc Trăng City

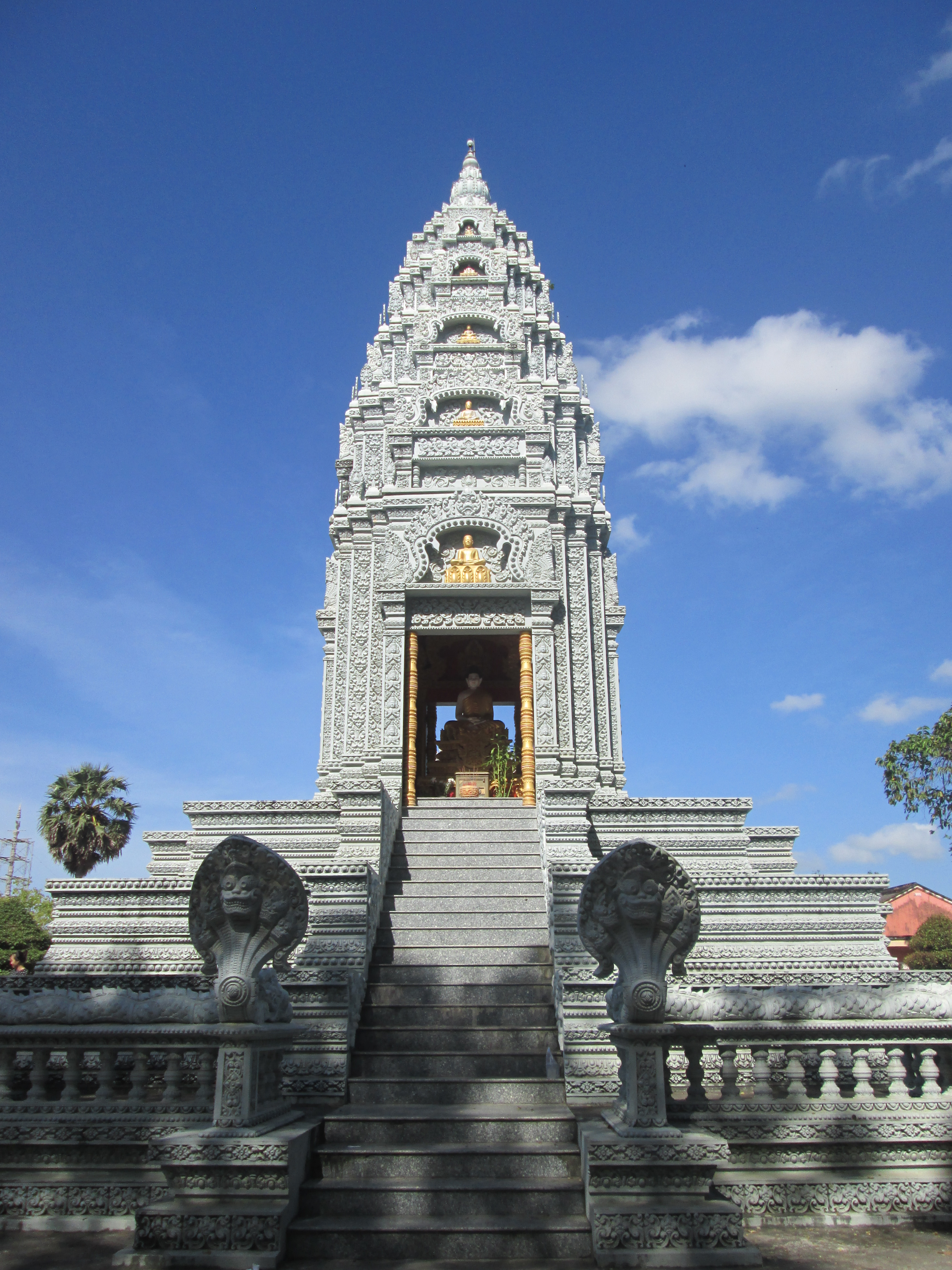
Stupa at the temple Som Rong, Sóc Trăng City
