= Buddhism in Vietnam =

Vietnamese Buddhists

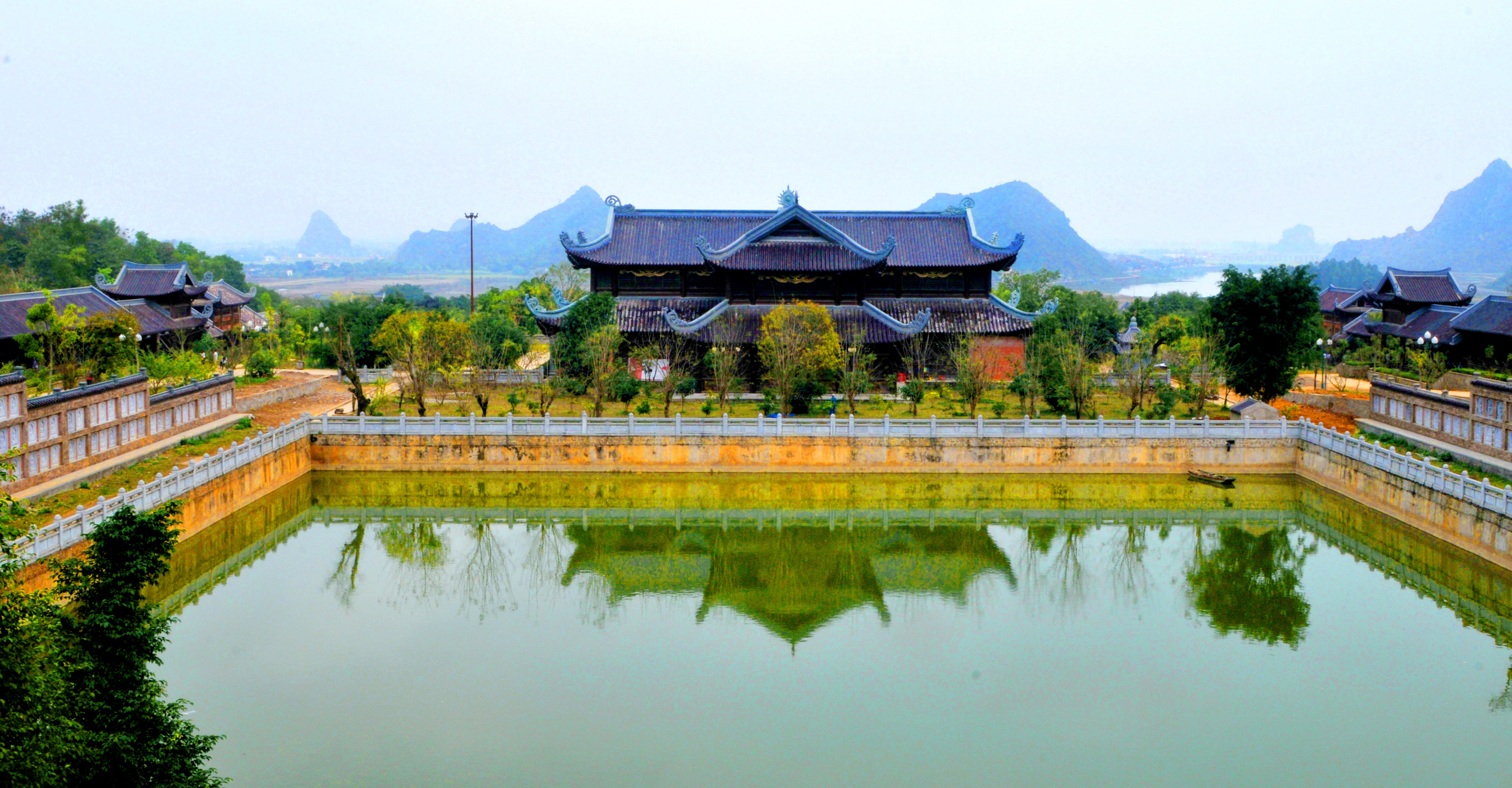
- Bái Đính Temple in Ninh Bình Province, Vietnam

Total population
- 4,608,410 (2019 Census)

Regions with significant populations
- Throughout Vietnam

Religions
- Mahayana Buddhism, Theravada Buddhism

Languages
- Vietnamese

Buddhism in Vietnam (Vietnamese: Đạo Phật, 道佛 or Phật Giáo, 佛教), as practiced by the Vietnamese people, is a form of East Asian Mahayana Buddhism. It is the second largest religion in Vietnam. According to the Vietnamese government's 2019 National Population and Housing Census, approximately 4.6 million individuals identified as Buddhists, representing about 4.8% of the total population at that time. However, the U.S. Department of State's 2023 Report on International Religious Freedom cites Vietnam's "White Book", stating that the Buddhist population increased from nearly 10 million in 2008 to approximately 14 million in 2021, which accounts for 13.3% of the overall population of Vietnam.

Buddhism may have first come to Vietnam as early as the 3rd or 2nd century BCE from the Indian subcontinent or from China in the 1st or 2nd century CE. Vietnamese Buddhism has had a syncretic relationship with certain elements of Taoism, Chinese spirituality, and Vietnamese folk religion. Theravada Buddhism also exists, as well as indigenous forms of Vietnamese Buddhism such as Bửu Sơn Kỳ Hương and Hòa Hảo.

Vietnamese Buddhism is generally inclusive and syncretic, drawing on the main Chinese Buddhist traditions, such as Tiantai (Vietnamese: Thiên Thai) and Huayan (Hoa Nghiêm), Zen (Thiền), and Pure Land (Tịnh Độ).

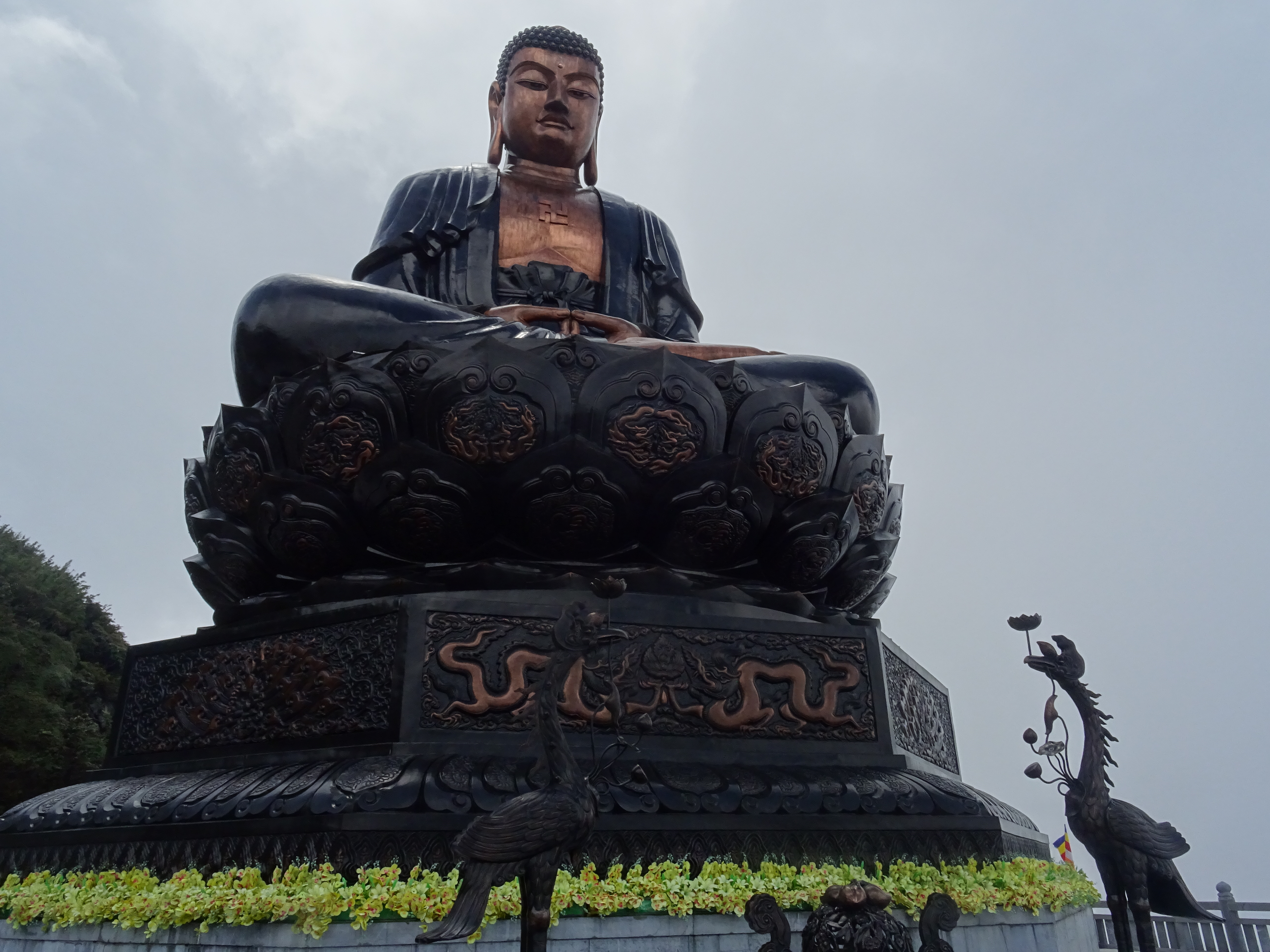
Statue of Amitābha Buddha (Phật A Di Đà) on Fansipan (Phan Xi Păng) Mountain, Lào Cai Province.

== History ==
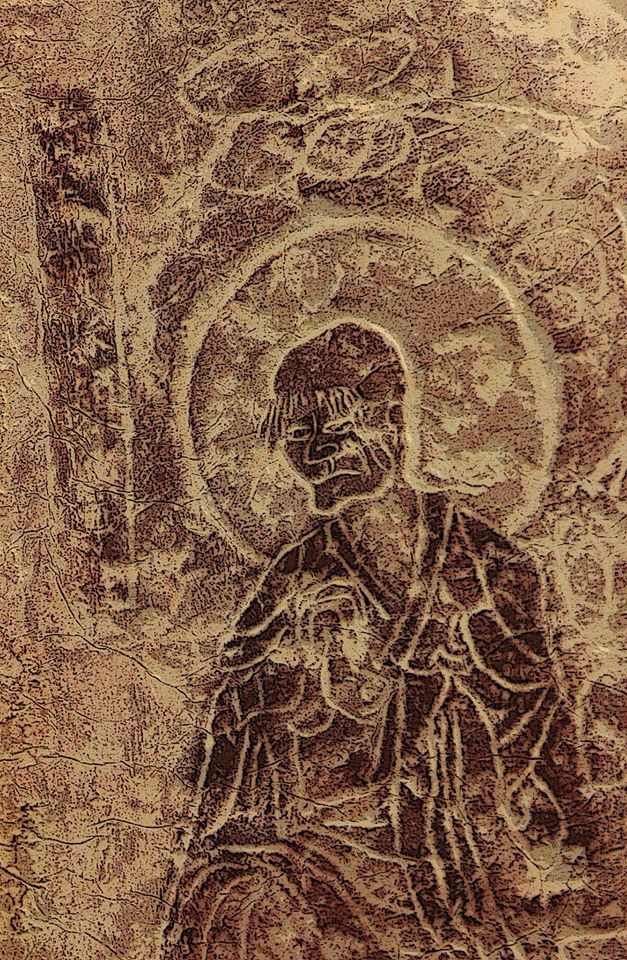
Buddhist Arhat mural in Liên Hoa cave, Ninh Bình province, dated 10-11th century

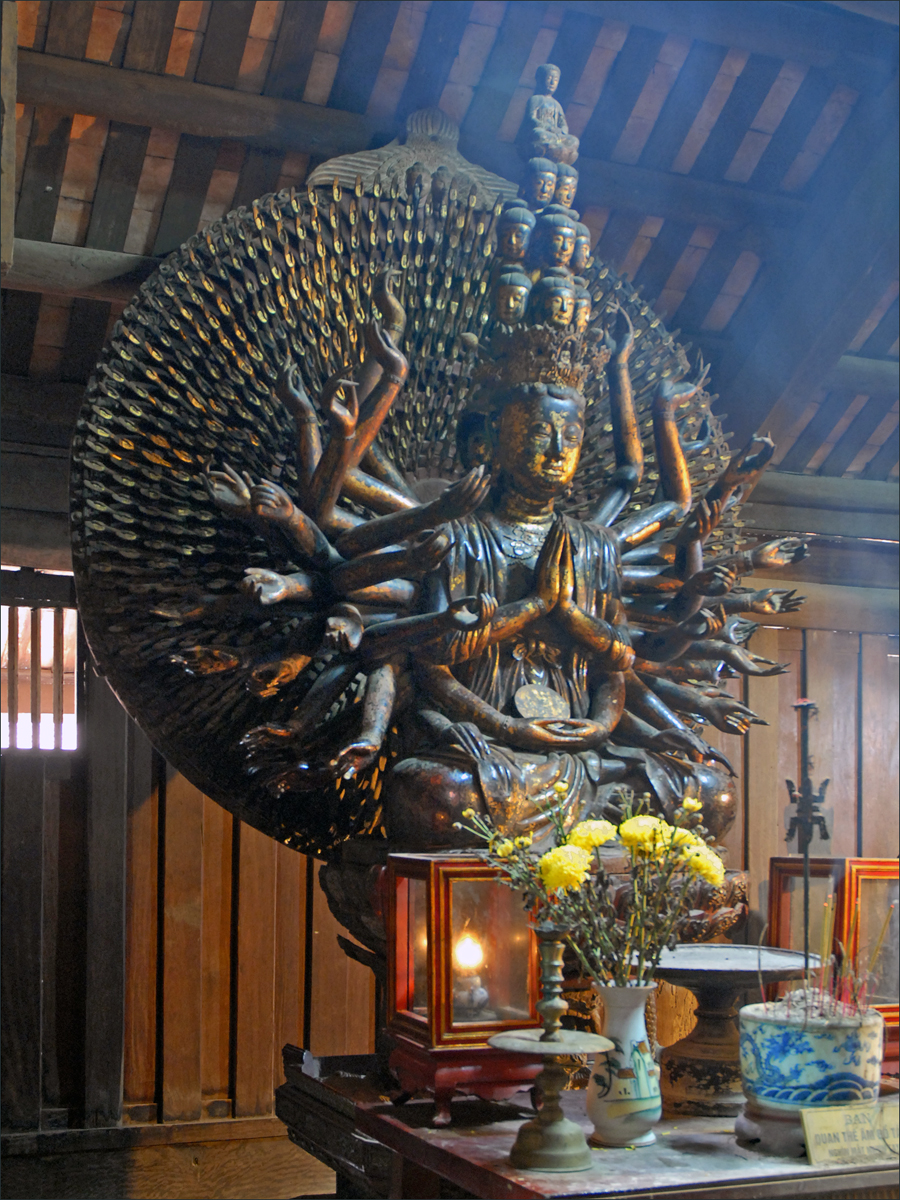
Statue of Avalokiteśvara (Quan Âm), lacquered and gilded wood at the Bút Tháp Temple, dating from the Revival Lê era with inscription "autumn of the year Bính Thân" (1656).

Buddhism has a long history in Vietnam. The religion's history in the country spans various periods, from its initial entry during the early centuries of the first millennium CE to the modern era. Vietnamese research teams have gathered previously unknown data from archaeological finds and ancient archival records to provide historical analysis and cultural interpretation.

=== Early history ===
There are conflicting theories regarding whether Buddhism first reached Vietnam during the 3rd or 2nd century BCE via delegations from India, or during the 1st or 2nd century from China. In either case, by the end of the 2nd century CE, Vietnam had developed into a major regional Mahayana Buddhist hub, centering on Luy Lâu in modern Bắc Ninh Province, northeast of the present-day capital city of Hanoi. Luy Lâu was the capital of the Han region of Jiaozhi and was a popular destination visited by many Indian Buddhist missionary monks en route to China. The monks followed the maritime trade route from the Indian subcontinent to China used by Indian traders. A number of Mahayana sutras and the āgamas were translated into Classical Chinese there, including the Sutra of Forty-two Chapters and the Anapanasmrti-sutra. Jiaozhi was the birthplace of Buddhist missionary Kang Senghui, who was of Sogdian origin.

Early Buddhist missionaries included the Indian monks Mahajivaka and Kalacarya. Mahajivaka and Kalacarya arrived together in Luy Lâu, the headquarters of Governor Shishee (Si Nhiep), towards the end of the Han dynasty Emperor Lingdi's reign (168-189 AD). While Kalacarya stayed in Giao Châu (modern Jiaozhou), Mahajivaka continued to China. Kalacarya's name, possibly transliterated from Sanskrit meaning "black sage," suggests he might have been a Dravidian from Southern India. The presence of numerous Indian monks in Giao Chau accompanying Si Nhiep is noted in a letter from Vien Huy to Tuan Huc in 207 A.D.

The Li Huo Lun, a Buddhist primer, was written by Mouzi, a Chinese scholar who became a Buddhist in Giao Chau and later returned to China. Mouzi sought asylum in Giao Chau due to the turmoil in China after Emperor Lingdi's death. Despite being invited to a high-ranking post by Governor Shishee, Mouzi refused, preferring to study. After his mother's death, he dedicated himself to Buddhism and Taoism, using writings to defend Buddhism against those who saw it as a betrayal of the Classics.

The 3rd to 5th Centuries saw further figures like Kararuci and Dao Thanh who spread "lotus-meditation". This era also saw the writing of the Bach Hac Luan ("Discussion between Black and White") by the monk Hue Lam. Hue Lam rejected the Pure Land school, possibly seeking to reconcile Confucianism and Buddhism. The self-immolation of the monk Dam Hoang, and his visible ascent to the Pure Land, is interpreted as a monastic defense of Pure Land teaching and a refutation of Hue Lam. An exchange of letters between Chinese official Li Miao and two Vietnamese monks, Dao Cao and Phap Minh, reveals the impact of doctrinal controversy. Dao Cao was identified as a Vietnamese monk from Giao Chau. Hue Lam's criticisms in Bach Hac Luan, published in 435 under Song Emperor Wendi, coincided with official efforts to restrict pagoda construction and statue casting due to waste, adding context to the debates.

The first Ch'an (Zen) sect in Vietnam was founded by Vinitaruci and Phap Hien. Vinitaruci, an Indian monk tonsured in China, transmitted Chinese Ch'an to Vietnam around 580 A.D. He arrived at Pháp Vân Pagoda in March 580 and trained people there until his death in 591. His teachings emphasized the Prajña ('wisdom of emptiness') tradition and 'direct transmission' of bodhi ('enlightenment') from Master to disciple. He also translated prayers. Phap Hien succeeded Vinitaruci as the second Patriarch of this sect. The second Ch'an sect in Vietnam was named after its founder, Wu Yantong. Wu Yantong was a Chinese monk ordained by Bai Zhang. He arrived in Vietnam in 820 A.D. and transmitted his 'Buddha-heart seal' to Cam Thanh before his death in 826 A.D.. The sect emphasized Bai Zhang's doctrine of 'no-thinking'. Thien Hoi was the third Patriarch. The transmission lineage is traced through Chinese masters like Hui Neng and Ma Daoyi to Bai Zhang. Prominent monks from the Vinitaruci (Tỳ Ni Đa Lưu Chi) sect included Pháp Thuận and Ma Ha (tenth generation), Thien Ong and Sung Pham (eleventh generation), and Vạn Hạnh (twelfth generation).

Over the next eighteen centuries, Vietnam and China shared many common features of cultural, philosophical and religious heritage as a result of geographical proximity and northern parts of Vietnam being annexed twice by China. Vietnamese Buddhism is thus related to Chinese Buddhism in general, and to some extent reflects the formation of Chinese Buddhism after the Song dynasty. Meanwhile, in 875 new Cham king Indravarman II who was a devout Mahayana Buddhist, established Mahayana as Champa's state religion, and built the large monastery complex of Đồng Dương. His dynasty continued to rule Champa until the late 10th century.

=== Dynastic period ===
During the Đinh dynasty (968–980), Mahayana Buddhism was recognized by the state as an official religion (~971), reflecting the high esteem of Buddhist faith held by the Vietnamese monarchs, included some influences from the Vajrayana section. The Early Lê dynasty (980–1009) also afforded the same recognition to the Buddhist sangha. The growth of Buddhism during this time is attributed to the recruitment of erudite monks to the court as the newly independent state needed an ideological basis on which to build a country. Subsequently, this role was ceded to Confucianism.

Vietnamese Buddhism reached its zenith during the Lý dynasty (1009–1225), beginning with the founder Lý Thái Tổ, who was raised in a Buddhist temple. All of the emperors during the Lý dynasty professed and sanctioned Buddhism as the state religion. This endured with the Trần dynasty (1225–1400), but Buddhism had to share the stage with the emerging growth of Confucianism. During the Lý Buddhism saw significant development as Vietnamese society became more stable and the centralized state consolidated. The Buddhist belief in benevolence influenced royal policies. Buddhist activities and celebrations created unique cultural characteristics, with numerous festivals for the inauguration of pagodas and towers built by the state. Local pagodas were also built. This period saw the continued presence of the Vinitaruci and Wu Yantong sects. Some monks in the Wu Yantong sect are believed to have practiced Tantrism, including Không Lộ and Giác Hải, and possibly Bát Nhã from the Thảo Đường sect. The Pure Land sect and the cults of Avalokitesvara and Amitabha were also widespread and influenced Chan sects. Thiền Uyển Tập Anh, compiled during the later Trần period, is a valuable document for studying Buddhism under the Lý dynasty.

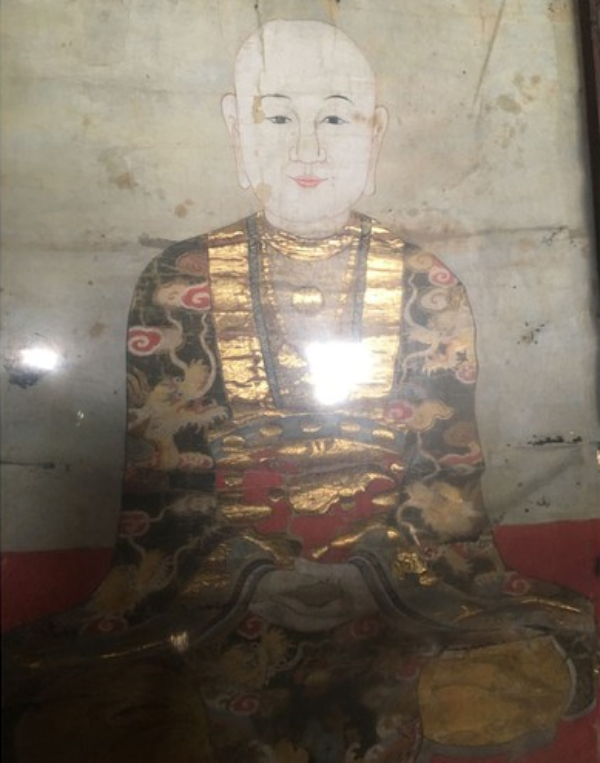
Portrait of Zen master Nguyễn Minh Không (1065 – 1141)

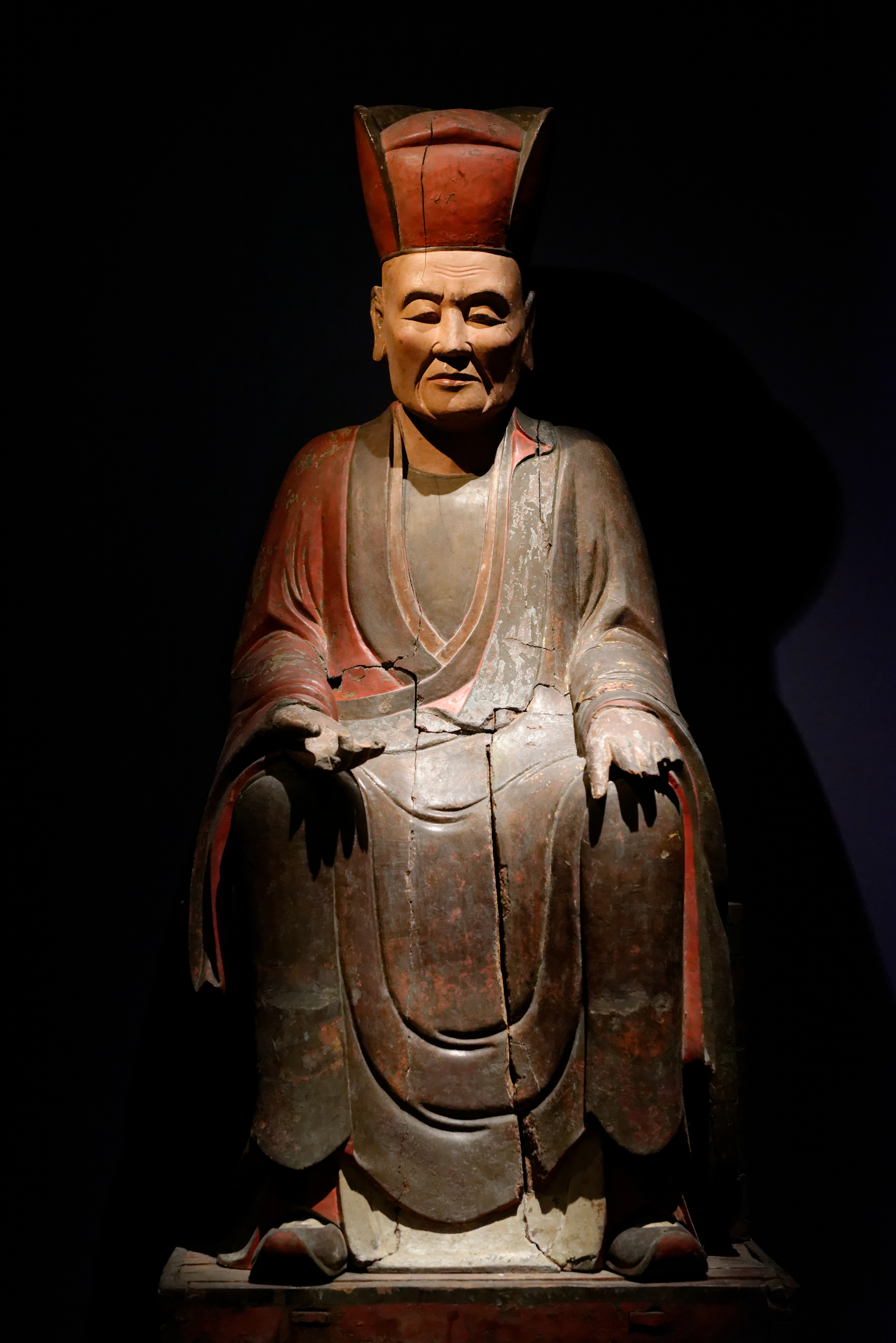
Zen master Tuyên Anh, founder of a Buddhist monastery in Hanoi, Lê or Nguyễn dynasty

A major development under the Trần dynasty (1010-1225) was the establishment of the Trúc Lâm school of Zen. Emperor Trần Nhân Tông founded this sect after leaving his family in 1299, becoming its first ancestor. Monk Phap Loa and Monk Huyen Quang were the second and third ancestors, respectively. Existing historical documents on the origin of the Trúc Lâm sect are not fully clear. Emperor Trần Thái Tông (r. 1226–58) was a significant figure, writing several Buddhist articles and texts collected in Khóa Hư Lục (Instructions on Emptiness). His works included discussions on repentance (Lục Thời Sám Hối Khoa Nghi, Bình Đẳng Lễ Sám Văn) and observing precepts (Thụ Giới Luận, Giới Định Tuệ Luận). Thái Tông's views on meditation differed from Huineng's concept of simultaneous enlightenment, favoring a graduated path.

In the 15th century, the Later Lê dynasty (1428 to 1789), imitating Chinese emperors, privileged Neo-Confucianism and integrated Buddhism further into the state system, leading to state controls on Buddhism. During the later dynastic era Buddhism was increasingly critiqued by Neo-Confucian officials, such as Lê Quát, though it remained popular with the masses. Buddhism also influenced the thought of certain intellectuals, such as Nguyễn Bỉnh Khiêm (1491–1585), an influential poet and philosopher who drew from Daoism, Buddhism and Neoconfucianism. His thought saw the three teachings as different ways of cultivating the Way. Other elite scholars like Nguyễn Trãi, Lương Thế Vinh, and Emperor Lê Thánh Tông (born 1607) also wrote Buddhist works. Emperor Lê Thánh Tông is known for his descriptions of hon (forsaken spirits) trapped in 'aimless wandering' due to having suffered an injustice in their past life. His work, Thập Giới Cô Hồn Quốc Ngữ Văn, on forsaken spirits, was inspired by the Buddhist work Khóa Mông Sơn Thí Thực. While both works deal with the same topic and source, Lê Thánh Tông excluded monarchs, lords, and warriors from the categories of forsaken spirits in his work. These works demonstrate that even while Buddhism lost political influence, it still significantly affected popular thought and appeared in scholarly and popular writings.

The late period of Vietnamese dynastic history (16th century to the early 19th century) is marked by the fragmentation of centralized authority and constant conflict between the weakened Lê dynasty, and numerous other Vietnamese dynastic powers, including the Mạc dynasty, the Trịnh lords, and the Nguyễn lords. This era is characterized by nominal imperial legitimacy under the Lê emperors, while real power was exercised by regional warlords. During this time, Buddhism continued to be promoted by some regional lords and intellectuals and continued to be widely practiced at the local level.

=== Nguyễn dynasty and early modern period ===
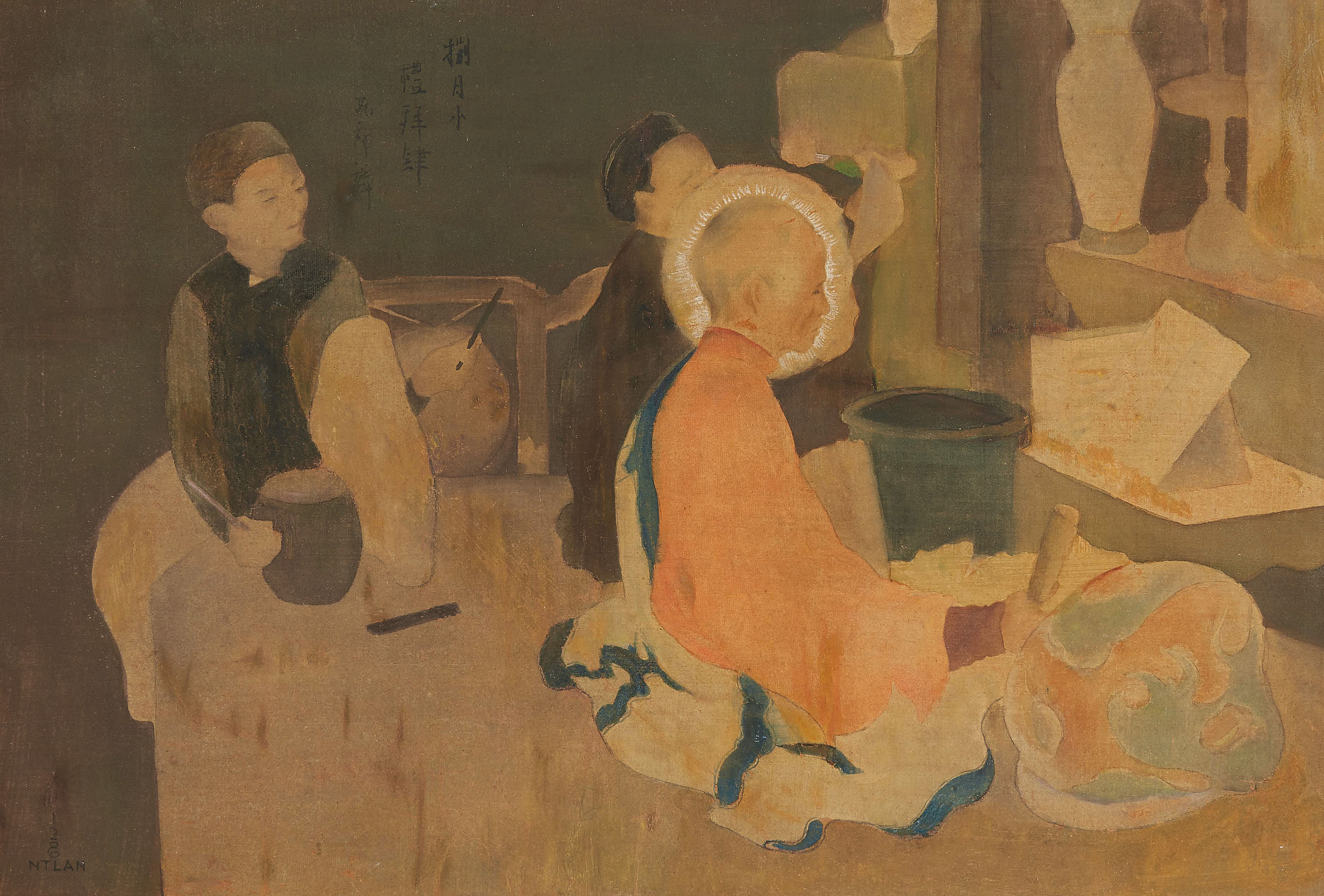
Nguyễn Tường Lân, A La Pagode, 1935

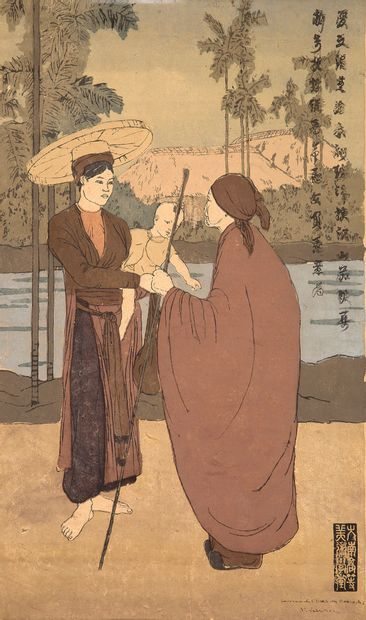
Nhất Linh,La Tonkinoise Et La Vieille Sage, 1926

Tumultuous events in the latter half of the 18th century, such as peasant insurrections and the overthrow of regimes, created a mindset where Confucianism was no longer adequate, necessitating a new synthesis of the Three Teachings (Buddhism, Confucianism, Taoism). Scholar Ngô Thì Nhậm attempted this synthesis, though his ideas remained underpinned by Confucianism. He wrote several works, including Trúc Lâm Tông Chỉ Nguyên Thanh, dealing specifically with Buddhism. The Buddhist monk Toan Nhat was considered more successful, producing the work The Tale of Hua Su. This work, divided into four parts, incorporates Buddhist ideas and introduces themes unprecedented in Vietnamese literature, including anti-royalism (positing the teacher as more important than the emperor or parents), the necessary relation of labor to truth and mercy, and the necessary relation of armed struggle to authentic compassion. It contains episodes reflecting the epoch's realities, like war and injustice, and integrates Buddhist morality into contemporary thought.

It was not until the 19th century that Buddhism regained some stature under the Nguyễn dynasty (1802–1945), which accorded royal support. While the Nguyễn dynasty (1802-early 20th century) was characterized by a resurgent Confucianism, Buddhism still thrived during this time, and its influence can be seen in the elite literature of the time. Buddhist monks and nuns also worked hard to collect, compile and print the Vietnamese Buddhist canon, which included unique Vietnamese Buddhist works and histories. Some key figures involved in this work included Phuc Dien, An Thien, Thanh Dam, and Dieu Nghiem.

During the period of the Nguyễn dynasty as a protectorate of France (1887–1954), Buddhism developed an engaged Buddhist tendency towards a pro-active commitment to seeking solutions for sociopolitical problems. Despite the traditional Buddhist focus on release from the mundane world, monks made heroic contributions to anti-colonial insurrections. Examples include Vương Quốc Chính and Van Tru leading the 1898 revolt and Nguyễn Hữu Trí leading the 1916 revolt. Võ Trứ organized resistance between 1893–94, and Cao Văn Long spearheaded the 1916 attack on Saigon. Vuong Quoc Chinh, a Confucian scholar and Buddhist devotee, led the 1898 attack on Hanoi, mobilizing patriotic forces under religious cover.

A Buddhist revival movement (Chấn hưng Phật giáo) emerged in the 1920s in an effort to reform and strengthen institutional Buddhism, which had lost grounds to the spread of Christianity and the growth of other faiths during the French protectorate period. The movement continued into the 1950s and the republican era.

This Buddhist revival movement used vernacular Vietnamese for communication, publishing ideas in newspapers and magazines rather than relying solely on traditional Chinese texts. Buddhist reformers debated doctrinal questions and the religion's relationship with society, the nation, and science. The movement originated in Saigon, influenced by its exposure to modern currents and publications, including Pháp Âm and Phật Hóa Tân Thanh Niên (the first Buddhist periodicals in modern Vietnamese). Figures like Thiện Chiếu agitated for reform, publishing Phật Học Tổng Yếu (A General Summary of Buddhism) in 1929, which introduced novel ideas and took a critical stance against blind adherence to convention. This work sparked debates in various newspapers. The writings of monks like Thiện Chiếu were seen as an ideological prelude to the formation of large Buddhist organizations. Between 1930 and 1933, four Buddhist research associations were established in the South, including the Hội Nam Kỳ Nghiên Cứu Phật Học in Saigon, led by dignitaries such as Khánh Hòa, Huệ Quang, and Trí Thiền, and including figures like Tran Nguyen Chan. These associations published magazines (Từ Bi Âm, Bát Nhã Âm), collected texts, and opened schools. Laymen such as Nguyễn Năng Quốc, Thiều Chửu, and Trần Trọng Kim also played important roles. Buddhist associations in Northern and Central Vietnam also formed, with rapidly growing memberships. Although a nationwide association was prevented by the French, regional groups developed cooperation. Some Confucian scholars also supported the Buddhist movement and the publication of Buddhist papers. In order to manage the movement, the French officials placed key figures like Tran Nguyen Chan and Nguyễn Năng Quốc in leadership roles under French supervision.

=== Republican period ===
From 1954 to 1975, Vietnam was split into North and South Vietnam. In a country where surveys of the religious composition estimated the Buddhist majority to be approximately 70 to 80 percent, South Vietnamese President Ngô Đình Diệm's policies generated claims of religious bias. As a member of the Catholic Vietnamese minority, he pursued pro-Catholic policies that antagonized many Buddhists.

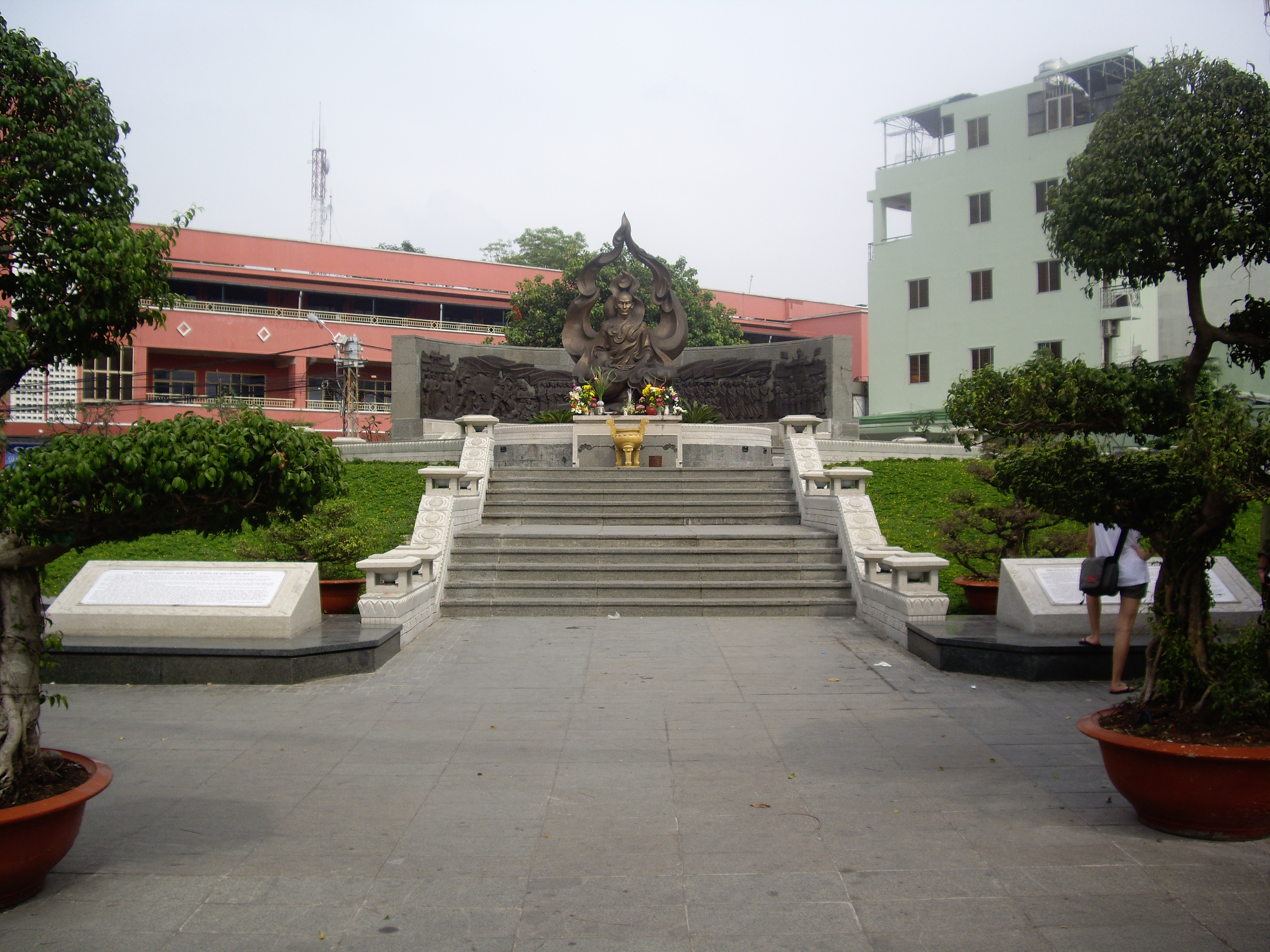
Monument to Thích Quảng Đức, who burned himself to death in 1963 in protest against the persecution of Buddhists by South Vietnam's Ngô Đình Diệm administration

On 22 December 1953, the State of Vietnam recognized the Vietnamese Pure Land Buddhist Laity Association.

In May 1963, in the central city of Huế, where Diệm's elder brother Ngô Đình Thục was the archbishop, Buddhists were prohibited from displaying Buddhist flags during Vesak celebrations. Yet few days earlier, Catholics were allowed to fly religious flags at a celebration in honor of the newly seated archbishop. This led to widespread protest against the government; troops were sent in, and nine civilians were killed in the confrontations. This led to mass rallies against Diệm's government, termed as the Buddhist crisis. The conflicts culminated in Thích Quảng Đức's self-immolation by lighting himself on fire in protest of the persecution of Buddhists. President Diệm's younger brother Ngô Đình Nhu favored strong-armed tactics, and Army of the Republic of Vietnam Special Forces engaged in the Xá Lợi Pagoda raids, killing estimated hundreds. Dismayed by the public outrage, the U.S. government withdrew support for the regime. President Diệm was deposed and killed in the 1963 coup.

Political strength of the Buddhists grew in the 1960s as different schools and orders convene to form the Unified Buddhist Sangha of Vietnam. Leaders of the Sangha like Thích Trí Quang had considerable sway in national politics, at times challenging the government.

With the fall of Saigon in 1975, the whole nation came under Communist rule; many religious practices including Buddhism were discouraged. In the North, the government had created the United Buddhist Sangha of Vietnam, co-opting the clergy to function under government auspices, but in the South, the Unified Buddhist Sangha of Vietnam still held sway and openly challenged the communist government. The Sangha leadership was thus arrested and imprisoned; Sangha properties were seized and the Sangha itself was outlawed. In its place was the newly created Buddhist Sangha of Vietnam, designed as the final union of all Buddhist organizations, now under full state control.

=== Socialist Republic of Vietnam ===
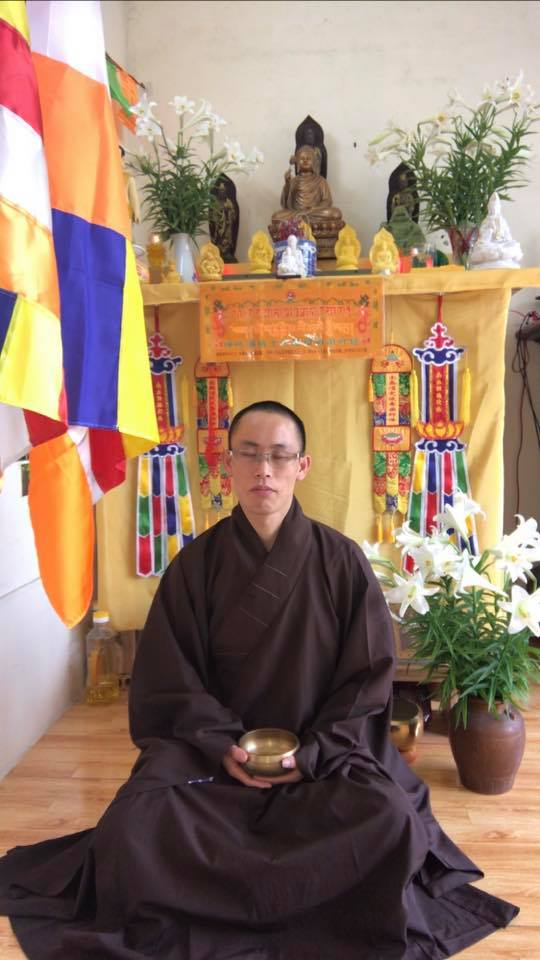
A young Buddhist monk in Vietnam

The treatment of Buddhists started to ease since the reform era (Đổi mới) began in 1986. Since the Đổi Mới reforms, many reforms have allowed Buddhists to practice their religion relatively unhindered. However, no organized sangha is allowed to function independent of the state. It was not until 2007 that Pure Land Buddhism, the most widespread type of Buddhism practiced in Vietnam, was officially recognized as a religion by the government. Thích Quảng Độ, the Patriarch of the Unified Buddhist Sangha, once imprisoned, remained under surveillance and restricted in his travels until his death.

Today, Buddhists are found throughout Vietnam, from North to South. Buddhism is the single largest organized religion in Vietnam, with somewhere between 45% and 55% of the population identifying themselves as Buddhist. Some argued that the number is higher than reported, as many declared themselves as atheists but still participate in Buddhist activities.

Though the Communist Party of Vietnam officially promotes atheism, it has usually leaned in favor of Buddhism, as Buddhism is associated with the long and deep history of Vietnam. Also, there have rarely been disputes between Buddhists and the Government; the Communist Government also sees Buddhism as a symbol of Vietnamese patriotism. Buddhist festivals are officially promoted by the Government and restrictions are few, in contrast to its Christian, Muslim and other religious counterparts.

Recently, the Communist regime in Vietnam allowed major Buddhist figures to enter the country. Thích Nhất Hạnh, an influential Buddhist figure revered both in Vietnam and worldwide, is among these. Distancing itself from the fellow communist neighbor China, the Government of Vietnam allows the publishing of books and stories of 14th Dalai Lama, who has a personal friendship with Thích Nhất Hạnh and were commonly critical of the Chinese regime after the 2008 Tibetan unrest, which was seen as an attempt to antagonize the Chinese Government and China as a whole, as Beijing still considers the Dalai Lama to be a terrorist.

The Vietnam Buddhist Sangha has placed much emphasis on promoting Buddhism to remote areas and ethnic minorities beyond the native Kinh people group, in contrary to other Buddhist governing body in the region. These efforts has given rise to more ethnic minorities embracing Buddhism in remote areas, especially in the Central Highlands region of Vietnam.

For example, Buddhists adherent in the Kon Tum province, a traditionally non-Buddhist region has grown to host 30,000 Buddhists since arriving in the 1930s, with 4,000 of them being of ethnic minority. There are 27 Pagodas and 6 Viharas in the region with 90 active Buddhist monastics today.

Separately, Dak Lak province of Vietnam has also seen a rise in Buddhist adherent with about 3,000 adherents coming from ethnic minority such as the E De people group.

=== Overseas ===
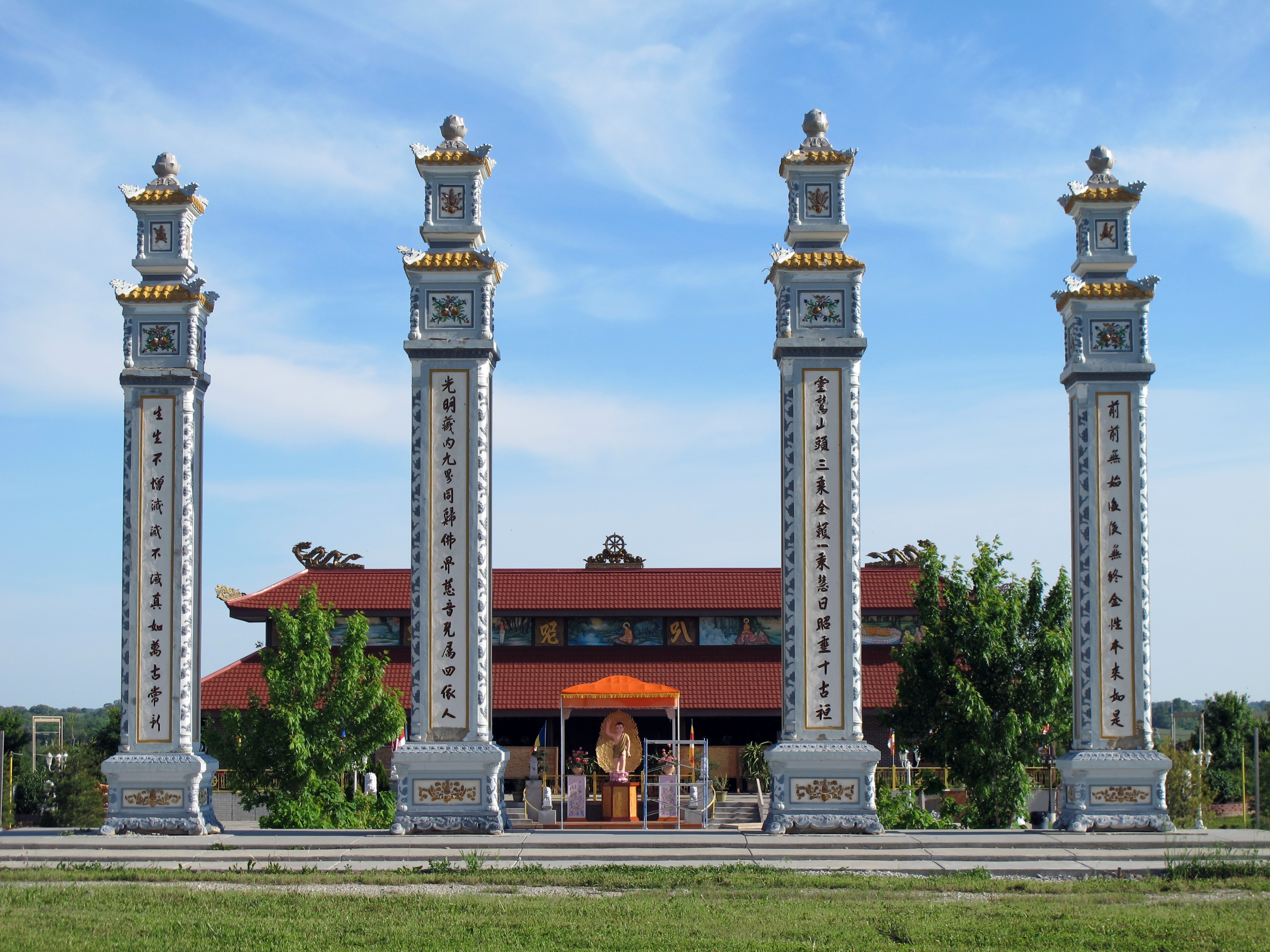
Linh Quang Buddhist Center, Nebraska, USA

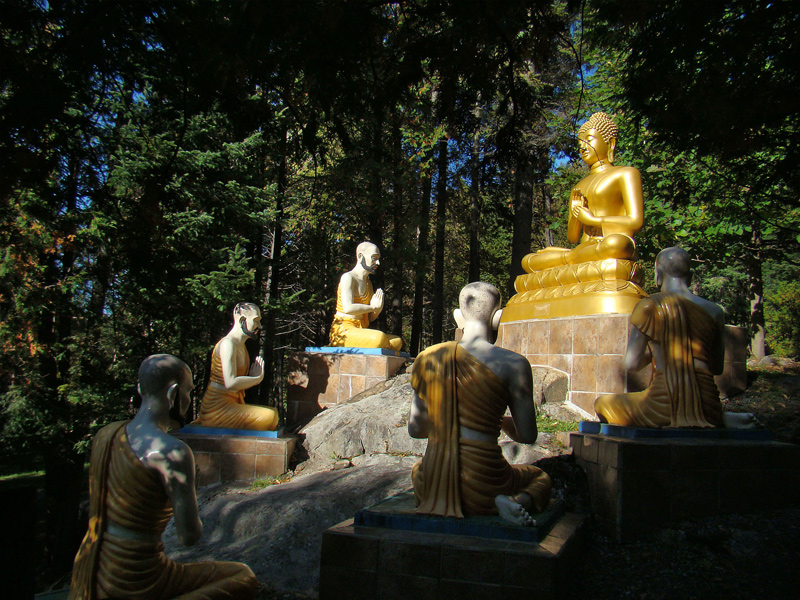
Buddhist Monastery of Tam Bao Son, Harrington, Quebec, Canada

After the fall of South Vietnam to the Communist North in 1975 at the end of the Vietnam War, the first major Buddhist community appeared in North America. Since this time, the North American Vietnamese Buddhist community has grown to some 160 temples and centers. Proselytizing is not a priority.

The most famous practitioner of synchronized Vietnamese Thiền in the West is Thích Nhất Hạnh, who has authored dozens of books and founded the Plum Village Monastery in France together with his colleague, bhikṣuṇī and Zen Master Chân Không. According to Nguyen and Barber, Thích Nhất Hạnh's fame in the Western world as a proponent of engaged Buddhism and a new Thiền style has "no affinity with or any foundation in traditional Vietnamese Buddhist practices", and according to Alexander Soucy (2007), his style of Zen Buddhism is not reflective of actual Vietnamese Buddhism. These claims are contradicted by Elise Anne DeVido, who examined the life and legacy of Thích Nhất Hạnh and how we can understand his teachings in terms of its Vietnamese origins. Thích Nhất Hạnh also often recounts about his early Thiền practices in Vietnam in his Dharma talks, saying that he continued and developed this practice in the West, which has a distinctive Vietnamese Thiền flavor.

Thích Nhất Hạnh's Buddhist teachings have started to return to Vietnam, where the Buddhist landscape is now being shaped by the combined Vietnamese and Westernized Buddhism that is focused more on the meditative practices.

=== Revival of Buddhism ===
At the beginning of the 20th century, in response to the Buddhist revival movements in other countries, Vietnamese monks also advocated for the revitalization of Buddhism in Vietnam, which grew significantly across all three regions. This led to the establishment of modern Vietnamese Buddhism, and Buddhism gradually regained its rightful position, though it still was not the state religion in Vietnam.

Buddhism in each period of Vietnamese history has had the support of prominent scholars and figures. The Chánh Pháp magazine (issue 165) mentions the intellectual elites who accompanied Vietnamese Buddhism, including: the Zhuangyuan Lý Đạo Tái, Zhuangyuan Lê Ích Mộc, Vice Grand-Chancellor of Đại Việt Vũ Trinh, lay Buddhist and doctor Lê Đình Thám, Venerable Thích Minh Châu, Lê Mạnh Thát, and visual artist–valedictorian Vũ Tú. These individuals were the intellectual cream of their era, choosing to propagate the Dharma through wisdom and exceptional character. They embody the union of spiritual and worldly life, demonstrating a practical engagement with the world while remaining spiritually pure and detached – a shining pride in the flow of both Vietnamese Buddhism and intellectual heritage.

== Practice ==
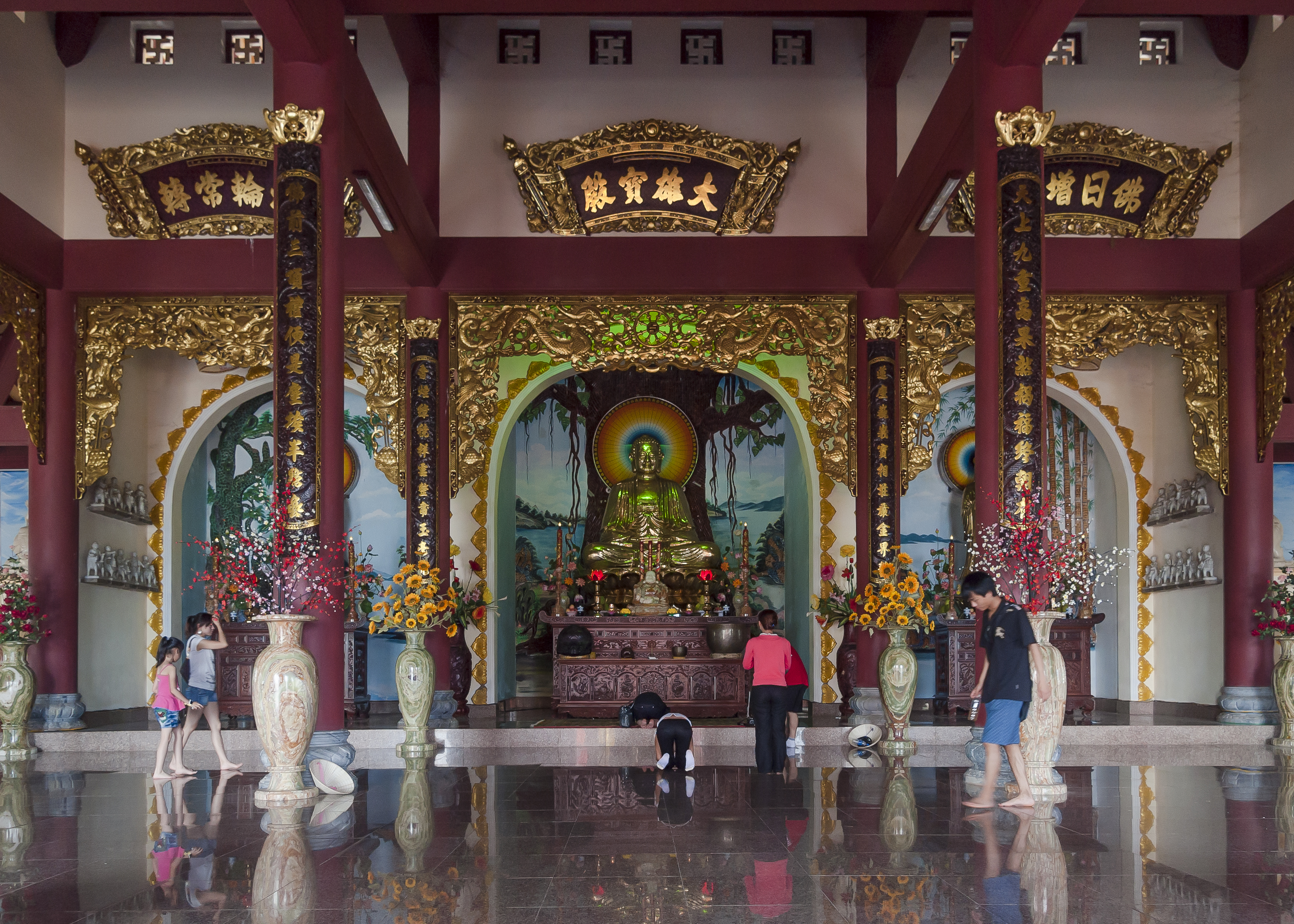
Buddha hall in a temple at Da Nang.

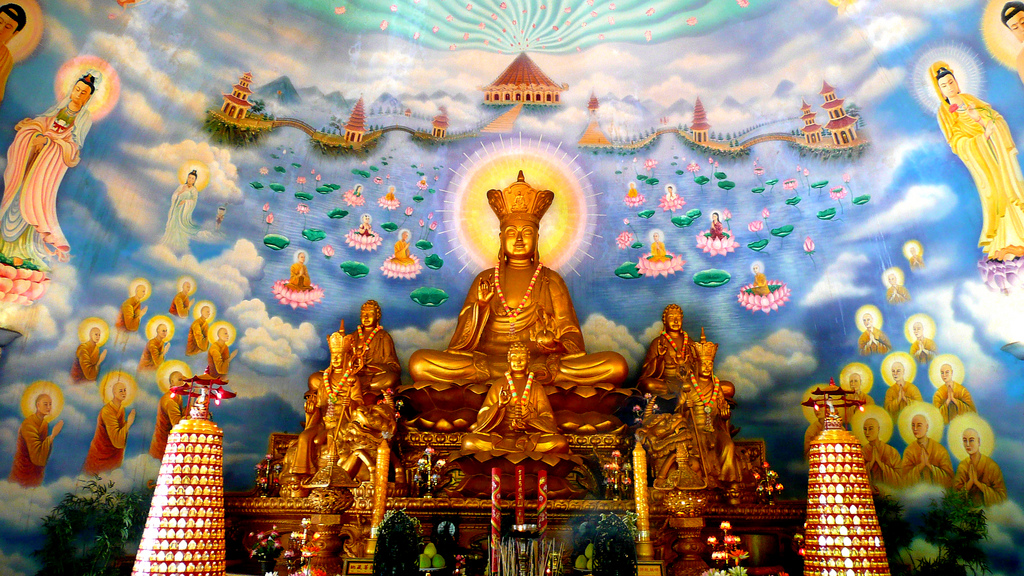
Statue of Kṣitigarbha bodhisattva and Vietnamese art of the pure land.

Followers in Vietnam practice differing traditions without any problem or sense of contradiction. Few Vietnamese Buddhists would identify themselves as a particular kind of Buddhism, as a Christian might identify themself by a denomination, for example. Although Vietnamese Buddhism does not have a strong centralized structure, the practice is similar throughout the country at almost any temple.

Gaining merit is the most common and essential practice in Vietnamese Buddhism with a belief that liberation takes place with the help of Buddhas and bodhisattvas. Buddhist monks commonly chant sutras, recite Buddhas' names (particularly Amitābha), doing repentance, and praying for rebirth in the Pure Land.

The Lotus Sutra and the Amitabha Sutra are the most commonly used sutras. Most sutras and texts are in Văn ngôn and are merely recited with Sino-Xenic pronunciations, making them incomprehensible to most practitioners.

Three services are practiced regularly at dawn, noon, and dusk. They include sutra reading with niệm Phật and dhāraṇī, including the Chú Đại Bi (the Nīlakaṇṭha Dhāraṇī), recitation and kinh hành (walking meditation). Laypeople at times join the services at the temple, and some devout Buddhist practice the services at home. Special services such as sám nguyện/sám hối (confession/repentance) takes place on the full moon and new moon each month. The niệm Phật practice is one way of repenting and purifying bad karma.

Buddhist temples also serve a significant role in death rituals and funerals among overseas Vietnamese.

=== The Great Compassion Dharani ===
At the entrance of many pagodas, especially in tourist places, the Great Compassion Dharani (Vietnamese version of the Chinese 大悲咒 Dàbēi zhòu, the Nīlakaṇṭha Dhāraṇī or Great Compassion Dharani or Mantra), is made available to visitors, either printed on a single sheet in black and white, or as a color booklet on glossy paper. They are printed on the initiative of Buddhist practitioners who make an offering to the sangha.

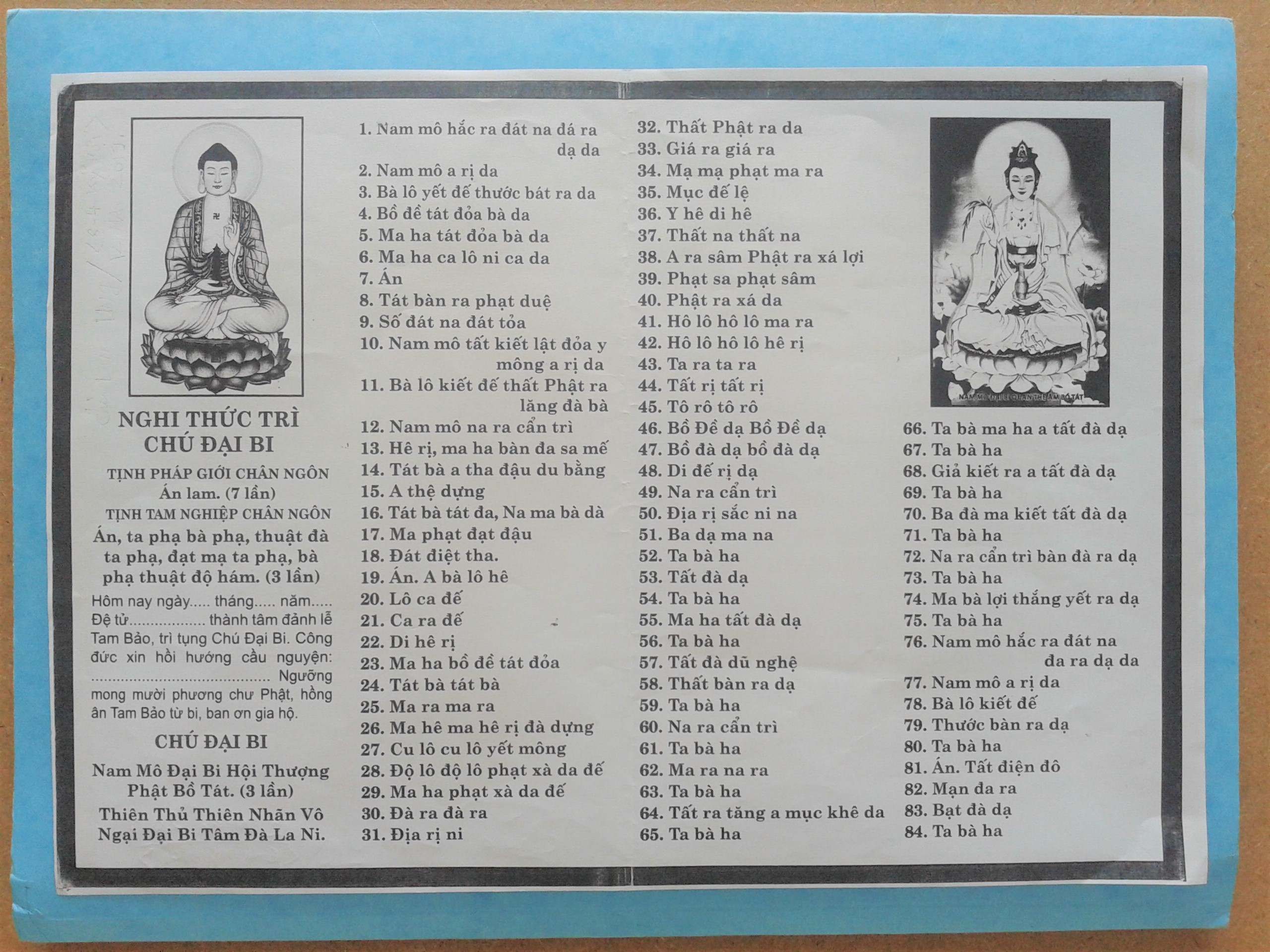
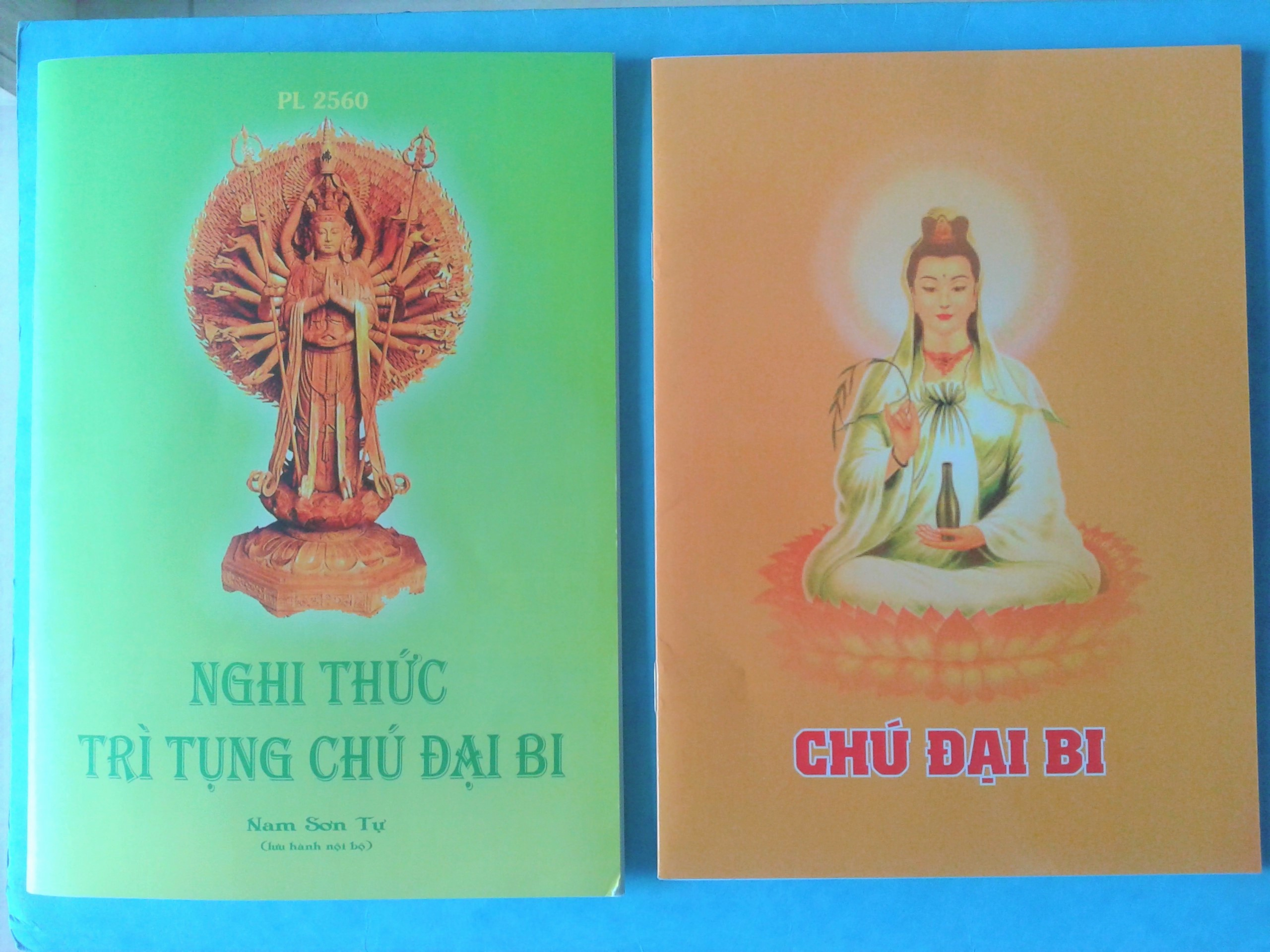
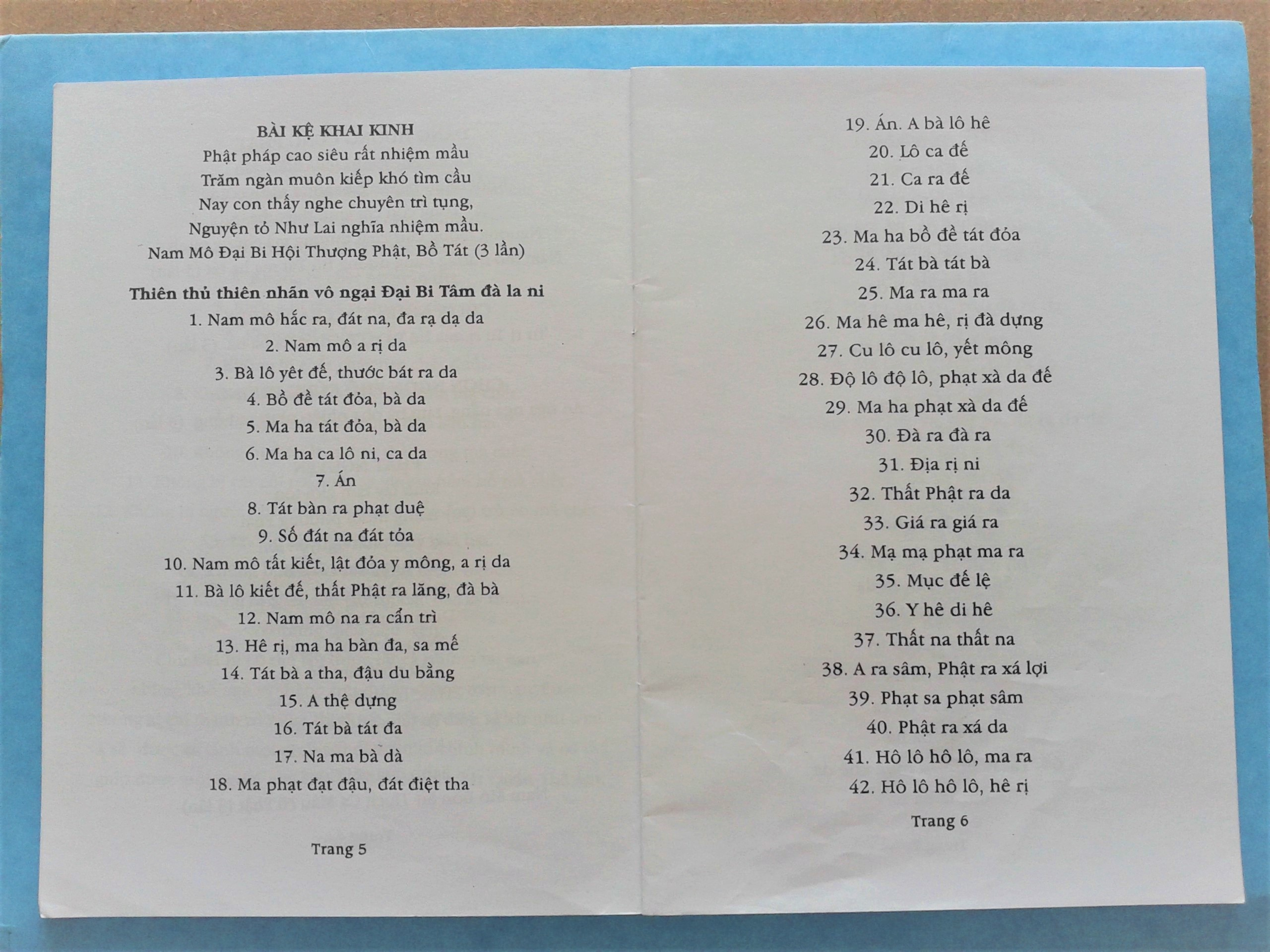
Description of illustrations:
• Left: Sheet of plain paper (21x29.7 cm). Complete text of Chú Đại Bi, ie 84 verses, printed in black and white. At the top of the page, on both sides, are the representations of Buddha A Di Đà (Amitābha) and Bodhisattva Quán Âm (Guanyin).
• Center: Two booklets, first covers, flexible cardboard (21x14.5 cm). - Green colored copy , 32 p. : Quan Âm (or Quán Thế Âm Bồ Tát) is standing on a lotus. She is represented in her form with twenty-four arms and eleven faces: hers, the others symbolizing the ten directions of space (the four cardinal directions, the four intercardinal directions, the nadir and the zenith, that the Boddhisattva can observe simultaneously.)
The meaning (and not the literal translation) of the words " Nghi Thức Trì Tụng " is: " Instructions for reciting well the Chú Đại Bi".
• Right: An open booklet. We can read the numbered verses 1-42 of the "Chú Đại Bi", that is to say half of the full text.
Note : one of the booklets has more pages (32) than the other (12) because it is more illustrated and contains ritual instructions (as indicated on the front cover).

Click on images to enlarge

- Text

The Chú Đại Bi (Vietnamese translation of the Chinese title 大悲咒 Dàbēi zhòu), is divided into 84 verses and available in either unnumbered or numbered versions. The text recited in religious services is a transcription into modern Vietnamese (Chữ Quốc ngữ) from the ancient Vietnamese (Chữ Nôm and Chữ Hán) text, which was itself a transcription from Chinese (not a traduction). The following translations into modern Vietnamese and English are based on the work of Vietnamese historian Lê Tự Hỷ and Indian historian Lokesh Chandra. A reconstruction in Sanskrit IAST from the original text, by Lê Tự Hỷ, is also proposed.

Chú Đại Bi
1 & 2. Transcription and traduction from ancient Vietnamese (Chữ Nôm and Chữ Hán) to modern Vietnamese (Chữ Quốc ngữ) and translation in English.
3. Reconstructed text in Sanskrit IAST.

* 1. Text without the numbering of the verses.
The following text is the transcription into modern Vietnamese (chữ Quốc ngữ) from Old Vietnamese (Chữ Nôm and Chữ Hán) version, itself a transliteration from the Chinese 大悲咒 Dàbēi zhòu :

Nam mô hắc ra đát na đa ra dạ da. Nam mô a rị da, bà lô yết đế, thước bác ra da, bồ đề tát đỏa bà da, ma ha tát đỏa bà da, ma ha ca lô ni ca da. Án tát bàn ra phạt duệ, số đát na đá tỏa.

Nam mô tất kiết lật đỏa, y mông a rị da bà lô kiết đế, thất phật ra lăng đà bà.
Nam mô na ra cẩn trì hế rị, ma ha bàn đá sa mế, tát bà a tha đậu du bằng a thể dựng, tát bà tát đa, na ma bà gìa ma phạt đạt đậu, đát thiệt tha. Án, a bà lô hê, lô ca đế, ca ra đế, di hê rị, ma ha bồ đề tát đỏa, tát bà tát bà, ma ra ma ra, ma hê ma hê, rị đàn dựng cu lô cu lô kiết mông độ lô độ lô, phạt xà da đế, ma ha phạt xà da đế, đà ra đà ra, địa rị ni, thất Phật ra da, dá ra dá ra. Mạ mạ phạt ma ra, mục đế lệ, y hê y hê, thất na thất na, a ra sâm Phật ra xá lợi, phạt sa phạt sâm, Phật ra xá da, hô lô hô lô ma ra, hô lô hô lô hê rị, ta ra ta ra, tất rị tất rị, tô rô tô rô bồ đề dạ, bồ đề dạ, bồ đà dạ, bồ đà dạ, di đế rị dạ, na ra cẩn trì địa rị sắc ni na, ba dạ ma na ta bà ha. Tất đà dạ ta bà ha. Ma ha tất đà dạ ta bà ha. Tất đà du nghệ thất bàn ra dạ ta bà ha. Na ra cẩn trì. Ta bà ha. Ma ra na ra. Ta bà ha. Tất ra tăng a mục khê da, ta bà ha. Ta bà ma ha a tất đà dạ ta bà ha. Gỉa kiết ra a tất đà dạ ta bà ha. Ba đà ma yết tất đà dạ, ta bà ha. Na ra cẩn trì bàn dà ra dạ ta bà ha. Ma bà lị thắng yết ra dạ ta bà ha.

Nam mô hắc ra đát na đá ra mạ da, Nam mô a rị da bà lô yết đế, thước bàn ra dạ, ta bà ha. Án tất điện đô, mạn đa ra, bạt đà dạ, ta bà ha.

- 2. Text with the verses numbered from 1 to 84, then translated into modern Vietnamese and English:

-01. Nam mô hát (hoặc: hắc) ra đát na đá ra dạ da → Kính lạy Tam Bảo (Homage to the Three Jewels)
-02. Nam mô A rị a → Kính lạy Chư Thánh hiền (Homage to ārya)
-03. Bà lô yết đế thước bát ra da → Avalokiteśvara (Avalokiteśvara)
-04. Bồ đề Tát đá bà da→ Bồ Đề Tát (Boddhisatva)
-05. Ma ha Tát đá bà da → Sự vị đại (Mahāsattva)
-06. Ma ha ca lô ni ca da → Lòng Từ Bi vĩ đại (The Great Compassionate One)
-07. Án → Án (Oṃ)
-08. Tát bàn ra phạt duệ → Người bảo vệ khỏi mọi nguy hiểm (Protector from all dangers)
-09. Số đát na đát tả → Vượt qua nỗi sợ hãi (Overcoming fear)
-10. Nam mô tất cát lị đóa y mông A rị a → Kính lạy và sùng bái chư Thánh Thiên (Homage and adoration to ārya)
-11. Bà lô cát đế thất phật ra lăng đà bà → Avalokisteśvara (Avalokisteśvara)
-12. Nam mô Na ra cẩn trì → Kính lạy Nīlakaṇṭha (tên= Cổ Xanh ) (Homage to Nīlakaṇṭha (name= Blue throat)
-13. Ha rị Ma ha Bàn đà sa mế → Con sẽ tụng lên bài Tâm Chú (I shall enunciate the heart (dharani)
-14. 'Tát bà a tha đậu thâu bằng → Làm cho tất cả chúng sinh chiến thắng (Make all beings victorious)
-15. A thệ dựng → Bất khả chiến bại (Invincible)
-16. Tát bá tát đá ( Na ma bà tát đá) → Loại bỏ những ảo tưởng thanh lọc tất cả chúng sinh (Which removes illusions and purifies all beings)
-17. Ma phạt đặc đậu → Trên những con đường của sự tồn tại (On the path of existence')
-18. Đát điệt tha. Án → Là như sau (Thus. Om)
-19. A bà lô hê →Ánh huy hoàng (Glorious Light)
-20. Lô ca đế → Siêu việt (Transcendence)
-21. Ca la đế (hoặc) Ca ra đế) → Chiếu sáng (Radiance)
-22. Di Hê rị (hoặc : Ha ri) → Ôi Harị (là 1 trong các tên của Vishnu) (O Hari (one of the names of Vishnu))
-23. Ma ha Bồ đề tát đỏa → Chư Đại Bồ Tát (The Great Bodhisattva)
-24. Tát bà Tát bà → Tất cả chúng sinh (All sentient beings)
-25. Ma ra Ma ra → Hãy nhớ, hãy nhớ … (Remember, remember…)
-26. Ma hê Ma hê rị đà dựng → …bài Tâm Chú của con (… my Heart dhāraṇī)
-27. Câu lô câu lô yết mông → Hành động, hãy hành động (Take action, let's act)
-28. Độ lô độ lô, Phạt sà da đế → Tiếp tục, hãy tiếp tục, Cho đến khi chiến thắng (Keep going, keep going, Until you win)
-29. Ma ha phạt sà da đế → Chiến thắng vẻ vang (A glorious victory )
-30. Đà ra đà ra → Giữ chặt (Hold tight, hold tight)
-31. Địa rị ni → Hỡi Đức Vua … (O King …)
-32. Thất Phật ra da → … Của Địa Cầu— (… of the Earth)
-33. Da ra Da ra (hoặc : Giá ra Gia rá) → Tiến lên Tiến lên (Go ahead Go ahead)
-34. Ma ma phạt ma ra → Thần tượng … (God …)
-35. Mục đế lệ → … không tì vết ... (… flawless ...)
-36. Di hê di hê → ... hãy đến, hãy đến ... (...come, come ...)
-37. Thất na Thất na → ...với con rắn màu đen … (...with a black snake …)
-38. A ra sấm Phật ra xá lị → … phá hủy … ( …that destroys …)
-39. Phạt sa phạt sấm → …chất độc ... ( …poisons)
-40. Phật ra xá da → ... Đấng Tối cao (O Supreme Being)
-41. Hô lô Hô lô ma ra → Xin nhanh lên, xin nhanh lên, hỡi Ngài Dũng Mãnh (Quick, Quick O Strong Being)
-42. Hô lô Hô lô hê rị → Xin nhanh lên, Xin nhanh lên, hỡi Ngài Hari (Quick, Quick O Hari)
-43. Ta ra Ta ra (hoặc : Sa ra, Sa ra) → Hãy xuống, Hãy xuống (Come down Come down)
-44. Tất lị Tất lị → Đến, Đến (Come, Come)
-45. Tô lô Tô lô → Hạ cố Hạ cố (Condescend, Condescend)
-46. Bồ đề dạ Bồ đề dạ → Bậc đã giác ngộ Bậc đã giác ngộ (Being enlightened, Being enlightened)
-47. Bồ đà dạ Bồ đà dạ → Xin ngài hãy giác ngộ con, Xin ngài hãy giác ngộ con (Please enlighten me, Please enlighten me
-48. Di đế rị dạ → Nhân từ (Benevolent)
-49. Na ra cẩn trì → Nīlakaṇṭha (Nīlakaṇṭha )
-50. Địa rị sắt ni na → Xin ngài hãy làm cho tim con an lạc … (Please gladden my heart …)
-51. Ba dạ ma na → … bằng cách hiện ra trong tim con (… by appearing unto me)
-52. Ta bà ha (hoặc : Sa bà ha) → Con xin đón mừng Ngài (I welcome you)
-53. Tất đà dạ → Sư phụ đã hoàn thành (To the accomplished Master)
-54. Ta bà ha → Con xin đón mừng Ngài (I welcome you)
-55. Ma ha Tất đà dạ → Người Thầy vĩ đại đã hoàn thành (The Great accomplished Master)
-56. Ta bà ha → Con xin đón mừng Ngài (I welcome you)
-57. Tất bà dụ nghệ Tâm trí hoàn toàn … (Perfect mind …)
-58. Thất phàn ra da → … giác ngộ ( … fully enlightened)
-59. Ta bà ha → Con xin đón mừng Ngài (I welcome you)
-60. Na ra cẩn trì → Nīlakaṇṭha (Nīlakaṇṭha )
-61. Ta bà ha → Con xin đón mừng Ngài (I welcome you)
-62. Ma ra na ra → Người có gương mặt Heo rừng đực (To the One with a face of a Wild Boar )
-63. Ta bà ha → Con xin đón mừng Ngài (I welcome you)
-64. Tất ra tăng a Mục da da → Người có gương mặt Sư tử (To the One with a face of a Lion )
-65. Ta bà ha → Con xin đón mừng Ngài (I welcome you)
-66. Sa bà ma ha a tất đà dạ → Người mang trong tay cái chùy (To the One with a gada in the hand)
-67. Ta bà ha → Con xin đón mừng Ngài (I welcome you)
-68. Giả cát ra a tất đà dạ → Người cầm trên tay chiếc bánh xe (To the One with a discus in the hand)
-69. Ta bà ha → Con xin đón mừng Ngài (I welcome you)
-70. Ba đà ma yết tất đà dạ→ Người mang trên tay hoa sen (To the One with a lotus in the hand)
-71. Ta bà ha → Con xin đón mừng Ngài (I welcome you)
-72. Na ra cẩn trì Bàn dà ra da → Nīlakaṇṭha, Đấng linh thiêng nhất (Nīlakaṇṭha, The most sacred)
-73. Ta bà ha → Con xin đón mừng Ngài (I welcome you)
-74. Ma bà lị thắng yết ra dạ → Để được mạnh mẽ, để được tốt lành (In order to be strong, in order to be good)
-75. Ta bà ha → Con xin đón mừng Ngài (I welcome you)
-76. Nam mô hát (hoặc: hắc) ra đát na đá ra dạ da → Kính lạy Tam Bảo (Homage to the Three Jewels)
-77. Nam mô A rị a → Kính lạy Chư Thánh hiền (Homage to ārya)
-78. Bà lô yết đế → Avalokite …( phần đầu của tên) (Avalokite … (beginning of name)
-79. thước bát ra da → … svaraya (phần cuối của tên = Avalokiteśvara) ( … svaraya (end of name= Avalokiteśvara)
-80. Ta bà ha → Con xin đón mừng Ngài (I welcome you)
-81. Án. Tất điện đô ... → (xem mục 83) (see verse 83)
-82. ... Mạn đá ra ... → (xem mục 83 ) (see verse 83)
-83. ... Bạt đà da → Cầu xin những lời trì chú trở thành hiện thực (May the wishes of this mantra come true)
-84. Ta bà ha → Con xin đón mừng Ngài (I welcome you).

- 3. Reconstructed text in Sanskrit IAST:

The following is a reconstruction of the text in Sanskrit IAST by the vietnamese historian Lê Tự Hỷ who proposes a division into five parts, close to that of Lokesh Chandra. It is divided into 18 grammatically structured sentences (one can notice that the terms "dhāraṇī" and "mantra" are used alternately).

I. Lời chào mở đầu (Opening greeting) :
-01. Namo ratna-trayāya
-02. Nama āryāvalokiteśvarāya bodhisattvāya mahā-sattvāya mahā-kāruṇikāya
II. Danh hiệu của đức Quán Tự Tại (Title Announcement of the Righteous Quán Tự Tại (One of the Names of Avalokiteśvara in Old Vietnamese )
-03. Oṃ sarva-bhayeṣu trāṇa-karāya tasya namaskṛtvā imam Āryāvalokiteśvara-stavanaṃ Nīlakaṇṭha-nāma
III. Sự tụng lên câu kệ về Công đức của bài Tâm Chú (Benefits of reciting the mantra)
-04. hṛdayaṃ vartayisyāmi sarvārtha-sādhanaṃ śubham
-05. ajeyam sarva-bhūtānām bhava-mārga-viśodhakam
IV. Dhāraṇī (Các câu chú) ( Dhāraṇī (all verses)
-06. Tadyathā: Om Ālokapate lokātikrānta
-07. Ehi Hare mahā-bodhisattva sarpa-sarpa smara- smara mama hṛdayam
-08. Kuru-kuru karma dhuru-dhuru vijayate mahā-vijayate
-09. Dhara-dhara dharaṇī-rāja cala-cala mama vimala-mūrte
-10. ehi ehi kṛṣṇa-sarpopavīta viṣa- viṣaṃ praṇāśaya
-11. Hulu-hulu Malla hulu-hulu Hare sara-sara siri-siri suru-suru
-12. Bodhiya-bodhiya bodhaya-bodhaya maitreya Nīlakaṇṭha darśanena prahlādaya manaḥ svāhā
-13. siddhāya svāhā mahā-siddhāya svāhā siddhayogīśvarāya svāhā
-14. Nīlakaṇṭhāya svāhā varāha-mukhāya svāhā narasiṃha-mukhāya svāhā
-15. Gada-hastāya svāhā cakra-hastāya svāhā padma-hastāya svāhā
-16. Nīlakaṇṭha-vyāghrāya svāhā Mahābali-Śaṅkarāya svāhā
V. Lời chào kết thúc (Final greeting )
-17. Namo ratna-trayāya Nama āryāvalokiteśvarāya bodhisattvāya svāhā
-18. Oṃ sidhyantu me mantra padāni svāhā.

== Branches ==
=== Mahāyāna traditions ===
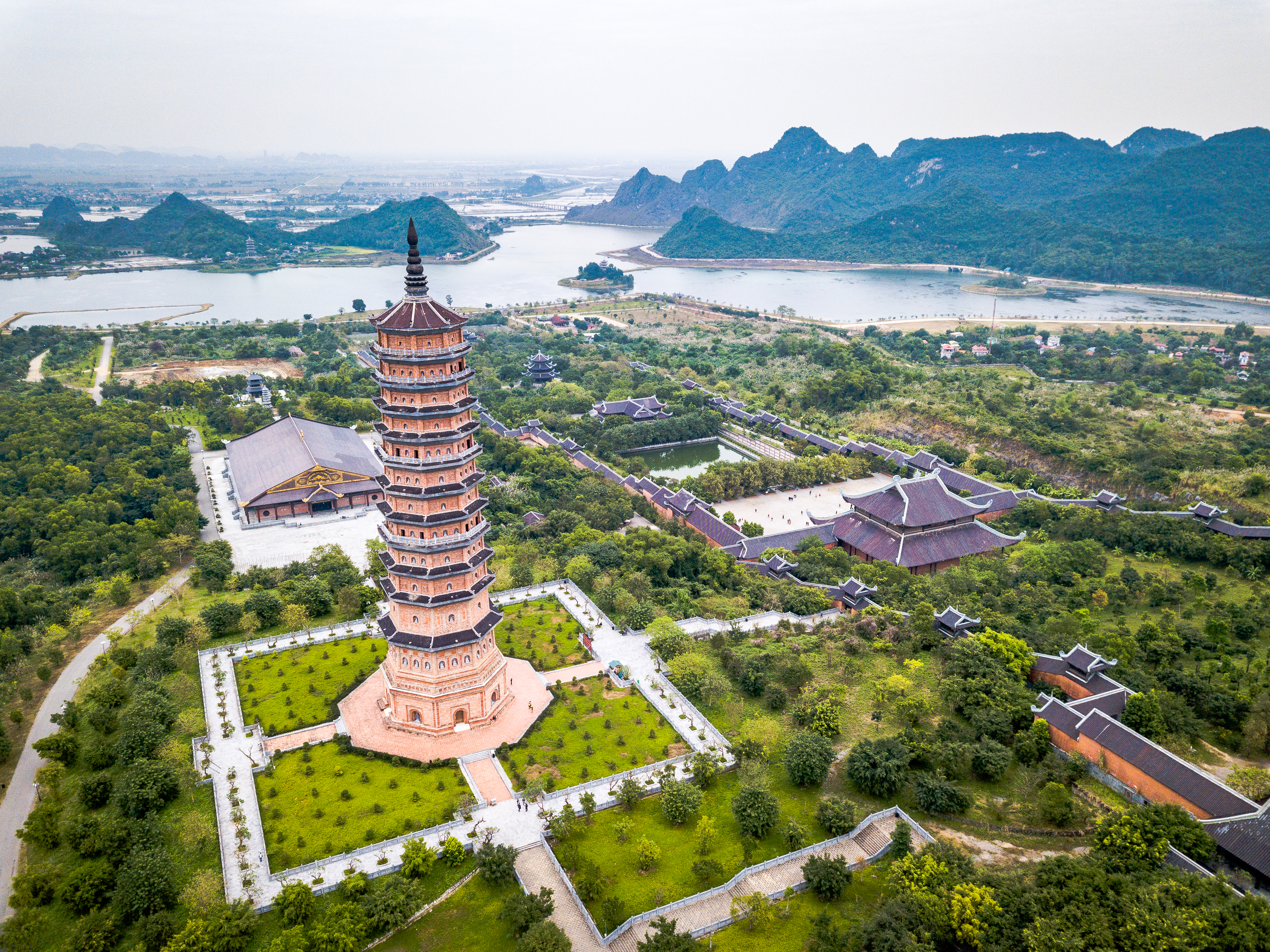
Bái Đính Temple in Ninh Bình Province

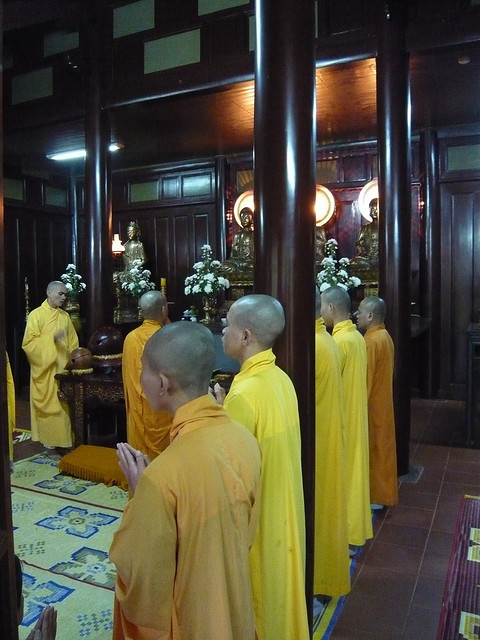
Monks holding a service in Huế

The overall doctrinal position of Vietnamese Buddhism is inclusive and syncretic, adopting doctrines from Chinese Buddhist schools like Tiantai (Thiên Thai) and Huayan (Vietnamese: Hoa Nghiêm). Likewise, modern Vietnamese Buddhist practice can be very eclectic, including elements from Thiền (Chan Buddhism), Thiên Thai, and Tịnh độ (Pure Land).

While there are several sects (or schools) of Vietnamese Buddhism, Vietnamese Buddhists are often separated not by sect but by the style in how they perform and recite texts, which monks of different regions of Vietnam are known for. According to Charles Prebish, many English language sources contain misconceptions regarding the variety of doctrines and practices in traditional Vietnamese Buddhism:

We will not consider here the misconceptions presented in most English-language materials regarding the distinctness of these schools, and the strong inclination for "syncretism" found in Chinese and Vietnamese Buddhism. Much has been said about the incompatibility of different schools and their difficulty in successfully communicating with each other and combining their doctrines. None of these theories reflects realities in Vietnam (or China) past or present. The followers have no problem practicing the various teachings at the same time.

The methods of Pure Land Buddhism are some of the most popular Mahāyāna teachings within Vietnam and are practiced by most traditions. It is common for practitioners to recite sutras, chants and dhāraṇīs looking to gain the protection of Buddhas and bodhisattvas and to attain birth in a pure land. Pure Land Buddhism is a mainly devotional practice where those practicing put their faith in Amitābha (Vietnamese: A-di-đà). Followers believe they will gain rebirth in his pure land by chanting Amitabha's name. A pure land is a Buddha-realm where one can more easily attain enlightenment since suffering does not exist there.

Another key stream of Buddhist teaching and practice in Vietnamese Buddhism is Thiền (the Sino-Xenic pronunciation of Chan / Zen). Traditionally traced back to Vinitaruci (flourit 580) and his Vinitaruci sect, Thiền became one of the most influential Buddhist groups in Vietnam by the 10th century, particularly under the patriarch Vạn Hạnh (died 1018). Other early Vietnamese Zen schools included the Vô Ngôn Thông, which was associated with the teaching of Mazu Daoyi, and the Thảo Đường, which incorporated nianfo chanting techniques; both were founded by Chinese monks. Some scholars argue that the importance and prevalence of Thiền in Vietnam has been greatly overstated and that it has played more of an elite rhetorical role than a role of practice. The Thiền uyển tập anh (chữ Hán: 禪苑集英, Collection of Outstanding Figures of the Zen Garden) has been the dominant text used to legitimize Thiền lineages and history within Vietnam. However, Cường Tử Nguyễn's Zen in Medieval Vietnam: A Study and Translation of the Thiền Tập Anh (1997) gives a critical review of how the text has been used to create a history of Zen Buddhism that is "fraught with discontinuity". Vietnam is seeing a steady growth in Zen meditation today. Two figures who have been responsible for this increased interest in Thiền are Thích Nhất Hạnh, and Thích Thanh Từ, who lives in Da Lat.

==== Mahāyāna traditions ====
There are numerous contemporary Vietnamese Buddhist lineages, sects and traditions. Their features may reflect regional differences as well as historical lineage and the emphasis of specific teachers and abbots. Some of the most widespread traditions include:

- The Trúc Lâm "Bamboo Grove" school, a native tradition founded by Emperor Trần Nhân Tông (1258–1308) which is syncretic of Pure Land and Thiền with influences from other traditions as well. In the modern era, Thích Thanh Từ was a key figure in the modern revival of Trúc Lâm.
- The Vietnamese Linji school (Lâm Tế) founded in the 17th century by a group of Chinese monks led by the Chinese monk Yuánwén Zhuōzhuō (1590–1644) and his disciple Minh Hành Tại Tại (1596–1659). Nguyên Thiều (1648-1728) was instrumental in the further development of the school. In central Vietnam, Linji was transmitted by Chinese monks invited by the Nguyễn lords, including Nguyên Thiều Siêu Bạch, Minh Hoằng Tử Dung, Minh Hải Pháp Bảo, and Minh Lượng Thành Đẳng (1626–1709).
- The Liễu Quán school is a native offshoot of Lâm Tế, founded in the 18th century. It has since become one of the predominant branches of Vietnamese Zen.
- The Vietnamese Pure Land Buddhism Association (Tịnh Độ Cư Sĩ Phật Hội Việt Nam), founded by Venerable Patriarch Minh Trí in 1936. It received official recognition as an independent and legal religious organization in 2007, with 1.5 million followers.
- Plum Village Tradition, a modernist tradition founded by Thích Nhất Hạnh, which has monasteries and centers in the Western world.

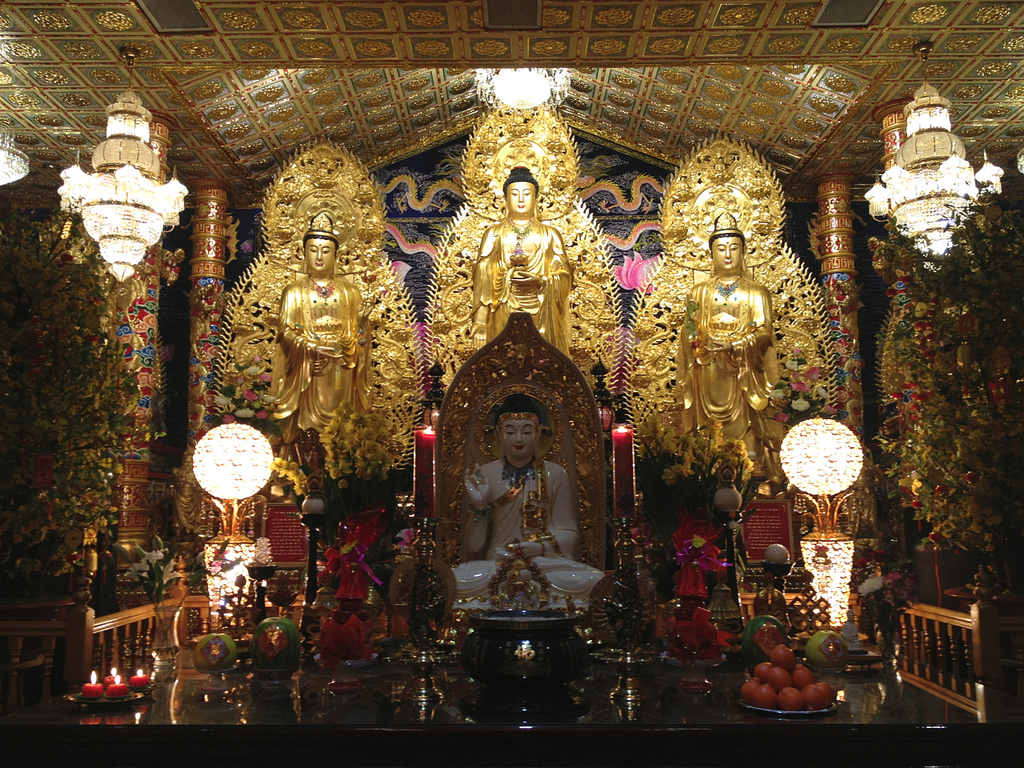
This is the main altar of a Vietnamese Buddhist temple near Seattle. In the front is a statue of Shakyamuni Buddha, the historical founder, while in the back is the "trinity" of Amitabha Buddha. On one side of Amitabha is Avalokitesvara Bodhisattva while on the other is Mahasthamaprapta Bodhisattva.

=== Theravāda Buddhism ===
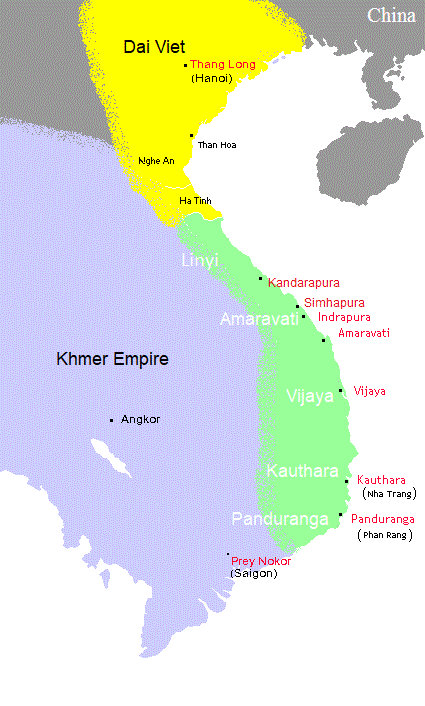
South East Asia circa 1010 CE, Đại Việt (Vietnamese) lands in yellow

The central and southern part of present-day Vietnam were originally inhabited by the Chams and the Khmer people, respectively, who followed both a syncretic Śaiva-Mahayana (see History of Buddhism in Cambodia). Theravāda spread from Sri Lanka to Cambodia during the 15th and 16th centuries, became established as the state religion in Cambodia and also spread to Cambodians living in the Mekong Delta, replaced Mahāyāna. Đại Việt annexed the land occupied by the Cham during conquests in the 15th century and by the 18th century had also annexed the southern portion of the Khmer Empire, resulting in the current borders of Vietnam. From that time onward, the dominant Đại Việt (Vietnamese) followed the Mahāyāna tradition while the Khmer people continued to practice Theravāda Buddhism.

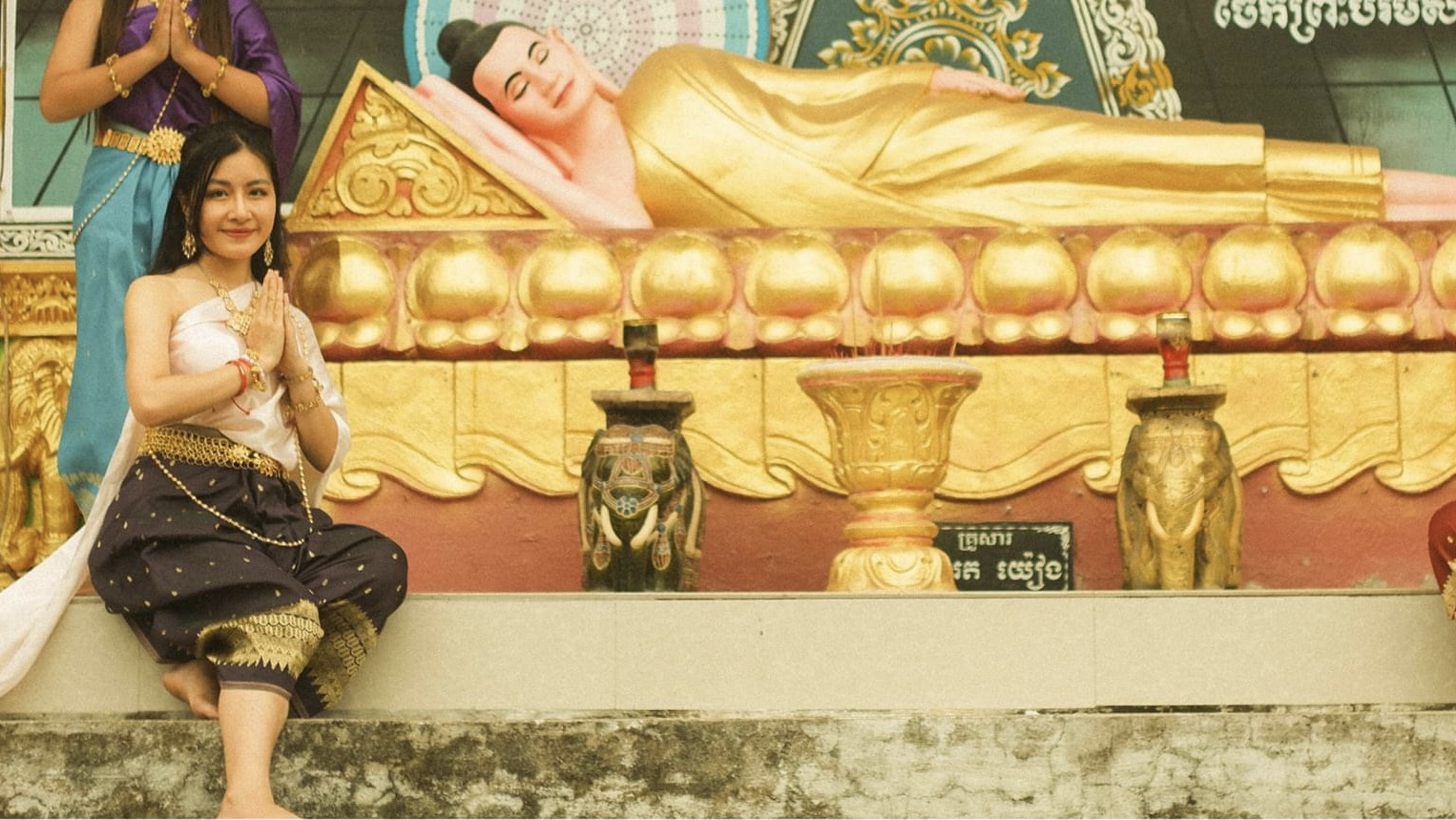
Khmer Nam Bộ girl in a traditional costume at Theravāda temple in Trà Vinh province

In the 1920s and 1930s, there were a number of movements in Vietnam for the revival and modernization of Buddhist activities. Together with the re-organization of Mahāyāna establishments, there developed a growing interest in Theravadin meditation as well as the Pāli Canon. These were then available in French. Among the pioneers who brought Theravāda Buddhism to the ethnic Đại Việt was a young veterinary doctor named Lê Văn Giảng. He was born in the Southern region, received higher education in Hanoi, and after graduation, was sent to Phnom Penh, Cambodia, to work for the French government.

During that time, he became especially interested in Theravāda Buddhist practice. Subsequently, he decided to ordain and took the Dhamma name of Hộ-Tông (Vansarakkhita). In 1940, upon an invitation from a group of lay Buddhists led by Nguyễn Văn Hiểu, he went back to Vietnam in order to help establish the first Theravadin temple for Vietnamese Buddhists at Gò Dưa, Thủ Đức (now a district of Hồ Chí Minh City). The temple was named Bửu Quang (Ratana Ramsyarama). The temple was destroyed by French troops in 1947, and was later rebuilt in 1951. At Bửu Quang temple, together with a group of Vietnamese bhikkhus who had received training in Cambodia such as Thiện Luật, Bửu Chơn, Kim Quang and Giới Nghiêm, Hộ Tông began teaching Buddhism in their native Vietnamese. He also translated many Buddhist materials from the Pali Canon, and Theravāda Buddhism became part of Vietnamese Buddhist activity in the country.

In 1949–1950, Hộ Tông together with Nguyễn Văn Hiểu and supporters built a new temple in Saigon (now Hồ Chí Minh City), named Kỳ Viên Tự (Jetavana Vihara). This temple became the centre of Theravadin Buddhist activities in Vietnam, which continued to attract increasing interest among the Vietnamese Buddhists. In 1957, the Vietnamese Theravāda Buddhist Sangha Congregation (Giáo hội Tăng-già Nguyên thủy Việt Nam) was formally established and recognised by the government, and the Theravāda Sangha elected Venerable Hộ Tông as its first President, or Sangharaja.

From Saigon, the Theravādin Buddhist movement spread to other provinces, and soon, a number of Theravādin temples for ethnic Viet Buddhists were established in many areas in the Southern and Central parts of Vietnam. There are 529 Theravādin Buddhist temples throughout the country, of which 19 were located in Hồ Chí Minh City and its vicinity. Besides Bửu Quang and Kỳ Viên temples, other well known temples are Bửu Long, Giác Quang, Tam Bảo (Đà Nẵng), Thiền Lâm and Huyền Không (Huế), and the large Thích Ca Phật Đài in Vũng Tàu.

There is also a branch of Theravāda Buddhism that also combines elements from the Mahāyāna tradition which is called Vietnam Mendicant Sangha or in Vietnamese, Đạo Phật Khất Sĩ Việt Nam, it was created by Thích Minh Đăng Quang, who wanted to create the original Buddhist tradition by walking barefoot and begging for alms.

== Organizations ==
At the moment, the Buddhist Sangha of Vietnam is the official Buddhist organization of the whole Vietnam. It was established on 7/11/1981, sponsored and recognized by the Government of Vietnam. The headquarter is in Hanoi. The current Supreme Patriarch is The Most Venerable Thích Trí Quảng.

Another un-recognized Buddhist organization is the Unified Buddhist Church of Vietnam which has existed in the former South Vietnam during Vietnam War. However many of its followers have joined the newly established Buddhist Sangha of Vietnam, some followers resent the socialist government and oppose the new sangha. Hence the Unified Buddhist Church still exists today in Vietnam (but very scattered and outlawed) and exile in overseas.

Other smaller independent Buddhist sects exist in Vietnam, such as:

- Đạo Bửu Sơn Kỳ Hương
- Hòa Hảo: under the Hòa Hảo Buddhist Sangha
- Minh Sư Đạo: influenced by Theravāda Buddhism, Confucianism and Taoism; under the Theravāda Buddhist Sangha of Minh Sư ̣Đạo
- Minh Lý Đạo: influenced by Buddhism, Confucianism and Taoism
- Tịnh Đo Cư Sĩ Phật Hội (Tịnh Độ Cư Sĩ Buddhism): under the Buddhist Sangha of Tịnh Độ Cư Sĩ
- Tứ Ân Hiếu Nghĩa Buddhism: under the Tứ Ân Hiếu Nghĩa Buddhist Association

All of those Buddhist sects are recognized by the current Government of Vietnam.

== Gallery ==
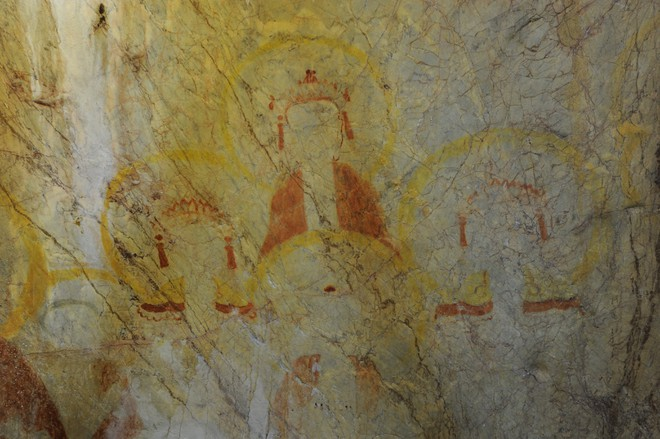
Bodhisattva on Lotus fresco figures, 10th - 13th century in Thien Ke Temple, Tuyen Quang

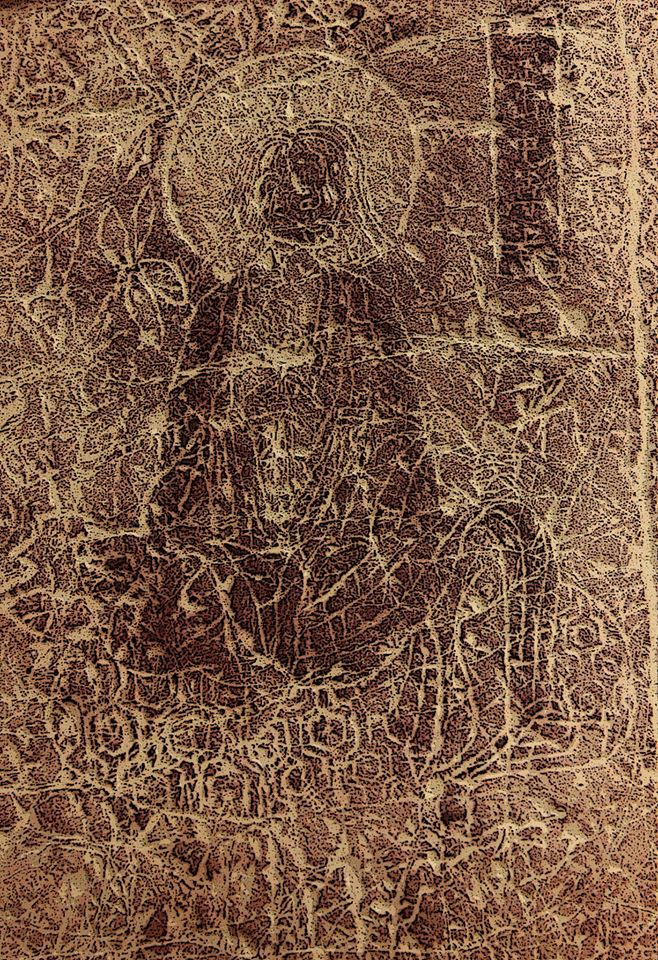
Buddhist Arhat mural in Liên Hoa cave, Ninh Bình province, dated 10-11th century

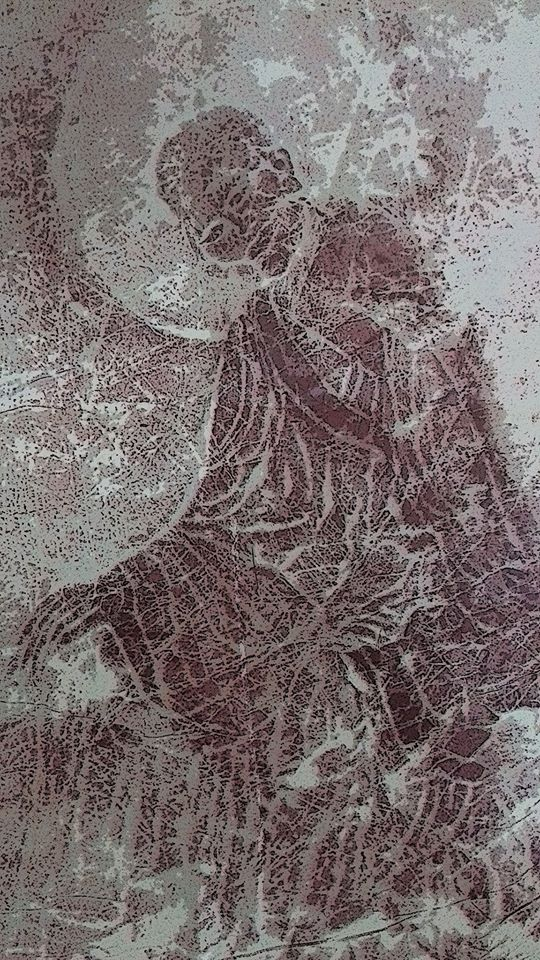
Buddhist Arhat mural in Liên Hoa cave, Ninh Bình province, dated 10-11th century

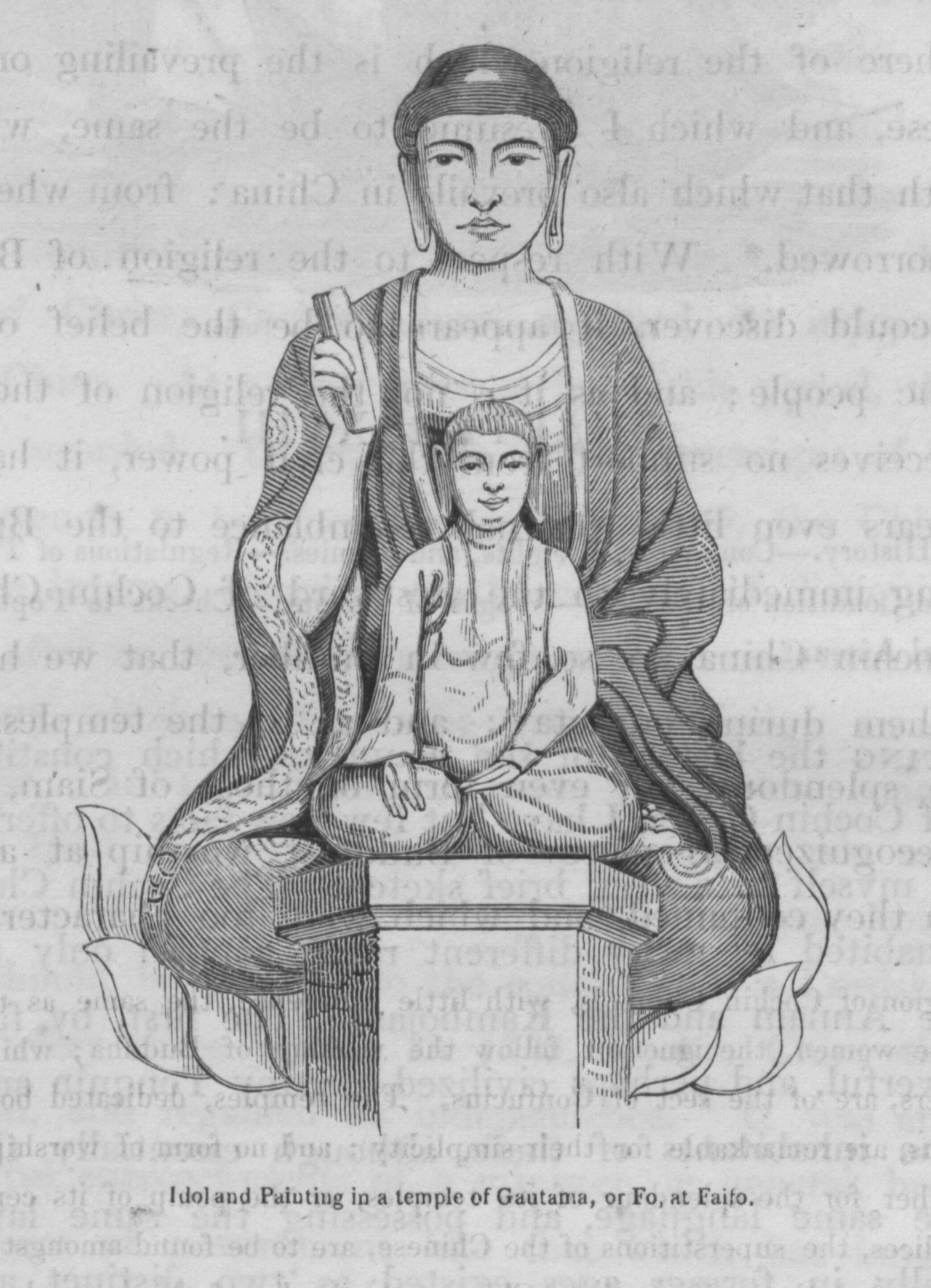
Idol and Painting in a temple of Gautama or Fo at Faifo by John Crawfurd book Published by H Colburn London 1828

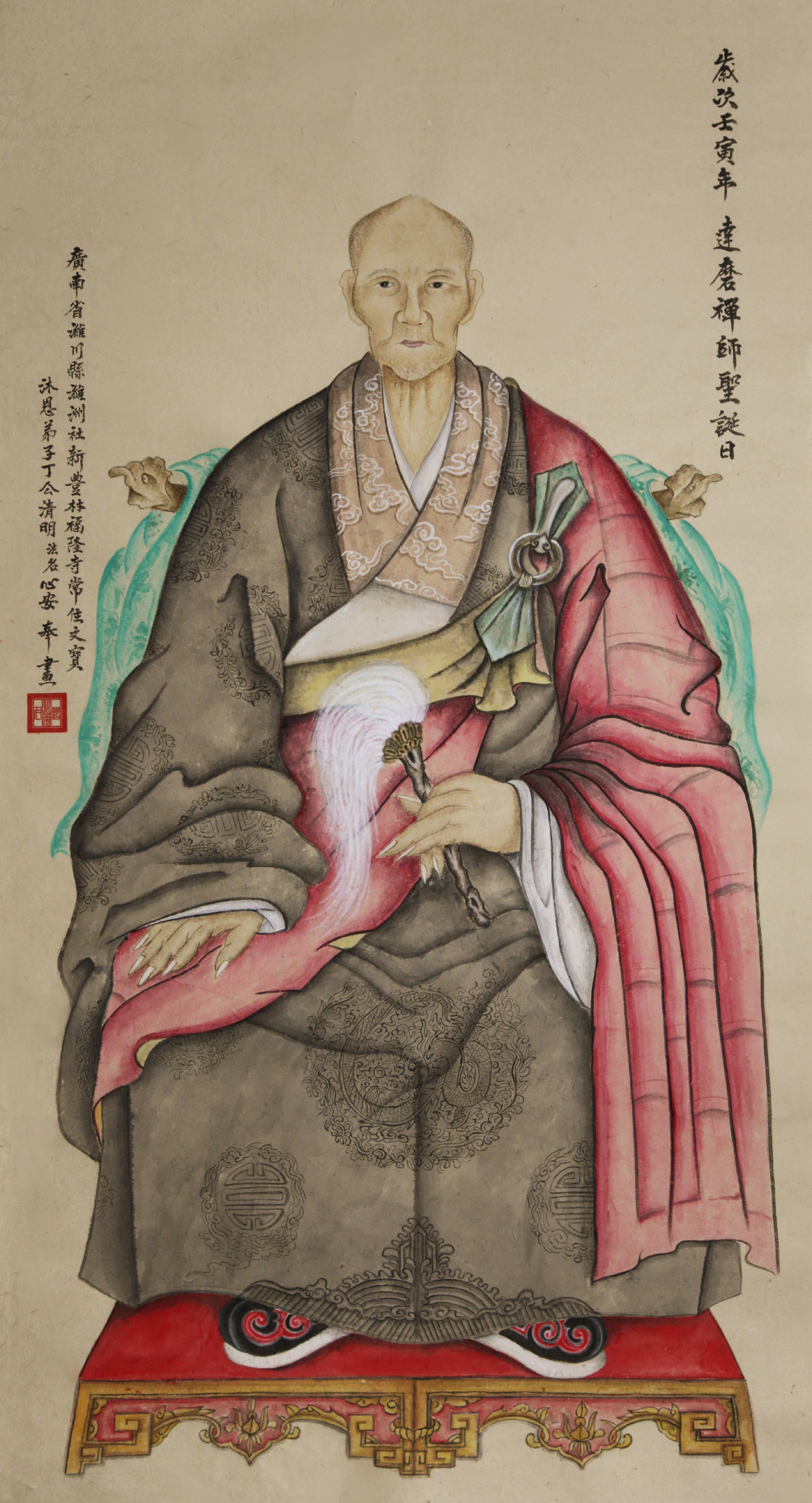
Zen master Minh Hải

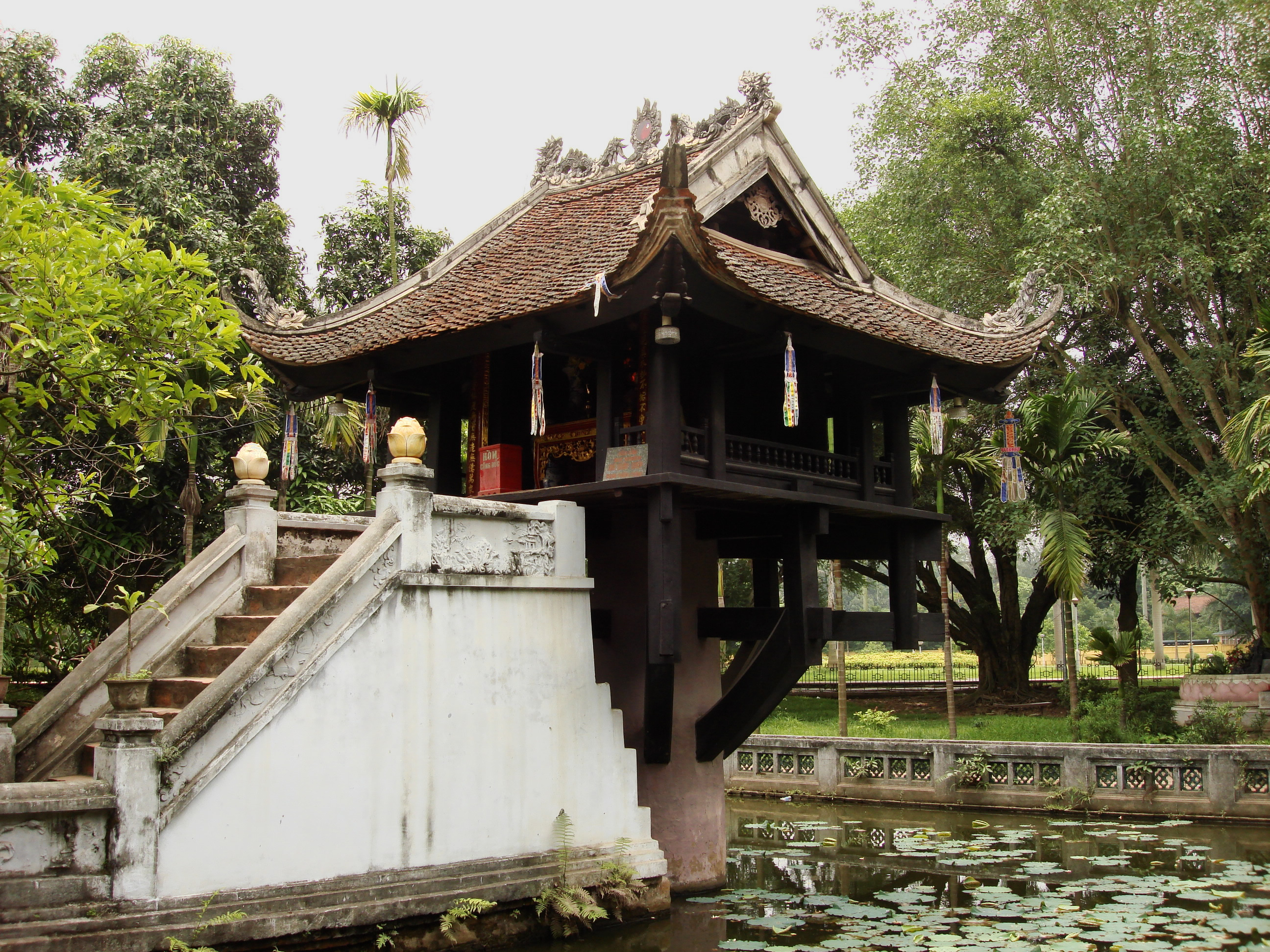
The One Pillar Pagoda is a historic Mahāyāna Buddhist temple in Hanoi, the capital of Vietnam.

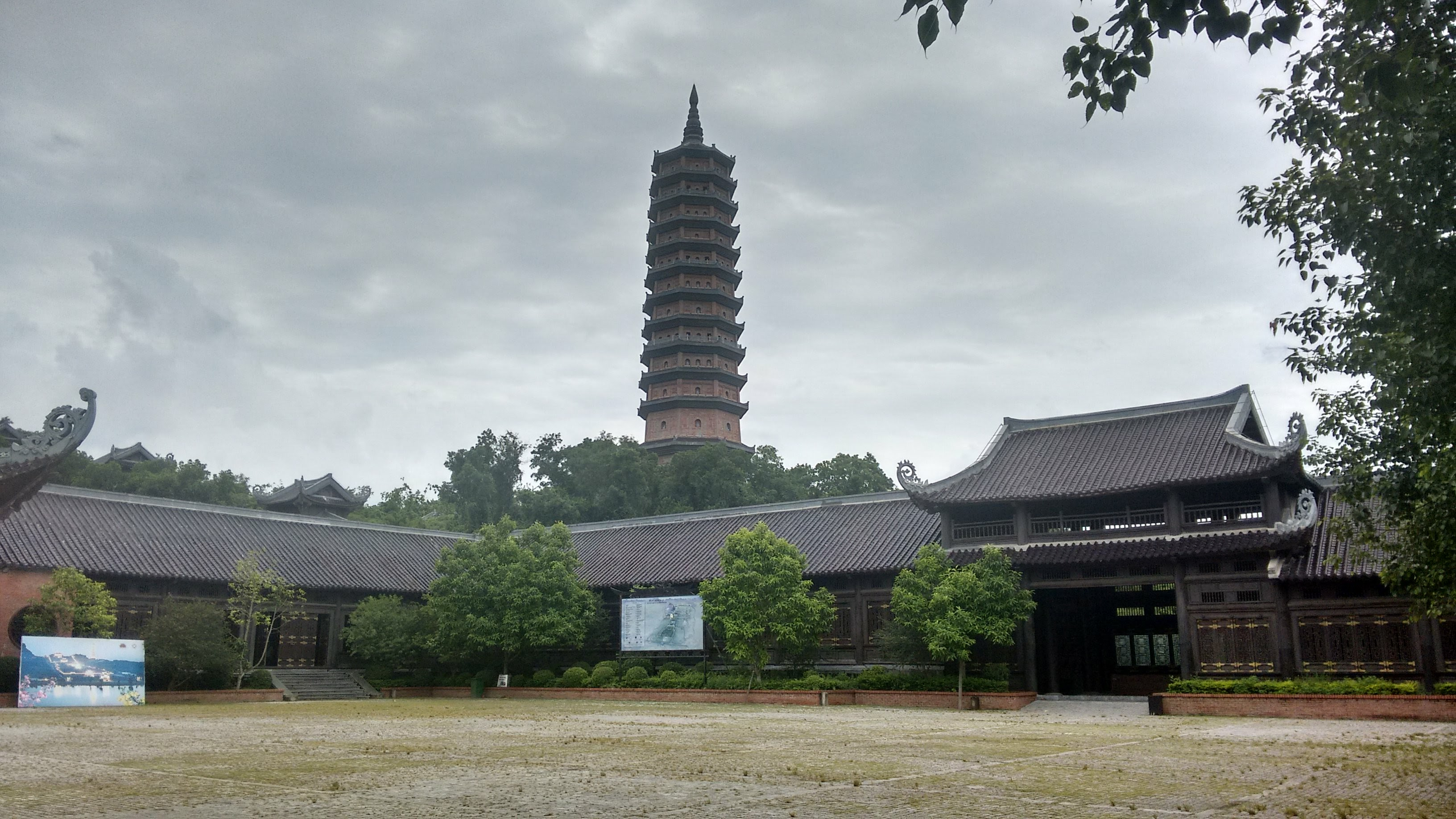
Bái Đính Temple is a complex of Mahayana Buddhist temples on Bai Dinh Mountain.

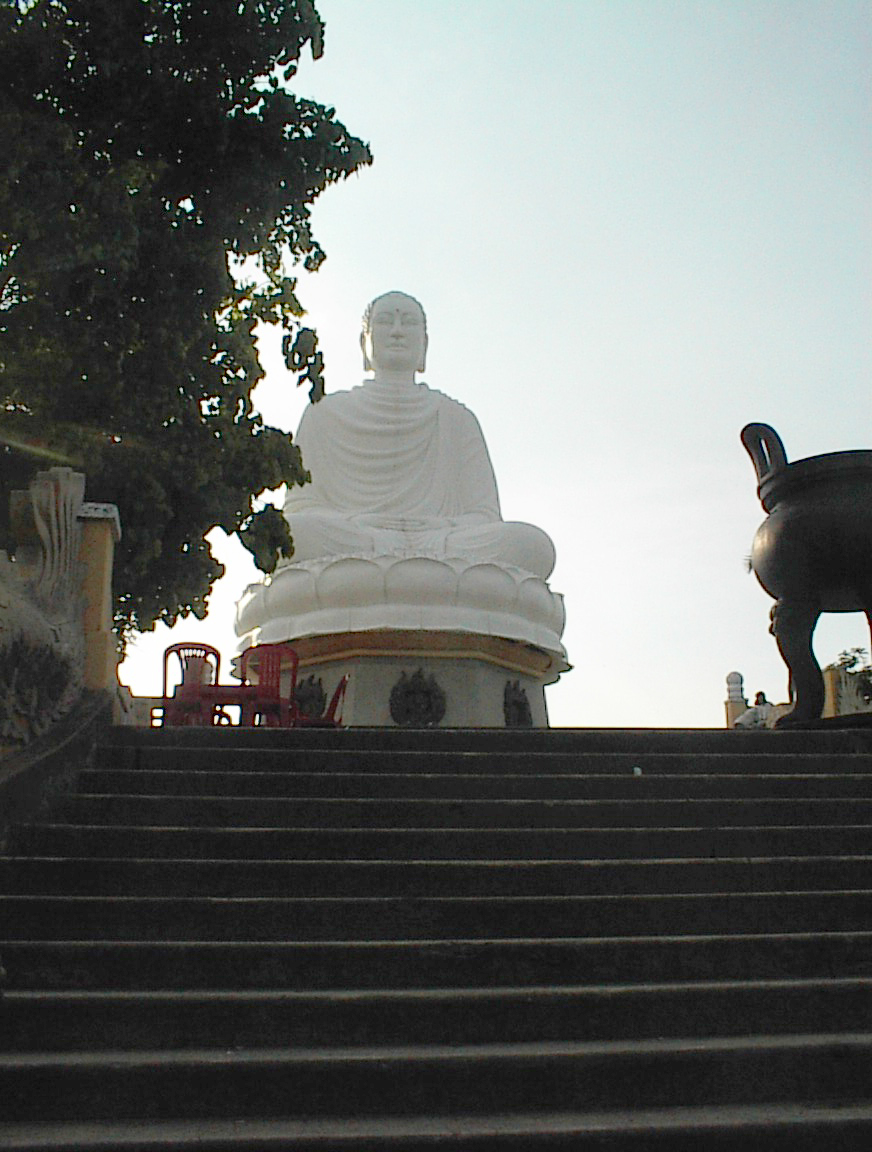
Hải Đức Buddha, the 30 ft tall statue built in 1964 at Long Sơn Temple in Nha Trang.

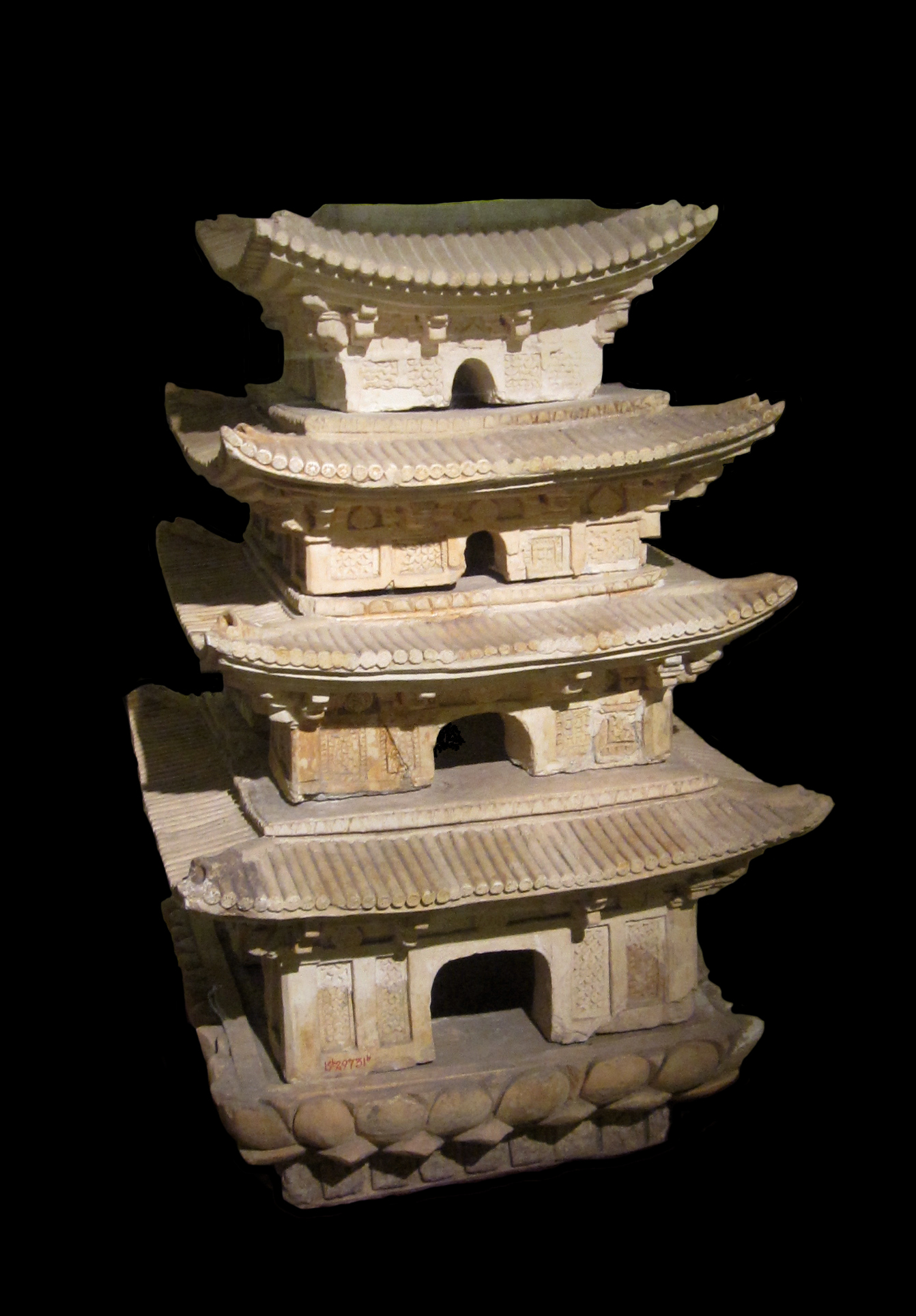
Ceramic pagoda with lotus, bodhi leaf, dancer decoration, Hanoi (Lý dynasty, 11th-13th century).

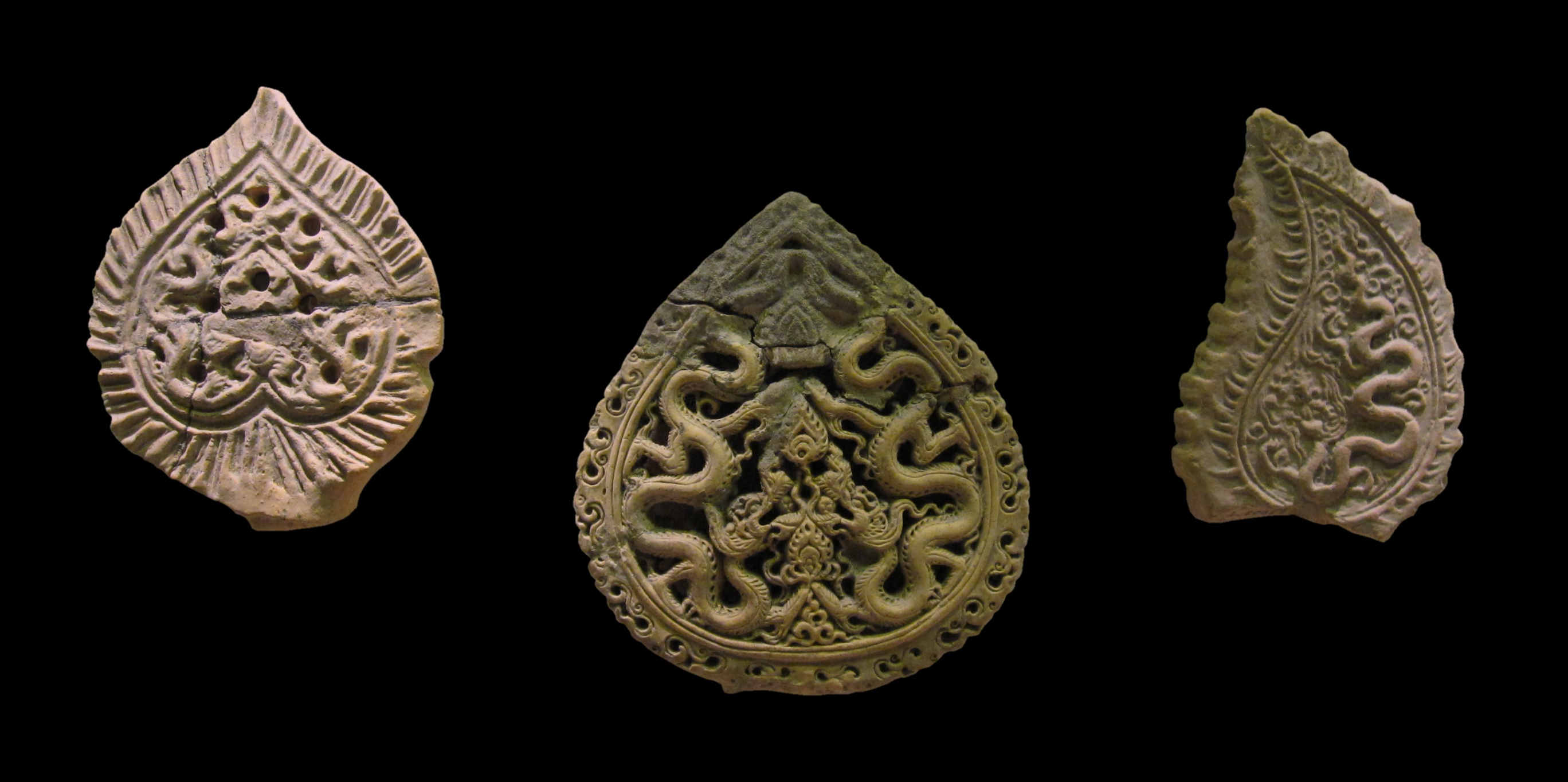
Terracotta Bodhi leaves with dragon motif (Lý-Trần dynasties, 11th-14th century).

== See also ==
- Trúc Lâm
- Vietnamese Thiền
- Vô Ngôn Thông
- Thiền uyển tập anh
- Thích Ca Phật Đài
- Mahapanya Vidayalai
- Buddhist Sangha of Vietnam
- Vietnamese Buddhist Youth Association
- Unified Buddhist Sangha of Vietnam
- Buddhist temples in Huế
- Buddhist crisis
- Religion in Vietnam
