= Lê Quát =

Lê Quát (黎括) was a 14th-century Vietnamese Confucian mandarin of the Trần dynasty. He is best known for his proposal in 1370 to have Buddhism in Vietnam, the favoured religion of the Trần dynasty, deemed as heretical. This was the first such attempt, and it failed, although Confucianism came to be the ruling doctrine under the subsequent Lê dynasty.
