= Thích Ca Phật Đài =

Buddhist temple in Vietnam

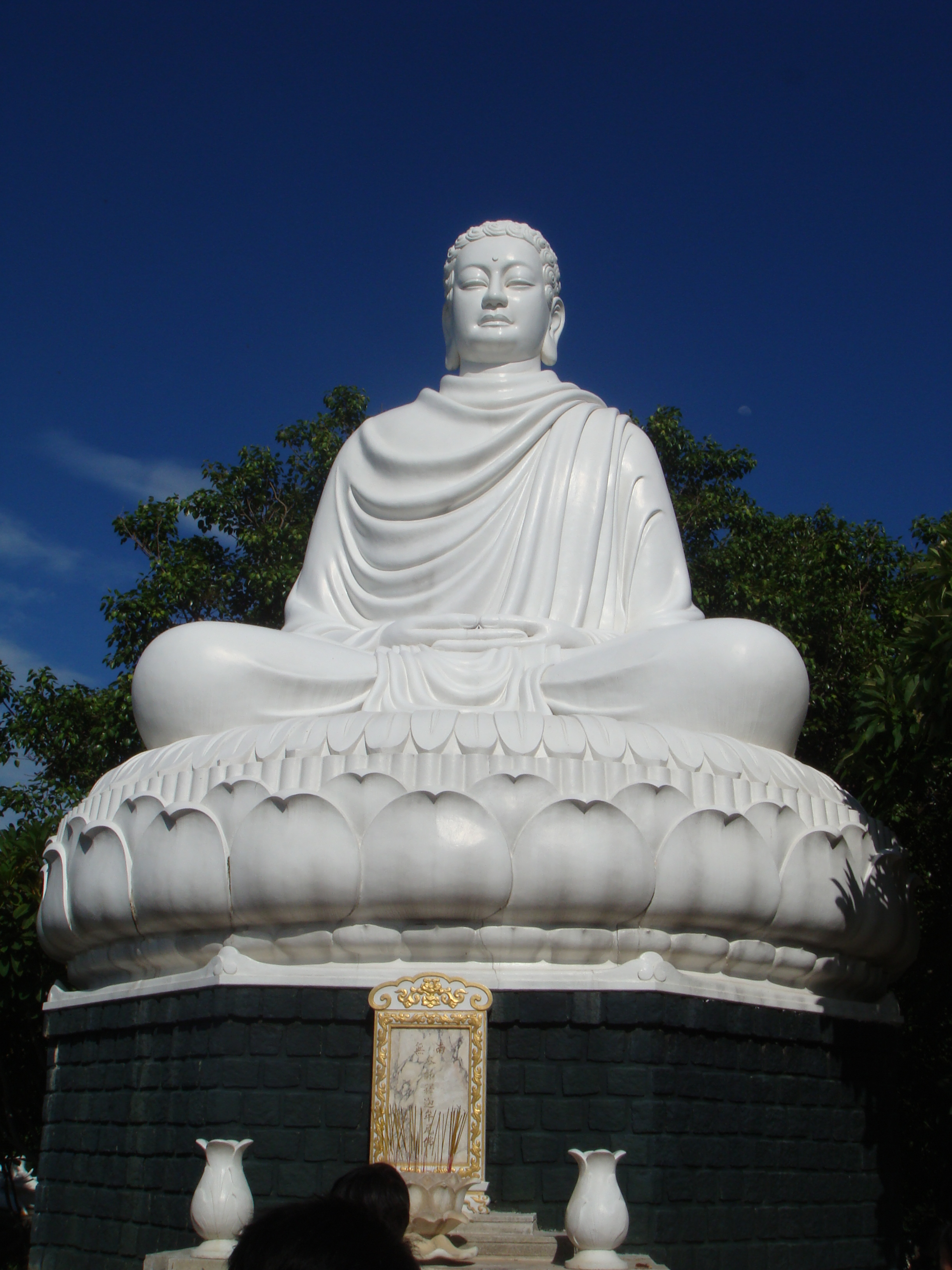
The main statue of Gautama Buddha in Thích Ca Phật Đài Buddhist temple.

Thích Ca Phật Đài (lit. 'Platform of Shakyamuni Buddha') is a notable Theravada Buddhist temple in the coastal city of Vung Tau in southern Vietnam. It lies to the northwest of the Lớn mountain and was built between 1961 and 1963 when it was opened.

It is set on a plot of around five hectares, with a Zen Buddhist monastery at the foot of the plot and the Thích Ca Phật Đài at the top. The Zen monastery is a small brick temple built by a government official from Vung Tau in 1957. In 1961, the Buddhist association organised for a renovation of the monastery and decided to build the Thích Ca Phật Đài further up the mountain. Additional lodgings were built to cater to Buddhist pilgrims who come and visit the site.

The temple is reached by taking a left turn from the Bến Đình markets and travelling one kilometre to the foot of the Lớn mountain. This leads to the front of the temple, which is marked by a triple gate held up by four imposing and solid pillars. Past the triple gate, there is a long path of stone steps leading up the hill to the temple. The path overlooks the city down to the South China Sea below. The grounds are dense with foliage, resembling a jungle and heavily populated by birds.

Along the path up to the temple, the way is decorated with various statues that depict important events in the life of Gautama Buddha: his birth as Prince Siddhartha, his renunciation of the world, the enlightenment under the bodhi tree at Bodh Gaya, the first sermon at Sarnath and the passing into final Nibbāna at Kusinara. There is also a garden, with plants and flowers blooming all year round, with props and scenery to re-enact the first sermon at Deer Park in Sarnath, where the Buddha explained the Four Noble Truths and the Noble Eightfold Path to the first five sangha and arahants: Kaundinya, Assaji, Mahanama, Bhaddiya and Vappa.

Further along the path to the temple at the top of the hill, there is a bodhi tree that was brought to Vietnam on November 2, 1960, by the Venerable Narada, an eminent Theravada Buddhist monk from Sri Lanka known for his efforts in spreading the Dhamma. There are an additional six circularly wrapped dragon statues along the path. Behind the dragons are two lions, which represent strength and force. There is a stone paved yard at the top, with an octagonal stupa standing 19 m surrounded by four peaks in each direction. Each of these sites contain soil taken from the four holiest sites of Buddhism in ancient India: Lumbini, the birthplace of Prince Siddhartha, Bodh Gaya, the location of enlightenment, Sarnath, the location of the first sermon and the forest Kusinara where the Buddha entered nirvana.

The main statue of Gautama Buddha sitting on a lotus seat stands 10.20 m. The white colour of the statue and the stupa contrast against the blue and green background of the surrounding sky and forest. The site has become a major tourist location in the city as well as a tourist lookout.
