= Vietnamese Buddhist Youth Association =

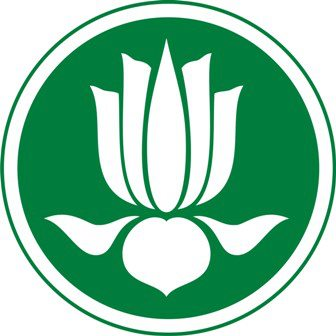
- Founded: April 1951
- Founder: Lê Đình Thám
- Location: Worldwide
- Origins: Vietnam
- Region served: International
- Website: www.gdptvietnam.org (Vietnamese, Unified Buddhist Church of Vietnam's) www.giadinhphattu.net (Vietnamese, Vietnam Buddhist Sangha's)
- Motto: Bi - Trí - Dũng (Vietnamese: Compassion - Wisdom - Courage)

The Vietnamese Buddhist Youth Association (also known as Vietnamese Buddhist Family (Vietnamese: Gia Đình Phật Tử Việt Nam (GĐPTVN)) is a lay Buddhist youth organization that seeks to imbue its members with Buddhist ethics. The organization was originally established in the 1940s, took its present name and form in 1951 and has been in existence for about 80 years in Vietnam and in Overseas Vietnamese communities since the Fall of Saigon.
