= Cửu Long province =

Historic province of Vietnam

Cửu Long
- Province
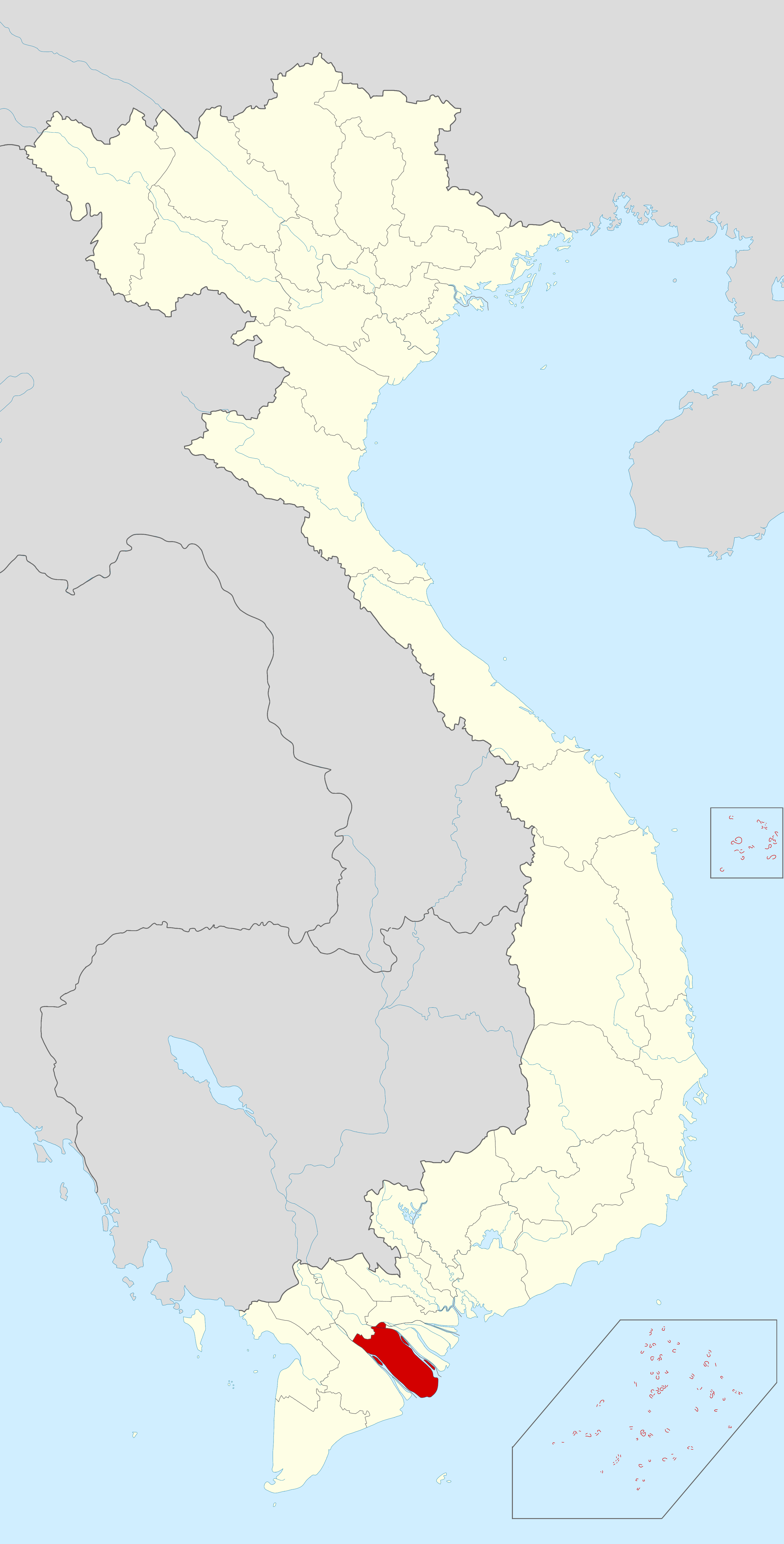
- Location of Cửu Long province on the 1976 map of Vietnam (highlighted in red)
- Country: Vietnam
- Region: Mekong Delta
- Province founding: February 24, 1976
- Dissolution: December 26, 1991

Area
  - Total: 3,856 km^{2} (1,489 sq mi)

Population (1992)
  - Total: 1,979,800 people
  - Density: 513.4/km^{2} (1,330/sq mi)

Cửu Long was a province in the Mekong Delta region of southern Vietnam. It was created in 1976 from the merger of Vĩnh Long province and Trà Vinh province, and in 1992 Cửu Long was re-split into Vĩnh Long and Trà Vinh provinces. The entire province is now part of the new Vĩnh Long province.

== History ==
On February 24, 1976, the Provisional Revolutionary Government of the Republic of South Vietnam issued Decree No. 3/NQ/1976 regarding the merger of Vĩnh Long province and Trà Vinh province into a single province named Vĩnh Trà province.

At that time, Vĩnh Trà province had 2 district-level towns: Vĩnh Long (capital province) and Trà Vinh, and 12 districts: Bình Minh, Cái Nhum, Càng Long, Cầu Kè, Cầu Ngang, Châu Thành Đông (East Châu Thành), Châu Thành Tây (West Châu Thành), Tam Bình, Tiểu Cần, Trà Cú, Trà Ôn, Vũng Liêm.

July 27, 1976, The National Assembly of Vietnam issued a Resolution on renaming Vĩnh Trà province to Cửu Long province.

At that time, Cửu Long province had 2 district-level towns: Vĩnh Long (capital province) and Trà Vinh, and 12 districts: Bình Minh, Cái Nhum, Càng Long, Cầu Kè, Cầu Ngang, Châu Thành Đông (East Châu Thành), Châu Thành Tây (West Châu Thành), Tam Bình, Tiểu Cần, Trà Cú, Trà Ôn, Vũng Liêm.

On March 11, 1977, the Chairman of the Council of Ministers issued Decision No. 59-CP concerning:

- Long Hồ district was established based on the entire Châu Thành Tây district (except for 2 communes: Tân Ngãi and Tân Hòa), Cái Nhum district and 2 communes: Hậu Lộc, Hoà Hiệp belongs to Tam Bình district.
- Merging Bình Minh district into Tam Bình district.
- Merging Trà Ôn district (excluding Hòa Bình, Xuân Hiệp, and Thới Hòa communes) and the two communes of Long Thới and Tiểu Cần in Tiểu Cần district into Cầu Kè district.
- Merging Hiếu Tử commune of Tiểu Cần district with 5 communes: Nguyệt Hoá, Lương Hoá, Đa Lộc, Thanh Mỹ, Song Lộc of Châu Thành Tây district into Càng Long district.
- The 3 communes of Hòa Bình, Xuân Hiệp, and Thới Hòa in Trà Ôn district, was merged into Vũng Liêm district.
- The 4 communes of the district were merged: Hòa Thuận, Lương Hoà, Hưng Mỹ, and Phước Hào from Châu Thành Đông district to Cầu Ngang district.
- The 3 communes of Tập Ngãi, Hùng Hòa, and Tân Hòa of Tiểu Cần district into Trà Cú district.
- Merging Long Đức commune in Châu Thành Đông district into Trà Vinh district-level town.
- Merging two communes: Tân Ngãi and Tân Hòa in Châu Thành Tây district into Vĩnh Long district-level town.

At that time, Cuu Long province had 2 district-level towns: Vĩnh Long (capital province) and Trà Vinh and 7 districts: Cầu Kè, Cầu Ngang, Càng Long, Long Hồ, Tam Bình, Trà Cú, Vũng Liêm.

== Etymology ==
In Vietnamese, Cửu Long (deriving from the Sino-Vietnamese 九龍) literally means "nine dragons," referring to the Mekong, known in Vietnamese as the "River of Nine Dragons".
