= Phong Thạnh =

Phong Thạnh may refer to several places in Vietnam, including:

- Phong Thạnh, Bạc Liêu, a rural commune of Giá Rai
- Phong Thạnh, Trà Vinh, a rural commune of Cầu Kè District
