= Tam Bình =

Tam Bình may refer to several places in Vietnam:

- Tam Bình, Ho Chi Minh City: a ward in the former Thủ Đức city (previously Thủ Đức district)
- Tam Bình, Vĩnh Long: a commune in the former Tam Bình district, previously a township and district capital
- Tam Bình district: a former district, dissolved in 2025 as part of the 2025 Vietnamese administrative reform
