= Taqua banana =

Banana cultivar

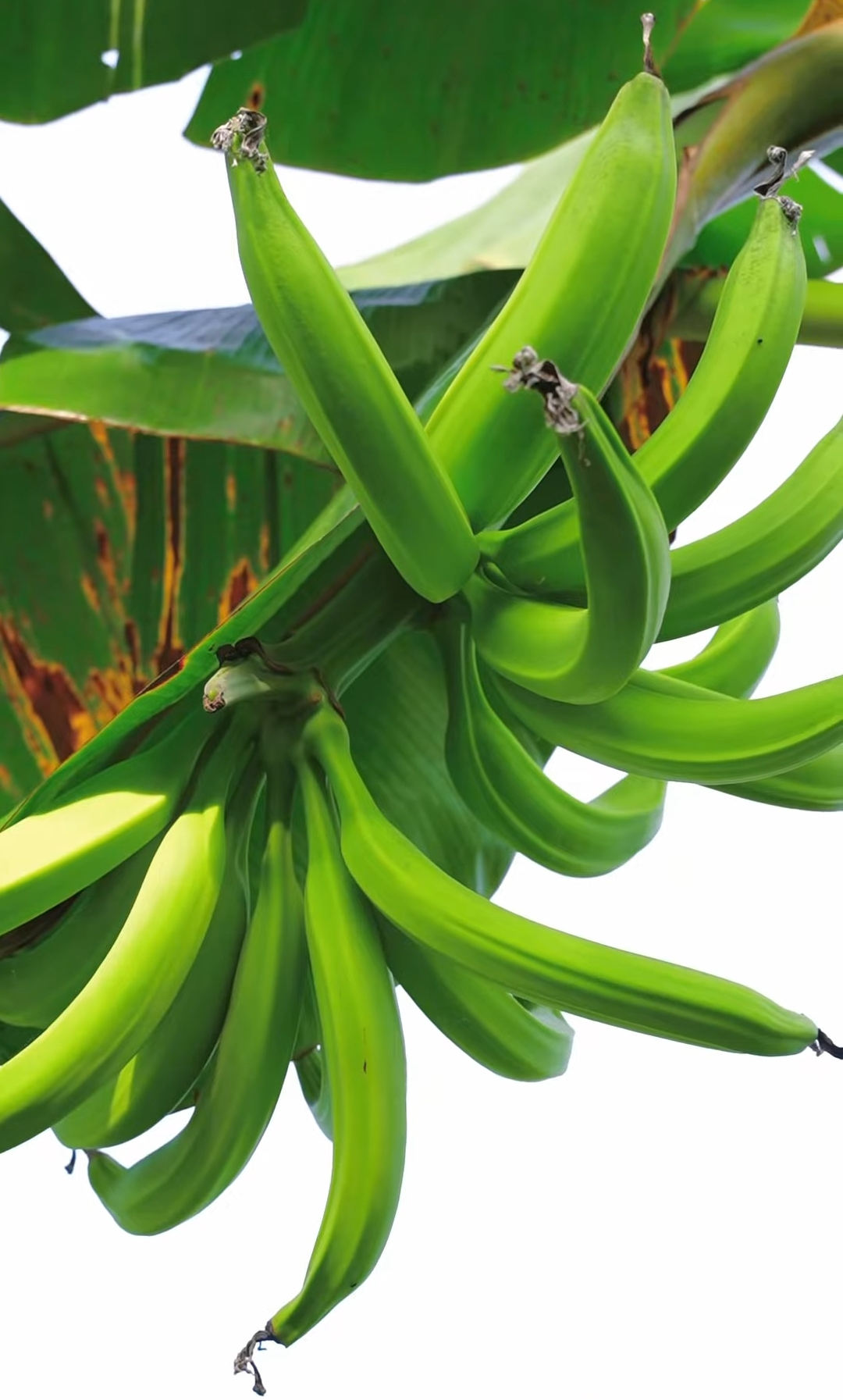
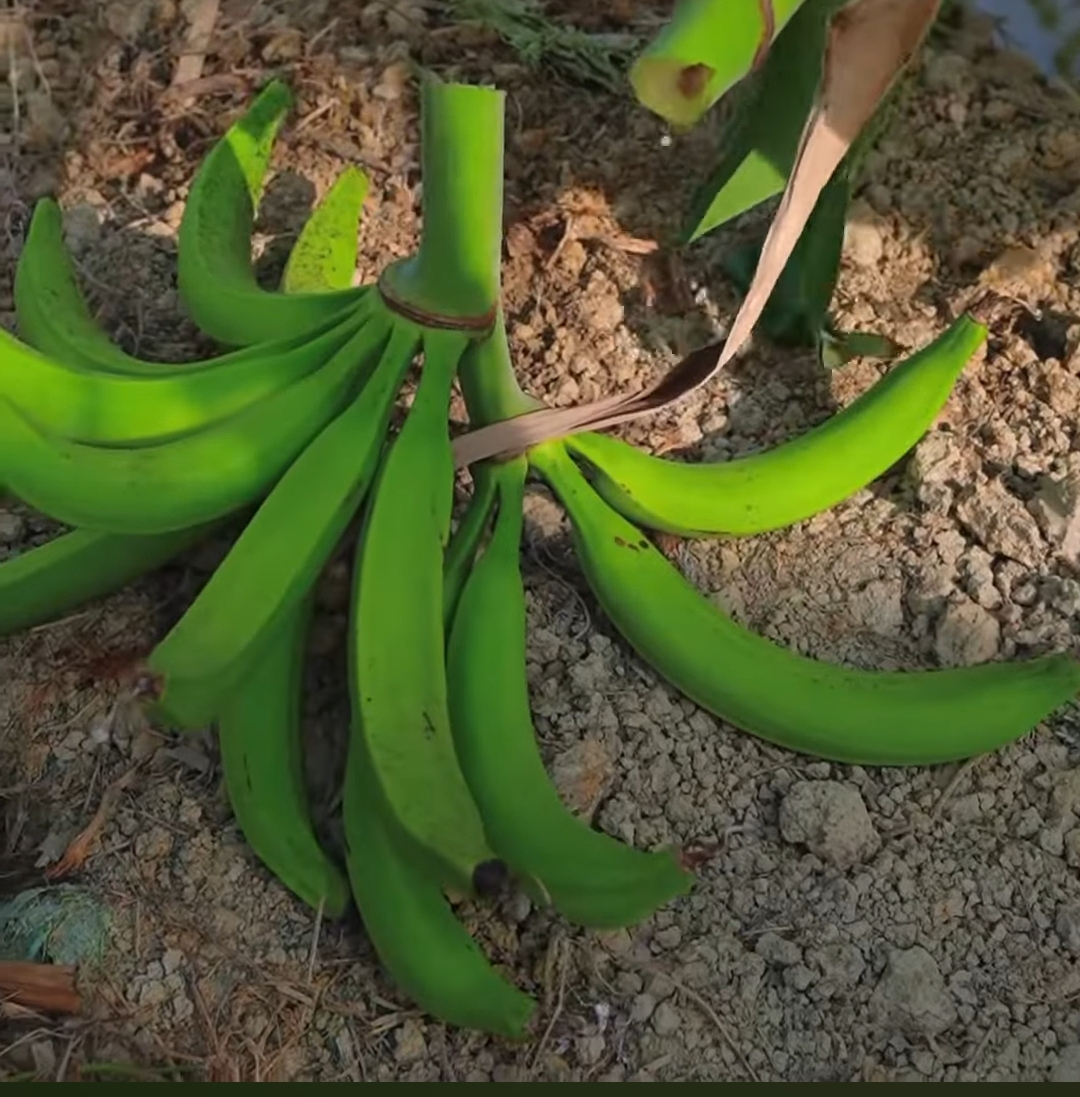
- Bunch of taqua bananas on the tree Bunch of taqua bananas after being cut from the tree
- Genus: Musa
- Species: Musa × paradisiaca
- Cultivar group: Cooking banana
- Cultivar: Taqua banana
- Marketing names: chuối tá quạ in Vietnamese language
- Origin: Cầu Kè district, Trà Vinh province

Taqua banana ("chuối tá quạ" in Vietnamese language) is a cultivated cooking banana cultivar, originating from Vietnam. This is a speciality fruit in Trà Vinh province. This cooking banana cultivar has many different characteristics, such as size and weight of the fruit, which are much larger than other banana cultivars. According to the belief of formerly Tra Vinh people, planting taqua banana would bring bad luck. Taqua banana produce few fruits, so in the past, Tra Vinh people only planted a few trees in the garden to get edible fruits or worship, but rarely planted it for trade. However, today, this fruit has become famous, breeding, cultivated and commonly sold on the market.

== History and common name ==
Taqua banana is originated from Cầu Kè district, Trà Vinh province. According to formerly beliefs, Cau Ke people spread word of mouth that planting this banana cultivar would bring bad luck. Especially at night, when the banana tree blooms and twists its body, it would make a very scary noise. The next morning, the bunch of young bananas had finished blooming. When people woke up and discovered this scene, they were "tá hỏa" (meaning panicky), meaning a state of panic and shock. According to the hypothesis, the name "taqua banana" ("chuối tá quạ" in Vietnamese language) was given according to the euphemistic pronunciation of the word "tá hỏa" due to the above conception or possibly because this banana fruit is so large that it makes people startled.

== Description ==
Taqua banana has a shape that is almost no different from a regular banana tree. The tree-trunk is small and weak, easily broken, so when the banana blooms, they must be used as a support. It is grown for about 8–9 months before bearing fruit. A bunch of taqua bananas usually grows about 2-3 hands, yielding about more than ten banana fruits. This banana cultivar has a special feature: the tree only bears fruit directly, not buds like regular bananas.

Taqua bananas are famous due to this fruit looks much larger than the fruit of regular bananas, as large as a human wrist. Each taqua banana fruit can grown 35 – 45 cm in long (some fruits reach 50 cm) and have average weight of about 300 - 450 g/fruit (some fruits reach more than 1 kg). The heaviest record is 1,3 kg.

Taqua banana fruits contain the same nutritional content as potatoes, rich in calories but high in vitamins (A, C and B-6) and essential minerals (magnesium and potassium). Eating taqua banana fruits is good for people at risk of stroke, osteoporosis and kidney disease. It also helps reduce constipation, diverticulitis and digestive diseases.

== Culinary uses ==
Different from regular banana varieties, taqua banana have to be processed and cooked, and are usually not eaten directly because this fruit is very mushy and has a very bland taste. Taqua banana are used as ingredients to prepare many dishes such as curry soup, hot pot, jam, cake..., but the most common cooking method is boiling. By boiling, when eaten, taqua banana would be very supple, fragrant and sweet and feel like there is honey inside. Because of their large size, when boiled, they are often tied tightly with string to prevent the skin from cracking, preventing water from seeping in and losing sweetness of banana fruits.

The traditional process of boiling taqua bananas is as follows: picking ripe taqua bananas, separating each hand to dry in the hot sun, then incubated for about two days until the banana turns yellow. Separate each fruit with a knife. Use a string to tie tightly around banana fruit (like a bánh tét) to keep the peel from cracking. When cooking, the water would not penetrate to prevent banana fruits from becoming mushy and having a bland taste. Pour boiling water to cover the fruit, then place bamboo mats or stones on top to prevent banana fruits from becoming gray with sap. Cooking for about an hour to a half, use chopsticks to gently test to feel the softness, then bring it down. Wait getting cool and then use a knife to slice it suitable because taqua banana fruits are long and large. Arrange on a plate and enjoy.

Taqua bananas are processed into banana jam rather elaborate. After harvesting, bananas has ripen naturally for about 2–3 days to facilitate peeling. The banana pulp is sliced thinly, soaked with lime juice to remove the sap. Whole thin banana slices are deep fried in cooking oil. When well-done yellow, take it out, drain off oil and sprinkle the cooked sugar-water to soak in, the jam would be sweet.

== Breeding and cultivation ==
Due to the long planting time and difficulty in blooming, taqua banana has become scarce, which are specialty fruits in Cầu Kè district, Trà Vinh province. However, they adapt well to acid sulfate soil. Planting a garden is not simple, because they rarely sprout, each mother-tree usually only grows 1-2 seedlings, so digging up each seedling to plant a garden is rather difficult. Over time, small seedlings degenerate, susceptible to disease and poor fruit-quality leads to low profits. To reduce planting time, seedling tissue culture method is currently very popular. Usually, they would produce three harvests every 2 years.

Use in vitro method for breeding. The suitable environment for taqua banana buds to regenerate is Murashige and Skoog medium supplemented with compounds including napthan acetic acid (NAA) 0,1 mg/l, adenine hemisulfate 100 mg/l, coconut juice 10% v/v, sucrose 30gr/l, agar 8gr/l, 6-benzylaminopurine (BAP) 5 mg/l, pH 5.8. Explants in complete darkness would give the highest number of regenerative buds. To achieve the optimal number of rapidly multiplying buds on taqua banana, it is necessary to use a medium with the following ingredients: Murashige and Skoog medium supplemented with growth regulators including adenine hemisulfate 100 mg/l, coconut juice 10% v/v, sucrose 30gr/l, agar 8gr/l, BAP 7 mg/l, pH 5.8. To achieve the optimal rate of rooting, number of roots, root length, stem height as well as number of leaves/tree for complete regeneration of taqua banana, it is necessary to culture them in a medium with nutritious ingredients: MS supplemented with NAA at concentration of 1 mg/l, adenine hemisulfatehemisulfate 100 mg/l, coconut juice 10% v/v, sucrose 20gr/l, agar 8gr/l, pH was adjusted at 5.8. Banana trees, that are reared in rich soil substrate, muck and coconut humus at a ratio of 2:1:2, grow best.

Tissue culture produces healthy, disease-free seedlings with roots and leaves, absorbs soil and grows quickly. Planting at the same time makes it easy to care for and harvest banana bunches. Basal fertilizing, top-dressing, and water fully. Choosing to plant monoculture or polyculture (planting in the garden with other fruit trees) is fine. If planting polyculture, gardeners need to keep the distance wide enough for banana trees as well as enough light for 6–7 hours/day for the bananas to grow. If planting monoculture, gardeners should choose good soil and water fully. Although moisture is necessary, if taqua banana is waterlogged, after only 5–6 days of submerging the roots, the leaves would fold and dead-trees. Build a bed 50–60 cm high, planting distance 3×4 m/tree, place the tree in a hole 20 cm lower than the bed surface, in two rows, water and cover with grass to keep it moist regularly to take care of the tree. Fertilize with NPK 20–20–15, 3-4 times/year according to tree trunk size and leaf color, and cultivate dusty warm soil. To keep the beautiful shape, gardeners need to wrap the banana bunch with blue nylon bag, cut off flower under banana hands, wrap a spoonful of urea fertilizer to cover the position of the stem where cutting flower, supporting banana fruits grow larger. Taqua bananas would bloom after about 8–9 months; and bunches can be harvested after 6–7 months. Currently, the cooperative in district is supporting gardeners to plant taqua banana according to VietGAP regulations to ensure quality, adapt to climate change and clearly trace the origin of the products.

== Trade ==
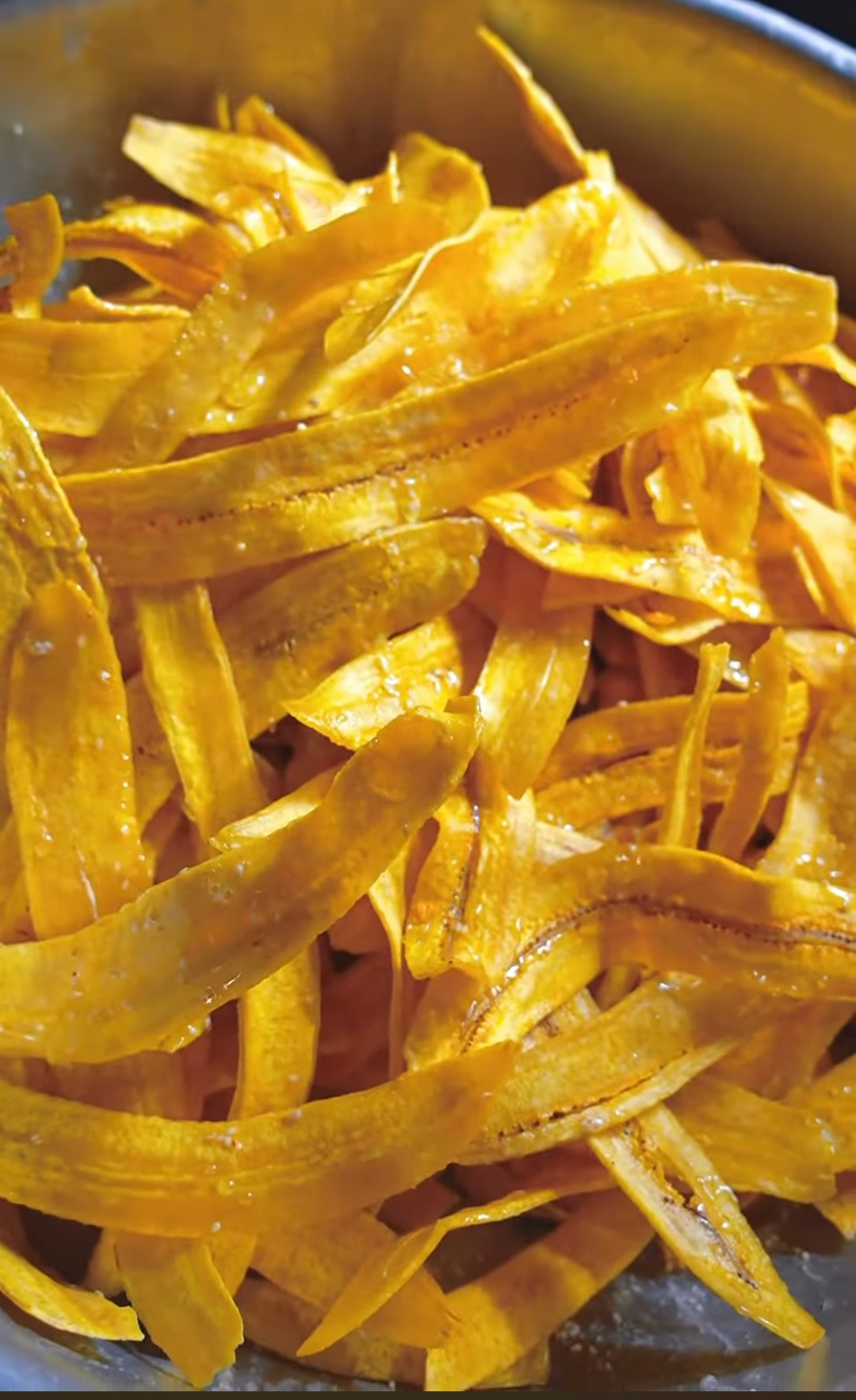
Dried taqua banana jam

Previously, taqua banana produced few fruits and was believed to bring bad luck, so Tra Vinh people only planted it in few quantities in the garden, for the purpose of worshiping, eating or giving as a gift, but rarely planted it for trade. Nowadays, taqua bananas are no longer believed to bring bad luck but have become a cultivar that is propagated everywhere because this fruit has high nutritional value as well as economic value, and consumption demand is increasing. Currently, taqua bananas are sold on the market with prices ranging from 9,000 - 12,000 VND/fruit, retail price in Hanoi is up to 25,000 VND/fruit. For seedlings, the price ranges from 150,000 - 450,000 VND/seedling depending on the size.

In August 2022, Tan Qui Cooperative (An Phu Tan commune, Cầu Kè district) successfully researched and produced dried taqua banana jam products and sold them on the market. The people's committee of Trà Vinh province certified OCOP 3 stars for this product on December 30, 2022. This product does not use preservatives or additives to maintain the sweetness of bananas. Taqua banana jam is packaged, fully labeled and sold well on the market, rather attracting customers. On average, the cooperative purchases 1.2 - 1.5 tons of banana fruits/month and produces about 0.5 - 0.6 tons of dried banana jam. This product is sold at supermarkets and stores in neighboring provinces such as Cần Thơ, Vĩnh Long, Hồ Chí Minh city; customers in Hanoi also look to order products online. Along with traditional sales, the cooperative also connects with tiktokers to promote products at the garden, introduce production processes and livestream for sales. The OCOP program has contributed to improving the value, affirming the brand, and product quality for taqua bananas, and economic development for gardeners in Trà Vinh.

== See also ==
- Cầu Kè district, Trà Vinh province
- Cooking banana
