= Trà Vinh (disambiguation) =

Trà Vinh is a ward of Vĩnh Long province.

Trà Vinh may also refer to be one of the following places in Vietnam.

- Trà Vinh city, former city in Trà Vinh province
- Trà Vinh province, former province in Mekong Delta (today part of Vĩnh Long province)
