= Càng Long district =

Coordinates: 9.917°N 106.167°E

Càng Long district Huyện Càng Long
- District
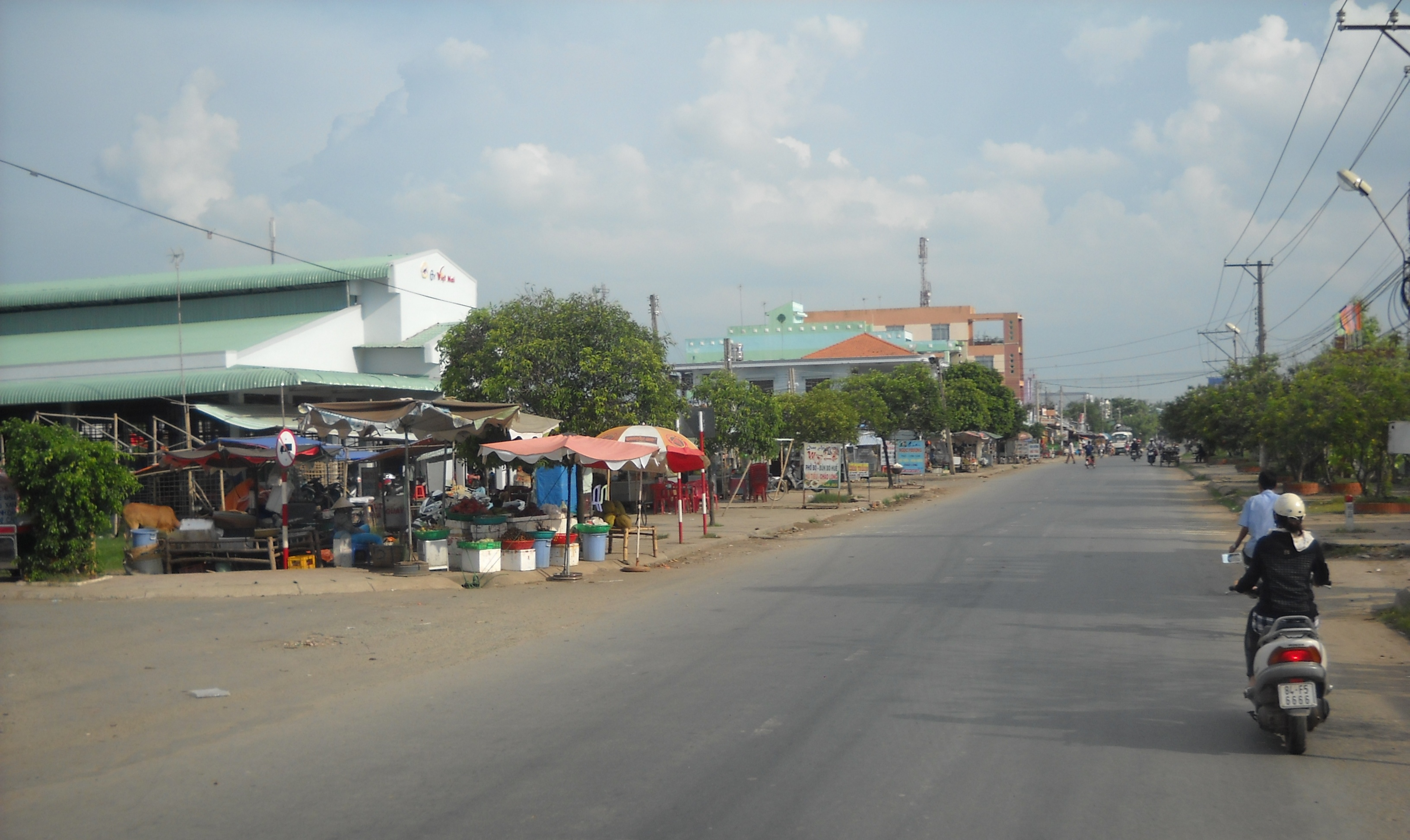
- Càng Long town road

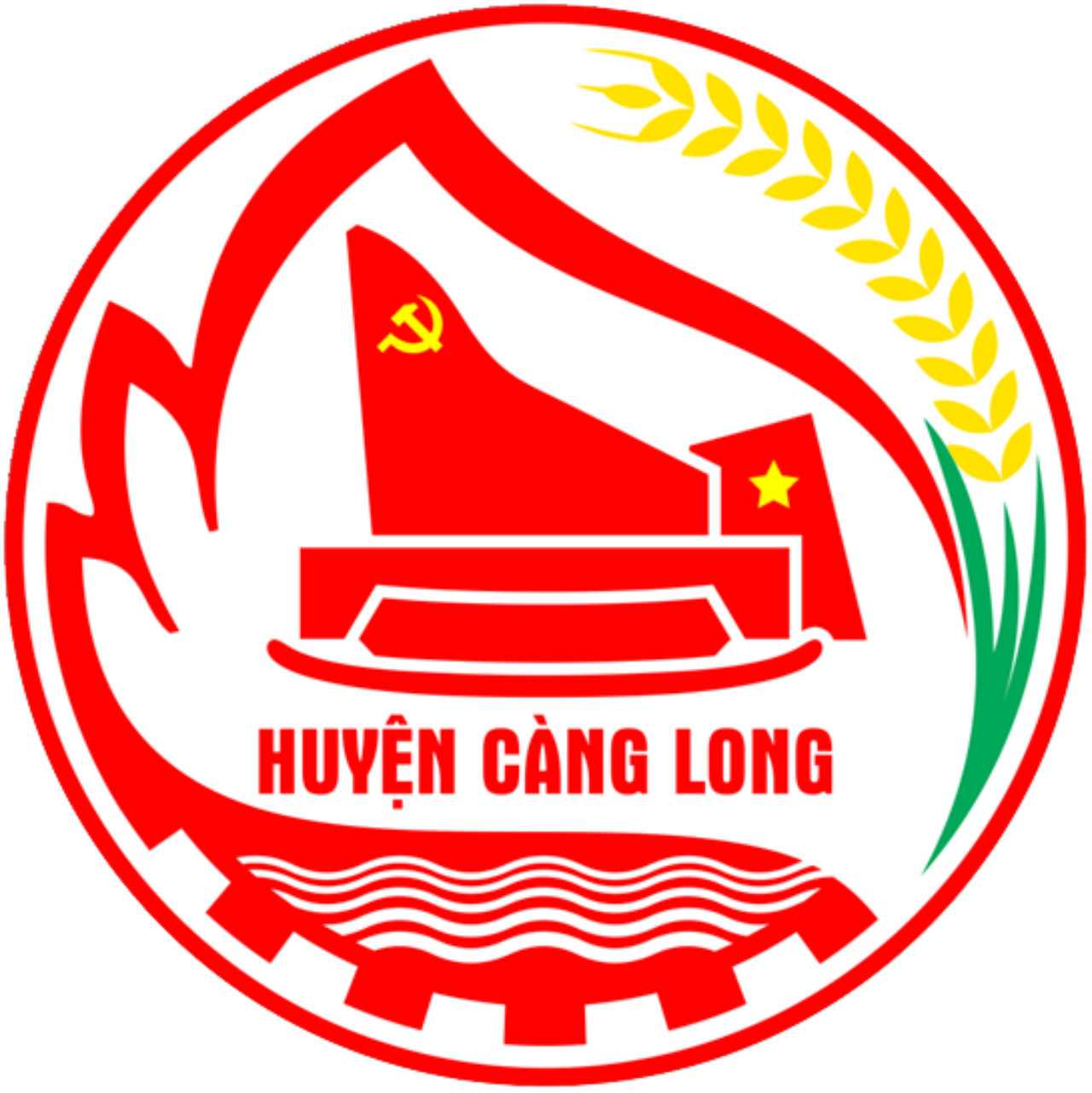
- Seal
- Interactive map of Càng Long district
- Country: Vietnam
- Region: Mekong Delta
- Province: Trà Vinh
- Capital: Càng Long

Area
  - Total: 11,587 sq mi (30,009 km^{2})

Population (2019)
  - Total: 287,955
- Time zone: UTC+7 (UTC + 7)

Càng Long was a rural district (huyện) of Trà Vinh province in the Mekong Delta region of Vietnam. As of 2019 the district had a population of 287,955. The district covers an area of 284 km^{2} (110 sq mi). The district capital lies at Càng Long. In Sino-Vietnamese script, used until 1945, the city's name is given as 冈隆.

On June 16, 2025, the Standing Committee of the National Assembly issued Resolution No. 1685/NQ-UBTVQH15. The district was dissolved and new wards were rearranged from the district.

== Geography ==
Càng Long district is located in the northern province of Trà Vinh. On the east side it borders the provincial capital city of Trà Vinh, Bến Tre province and boundary in the northeast and Châu Thành district in the southeast. To the north is Vũng Liêm district, Vĩnh Long.

Located in Bình Phú and Đại Phước Communes, two of Càng Long's 13 Communes is the National Highway Route 60 ( Quốc Lộ 60 - QL.60 ), the road that connects Trà Vinh and other provinces and cities such as Bến Tre and Hồ Chí Minh City, after the completion of Cổ Chiên Bridge on 16 May 2015, this National Highway Route 60 became the fastest and the most convenient way to Ho Chi Minh City, thanks to the highway and the new bridge, the travel distance between Tra Vinh and Ho Chi Minh City ( Saigon ) has been reduced by 70km.

The centre of the district, Càng Long Town, is located along the National Highway Route 53 ( Quốc Lộ 53 - QL.53 ), Trà Vinh City and Vĩnh Long City are 21 km and 43 km away respectively.

Càng Long district with QL.53 and QL.60 is the main economic, cultural and social gateway of Tra Vinh Province to other provinces, especially provinces in the Mekong River Delta region.

== Climate ==
Climate data for Càng Long district
Month	Jan	Feb	Mar	Apr	May	Jun	Jul	Aug	Sep	Oct	Nov	Dec	Year
Record high °C (°F)	34.3 (93.7)	35.0 (95.0)	36.3 (97.3)	38.1 (100.6)	38.3 (100.9)	36.1 (97.0)	34.8 (94.6)	34.6 (94.3)	35.0 (95.0)	34.8 (94.6)	34.3 (93.7)	34.4 (93.9)	38.3 (100.9)
Mean daily maximum °C (°F)	30.0 (86.0)	30.8 (87.4)	32.3 (90.1)	33.5 (92.3)	33.0 (91.4)	31.9 (89.4)	31.4 (88.5)	31.2 (88.2)	31.0 (87.8)	30.9 (87.6)	30.7 (87.3)	29.9 (85.8)	31.4 (88.5)
Daily mean °C (°F)	25.4 (77.7)	25.9 (78.6)	27.2 (81.0)	28.4 (83.1)	28.1 (82.6)	27.4 (81.3)	27.0 (80.6)	26.9 (80.4)	26.8 (80.2)	26.8 (80.2)	26.7 (80.1)	25.8 (78.4)	26.9 (80.4)
Mean daily minimum °C (°F)	22.6 (72.7)	22.8 (73.0)	23.9 (75.0)	25.0 (77.0)	25.3 (77.5)	24.8 (76.6)	24.5 (76.1)	24.5 (76.1)	24.5 (76.1)	24.5 (76.1)	24.3 (75.7)	23.1 (73.6)	24.2 (75.5)
Record low °C (°F)	17.0 (62.6)	17.8 (64.0)	18.5 (65.3)	21.9 (71.4)	22.4 (72.3)	21.4 (70.5)	21.1 (70.0)	21.7 (71.1)	22.2 (72.0)	21.4 (70.5)	19.6 (67.3)	17.2 (63.0)	17.0 (62.6)
Average precipitation mm (inches)	6.4 (0.25)	4.7 (0.19)	14.5 (0.57)	47.5 (1.87)	188.7 (7.43)	211.0 (8.31)	223.7 (8.81)	229.0 (9.02)	254.5 (10.02)	293.6 (11.56)	126.4 (4.98)	38.5 (1.52)	1,638.5 (64.53)
Average precipitation days	1.3	0.7	1.3	4.7	17.2	19.5	21.5	21.4	22.1	20.2	10.4	5.6	145.9
Average relative humidity (%)	80.6	79.2	78.8	79.9	84.8	86.4	87.1	87.5	88.1	87.4	85.1	83.0	84.0
Mean monthly sunshine hours	240.3	250.2	283.0	259.7	206.8	171.0	182.2	177.0	157.5	171.2	199.6	203.7	2,502.2
Source: Vietnam Institute for Building Science and Technology
