= Trà Vinh city =

Trà Vinh
- Provincial city (Class-2)
- Trà Vinh City; Thành phố Trà Vinh
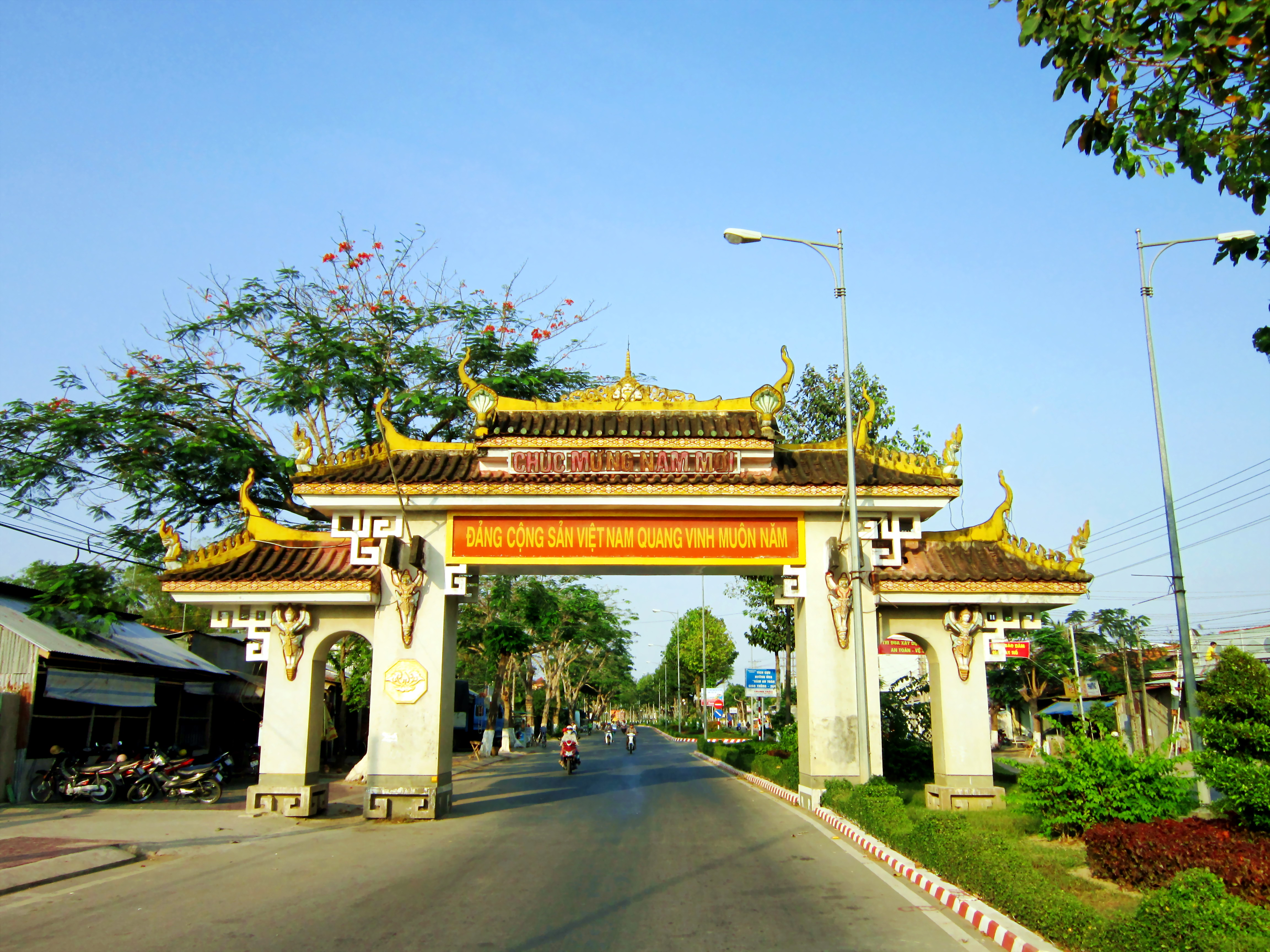
- /0/queryThe property query is required; /0/idsThe property ids is required; /0Failed to match at least one schema; /0/titleThe property title is required; /0/serviceDoes not have a value in the enumeration ["page"]; /0Failed to match exactly one schema; /0/geometriesThe property geometries is required; /0/typeDoes not have a value in the enumeration ["GeometryCollection"]; /0/typeDoes not have a value in the enumeration ["MultiPolygon"]; /0/typeDoes not have a value in the enumeration ["Point"]; /0/typeDoes not have a value in the enumeration ["MultiPoint"]; /0/typeDoes not have a value in the enumeration ["LineString"]; /0/typeDoes not have a value in the enumeration ["MultiLineString"]; /0/typeDoes not have a value in the enumeration ["Polygon"]; /0/coordinatesThe property coordinates is required; /0/geometryThe property geometry is required; /0/typeDoes not have a value in the enumeration ["Feature"]; /0/featuresThe property features is required; /0/typeDoes not have a value in the enumeration ["FeatureCollection"]
- Location within Vietnam
- Coordinates: 9°56′N 106°21′E
- Country: Vietnam
- Region: Mekong Delta
- Province: Trà Vinh

Area
  - Provincial city (Class-2): 68.035 km^{2} (26.268 sq mi)
  - Urban: 138 km^{2} (53 sq mi)

Population (2018)
  - Provincial city (Class-2): 160,310
  - Density: 2,356.3/km^{2} (6,102.8/sq mi)
- Time zone: UTC+7 (UTC + 7)

Trà Vinh City (lit. 'Sacred pond') is a former city belonging to Trà Vinh province in Mekong Delta, Vietnam.

== Etymology ==
Trà Vang was an old name used for this area, a hinterland with a sparse population.

In 1825, the area of Trà Vinh was established by King Minh Mạng into Lạc Hóa district also known as chà-văng or chà-vinh.

In 1951, the name Vĩnh Trà appeared, a combination of Vĩnh Trà from Vĩnh Long and Trà from Trà Vinh.

The name was changed again from Trà Vinh to Vĩnh Binh in 1957 with Phú Vinh as its capital city.

In 1976, Cửu Long province came to be by merging Vĩnh Long province and Trà Vinh.

The name Trà Vinh comes from the Khmer name of the area ព្រះត្រពាំង Preah Trapeang, which means Sacred pond or Buddha's pond. The Vietnamese transliteration gave Trà Vang and later Trà Vinh.

== Location ==
It is located in the Mekong Delta region, which is in the Southern part of Vietnam. Under the Republic of Vietnam, it was the provincial capital of a province with a population of 51,535.

Government Resolution No. 11/NQ-CP 04/03/2010 established the city of Trà Vinh with an area of 6,803.5 hectares and a population of 131,360 inhabitants and 10 administrative units.

On February 15, 2016, Trà Vinh City was classified as a level II city in Vietnam's cities classification system.

Trà Vinh had 1,286,000 inhabitants in 2019.

== Administrative divisions ==
The area directly under the town consists of:

- 9 urban wards: numbered from 1 to 9
- 1 rural communes: Long Đức

== Climate ==
Climate data for Trà Vinh (Càng Long)
Month	Jan	Feb	Mar	Apr	May	Jun	Jul	Aug	Sep	Oct	Nov	Dec	Year
Record high °C (°F)	34.1 (93.4)	34.8 (94.6)	36.3 (97.3)	37.0 (98.6)	37.7 (99.9)	35.3 (95.5)	34.8 (94.6)	34.6 (94.3)	34.9 (94.8)	34.5 (94.1)	34.3 (93.7)	34.4 (93.9)	37.7 (99.9)
Mean daily maximum °C (°F)	30.0 (86.0)	30.8 (87.4)	32.3 (90.1)	33.5 (92.3)	33.0 (91.4)	31.9 (89.4)	31.4 (88.5)	31.2 (88.2)	31.0 (87.8)	30.9 (87.6)	30.7 (87.3)	29.9 (85.8)	31.4 (88.5)
Daily mean °C (°F)	25.4 (77.7)	25.9 (78.6)	27.2 (81.0)	28.4 (83.1)	28.1 (82.6)	27.4 (81.3)	27.0 (80.6)	26.9 (80.4)	26.8 (80.2)	26.8 (80.2)	26.7 (80.1)	25.8 (78.4)	26.9 (80.4)
Mean daily minimum °C (°F)	22.6 (72.7)	22.8 (73.0)	23.9 (75.0)	25.0 (77.0)	25.3 (77.5)	24.8 (76.6)	24.5 (76.1)	24.5 (76.1)	24.5 (76.1)	24.5 (76.1)	24.3 (75.7)	23.1 (73.6)	24.2 (75.5)
Record low °C (°F)	17.0 (62.6)	17.8 (64.0)	18.5 (65.3)	21.9 (71.4)	22.4 (72.3)	21.4 (70.5)	21.1 (70.0)	21.7 (71.1)	22.2 (72.0)	21.4 (70.5)	19.6 (67.3)	17.2 (63.0)	17.0 (62.6)
Average precipitation mm (inches)	6.4 (0.25)	4.7 (0.19)	14.5 (0.57)	47.5 (1.87)	188.7 (7.43)	211.0 (8.31)	223.7 (8.81)	229.0 (9.02)	254.5 (10.02)	293.6 (11.56)	126.4 (4.98)	38.5 (1.52)	1,638.5 (64.53)
Average rainy days	1.3	0.7	1.3	4.7	17.2	19.5	21.5	21.4	22.1	20.2	10.4	5.6	145.9
Average relative humidity (%)	80.6	79.2	78.8	79.9	84.8	86.4	87.1	87.5	88.1	87.4	85.1	83.0	84.0
Mean monthly sunshine hours	240.3	250.2	283.0	259.7	206.8	171.0	182.2	177.0	157.5	171.2	199.6	203.7	2,502.2
Source: Vietnam Institute for Building Science and Technology

== Gallery ==
Photos taken in Trà Vinh city:

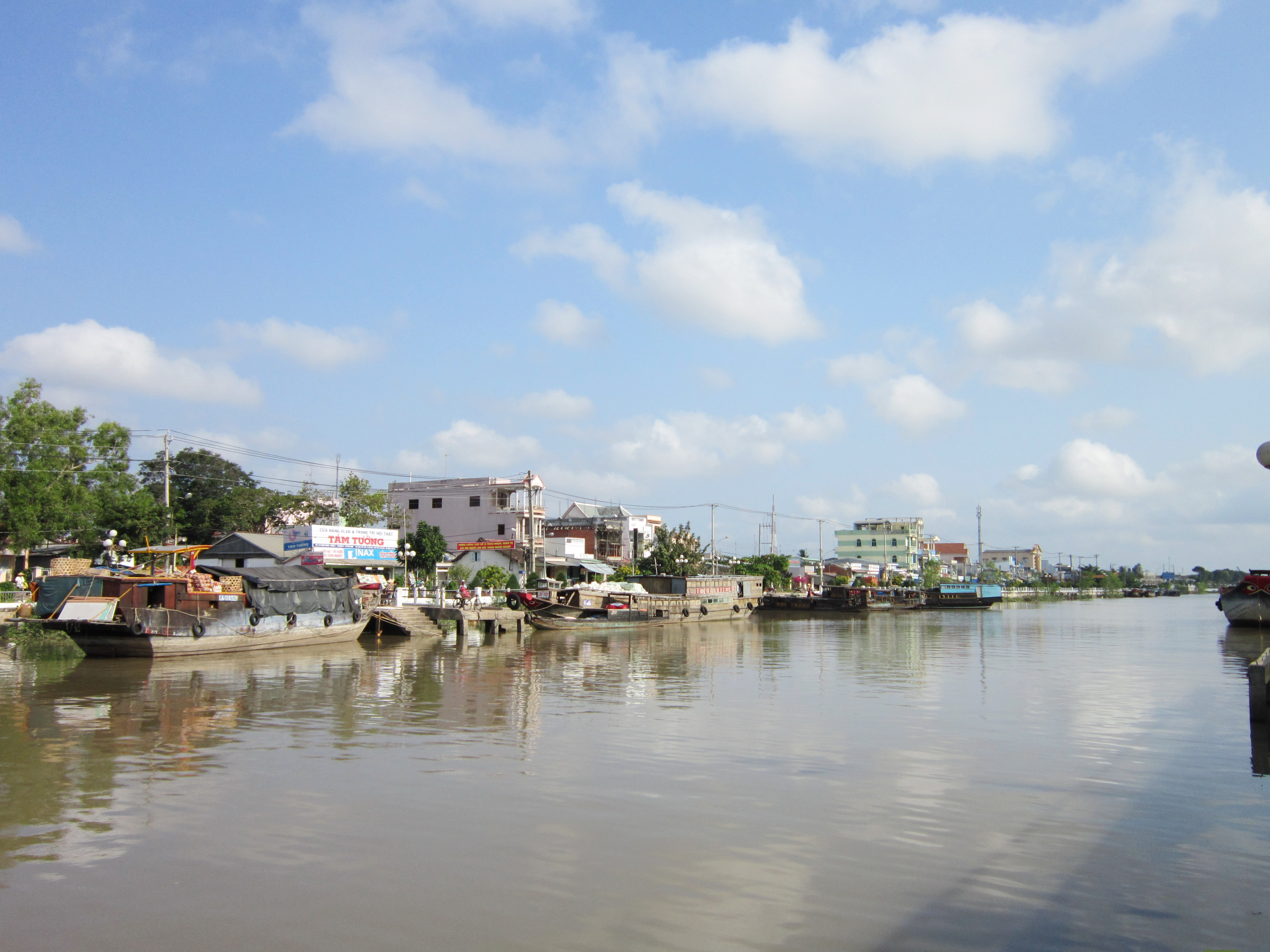
Canal in the city.

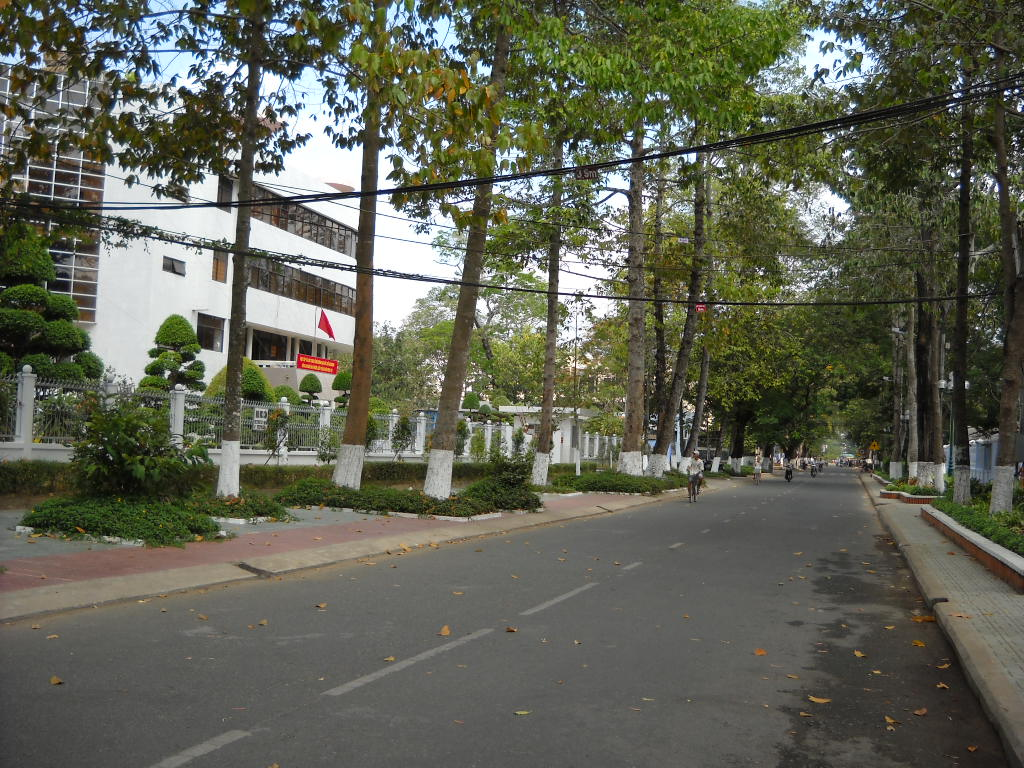
One street.

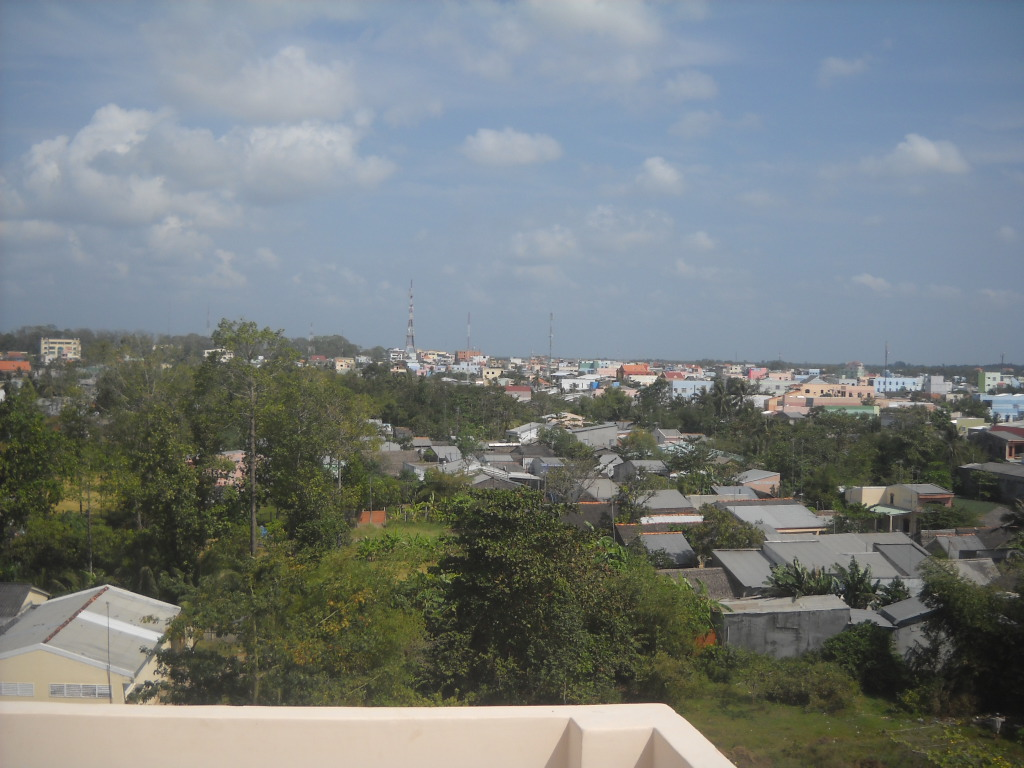
A corner of Trà Vinh city.

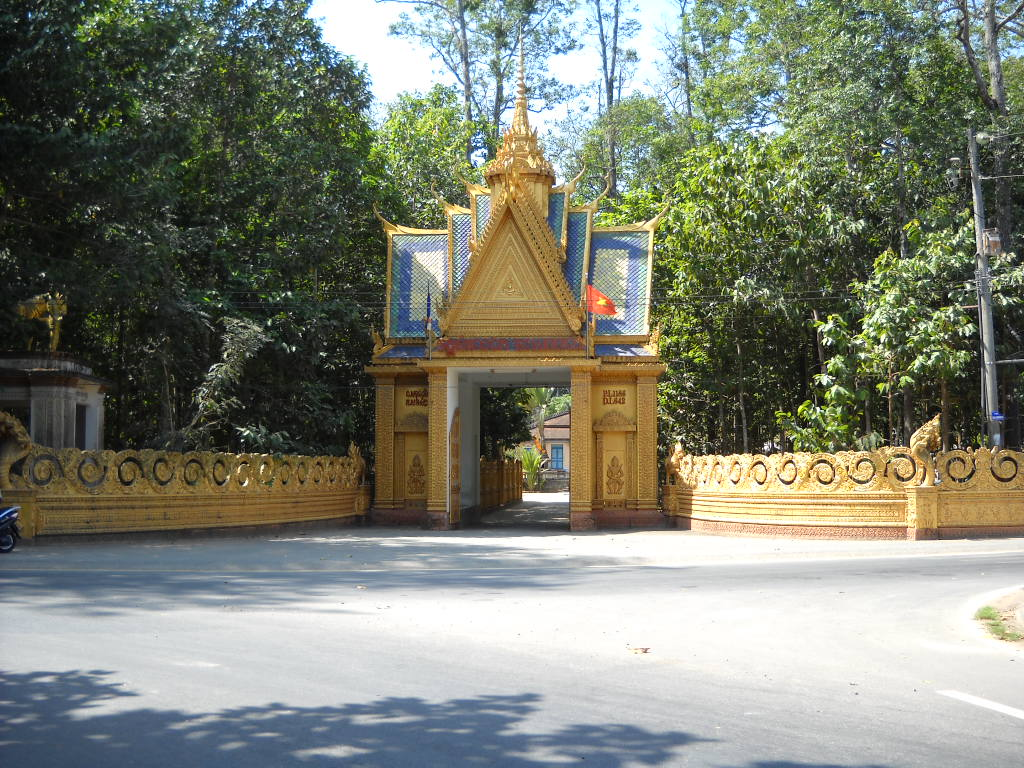
Khmer Watsamrongek Pagoda in Ward 8

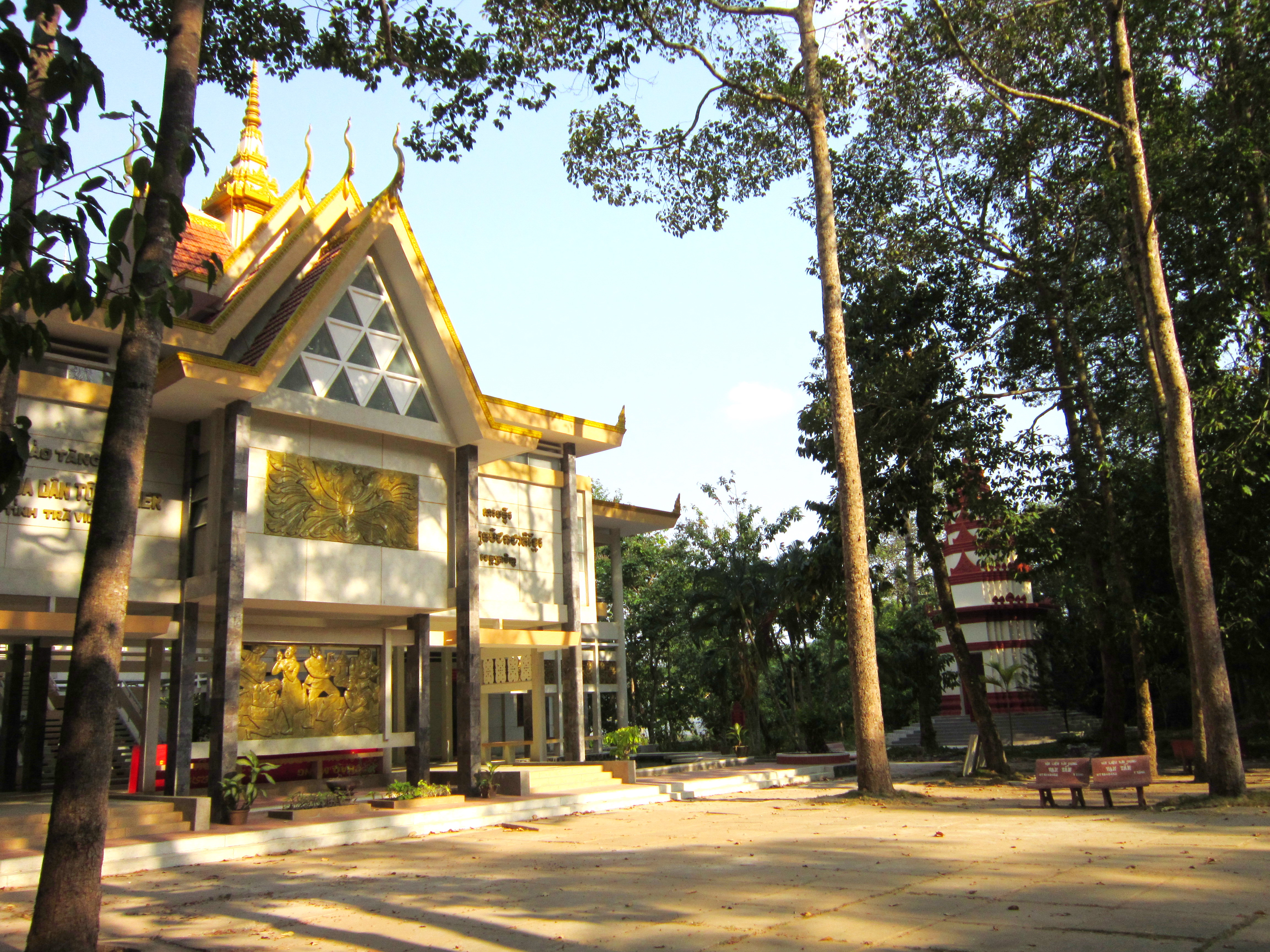
Khmer Museum in Trà Vinh

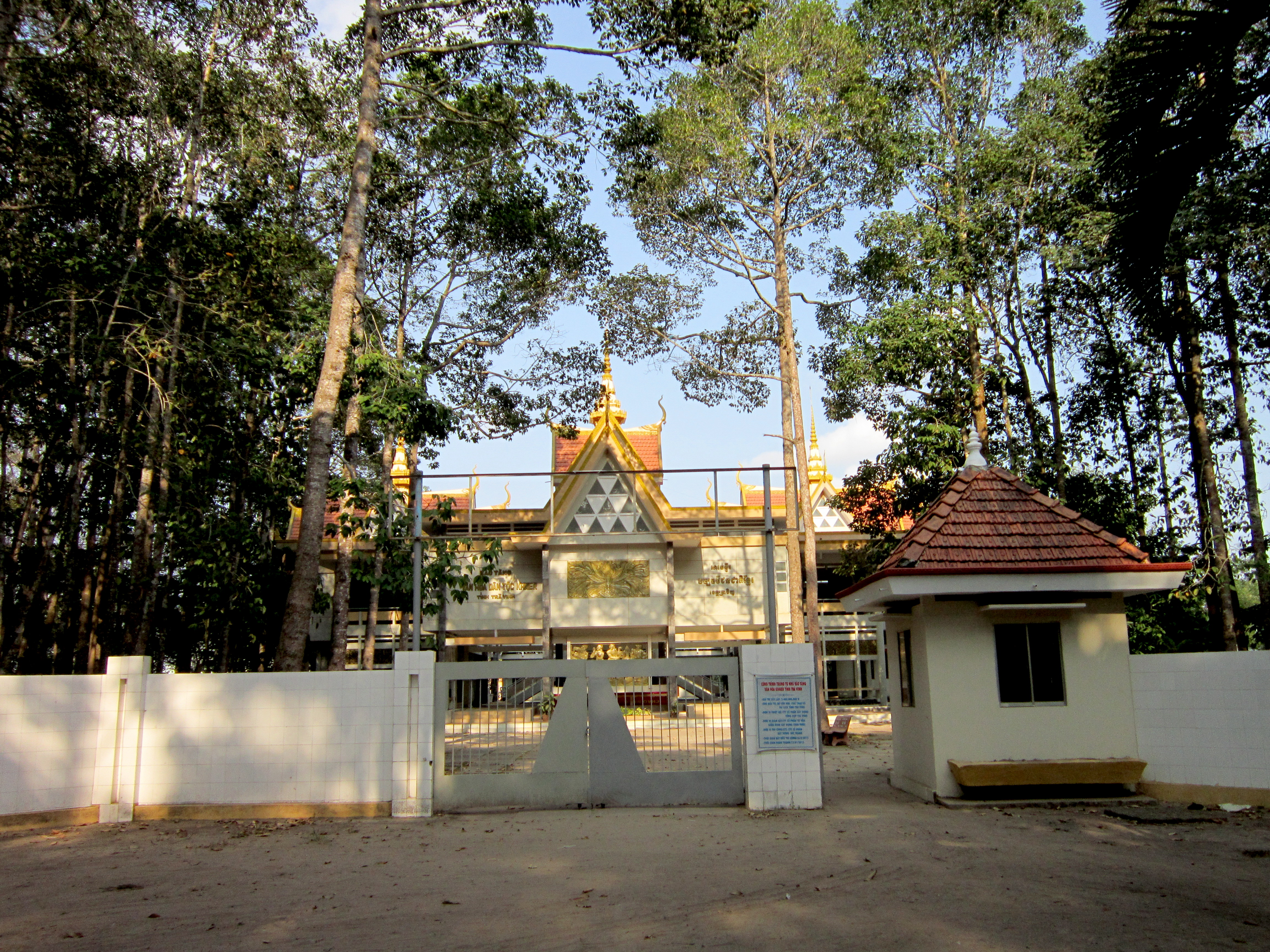
Museum of Khmer Ethnic Culture in Trà Vinh province

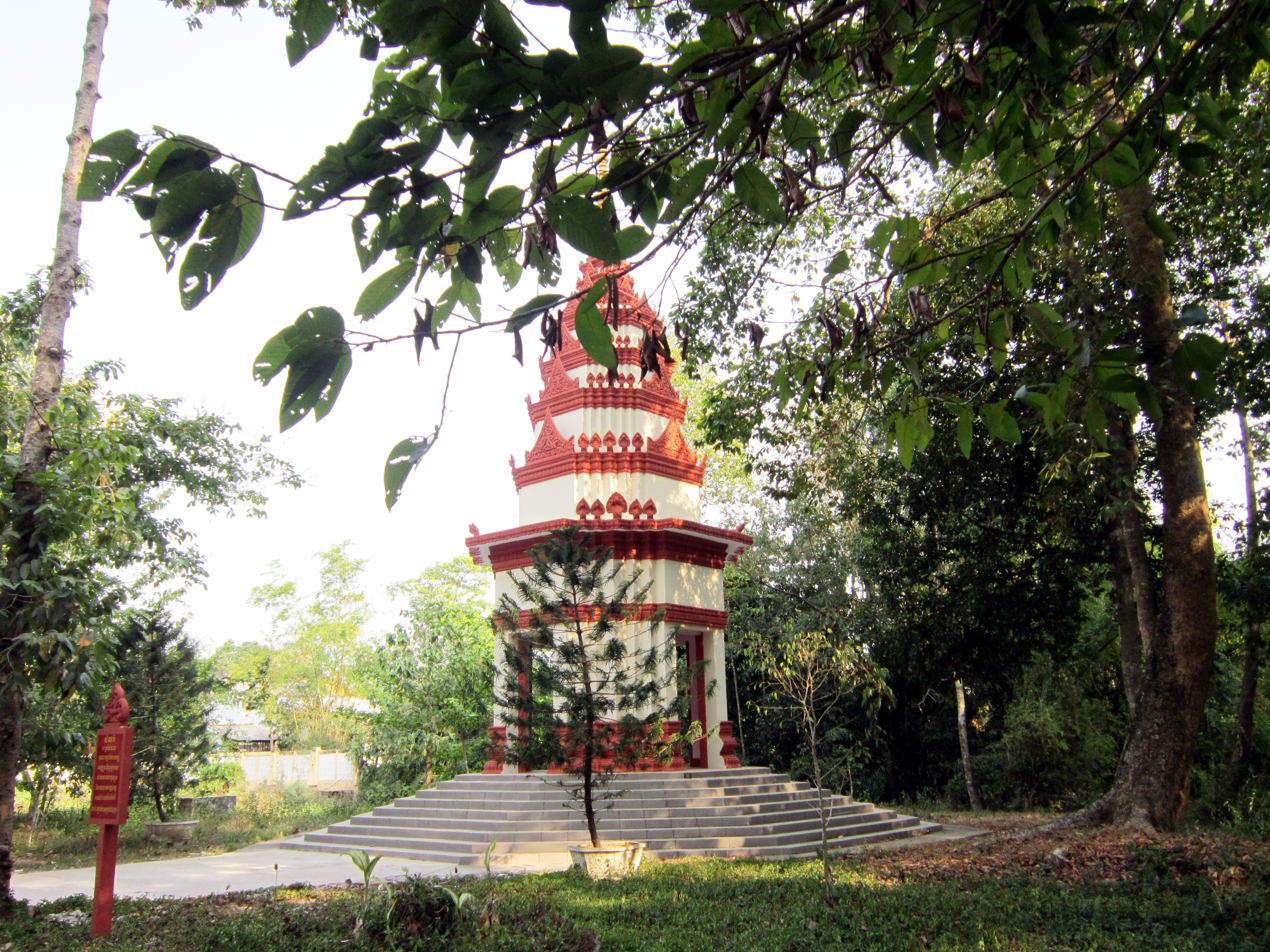
A tower on the grounds of the Khmer Ethnic Cultural Museum in Trà Vinh province

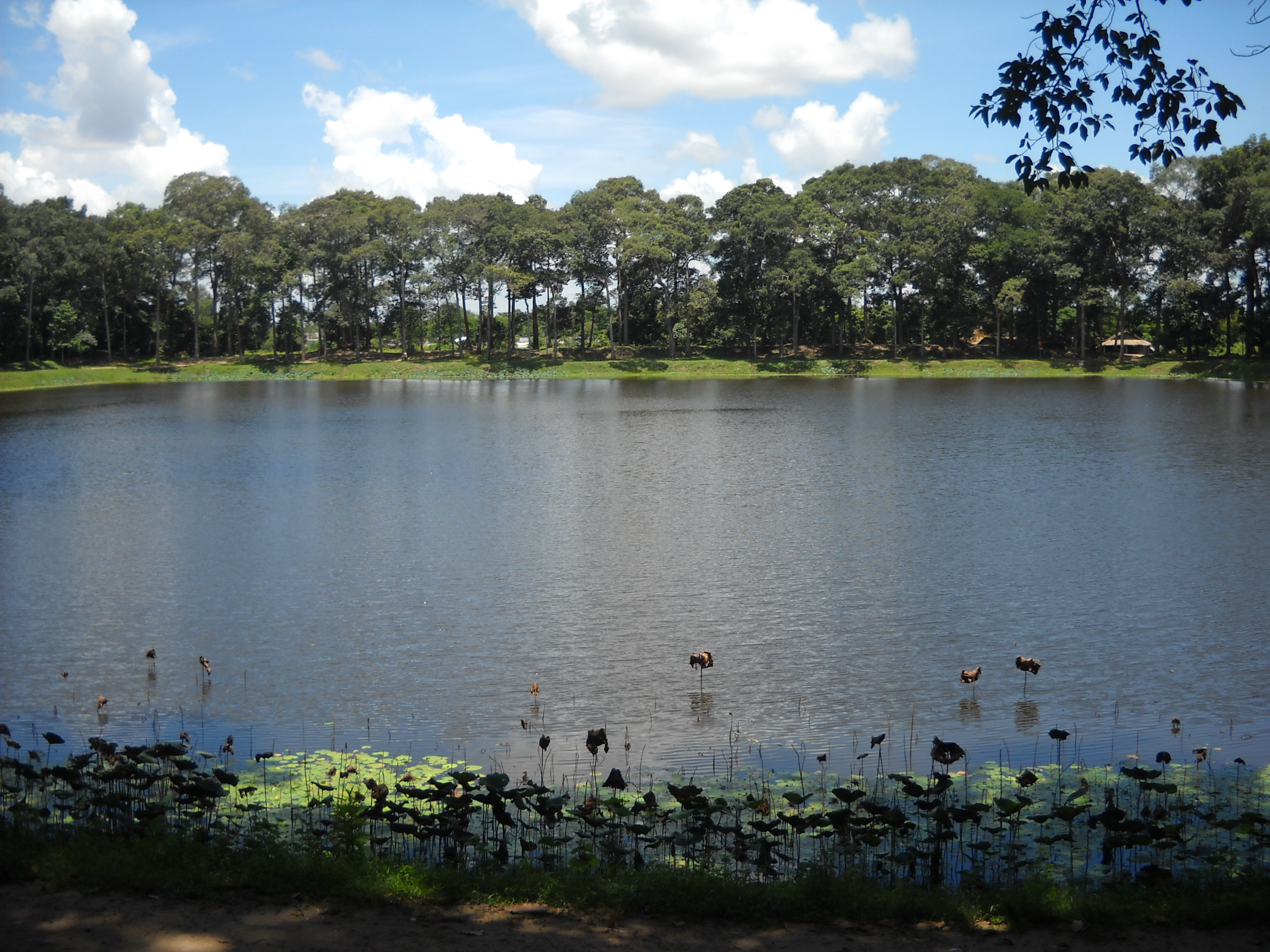
Bà Om Pond

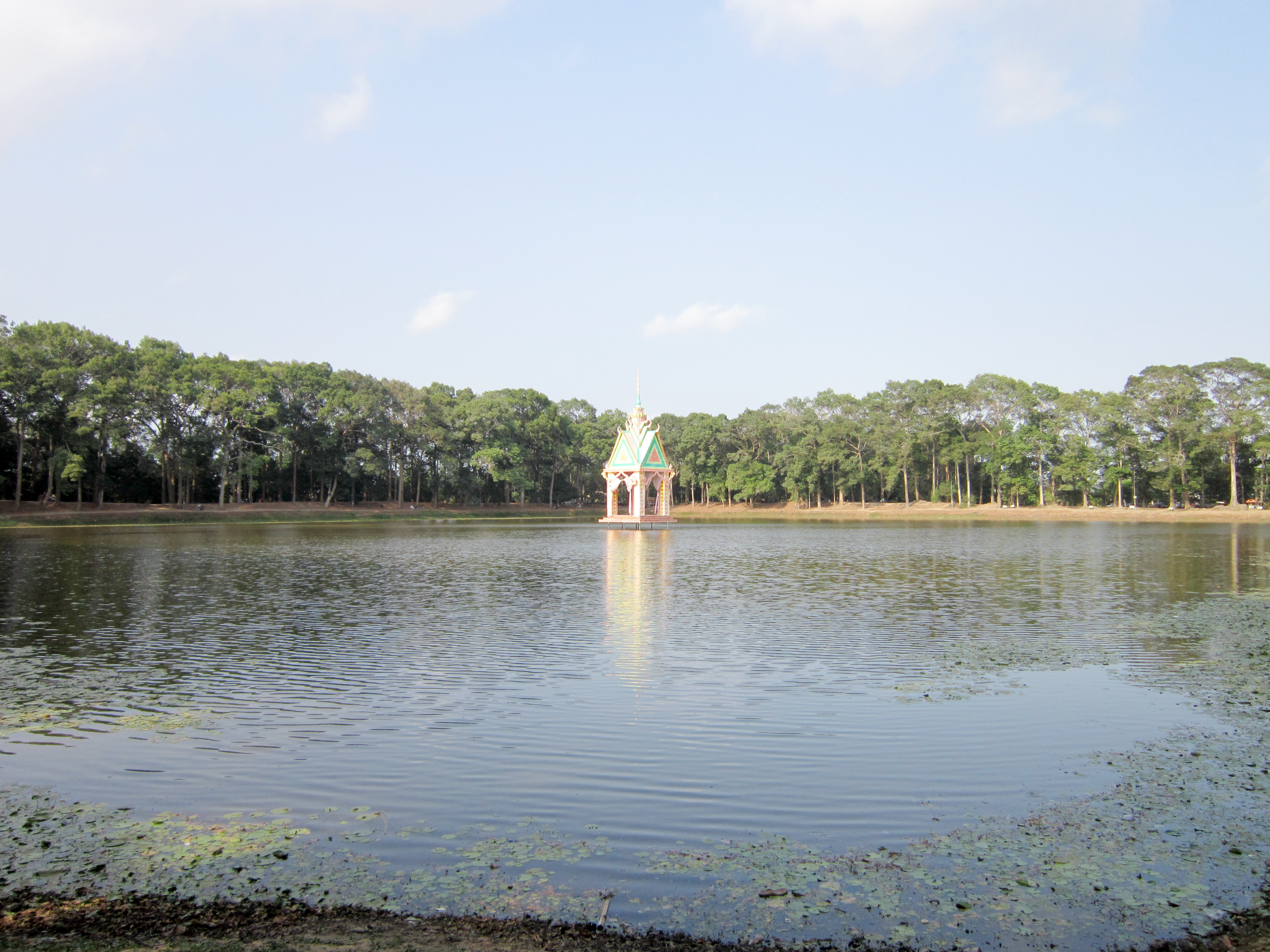
Bà Om Pond

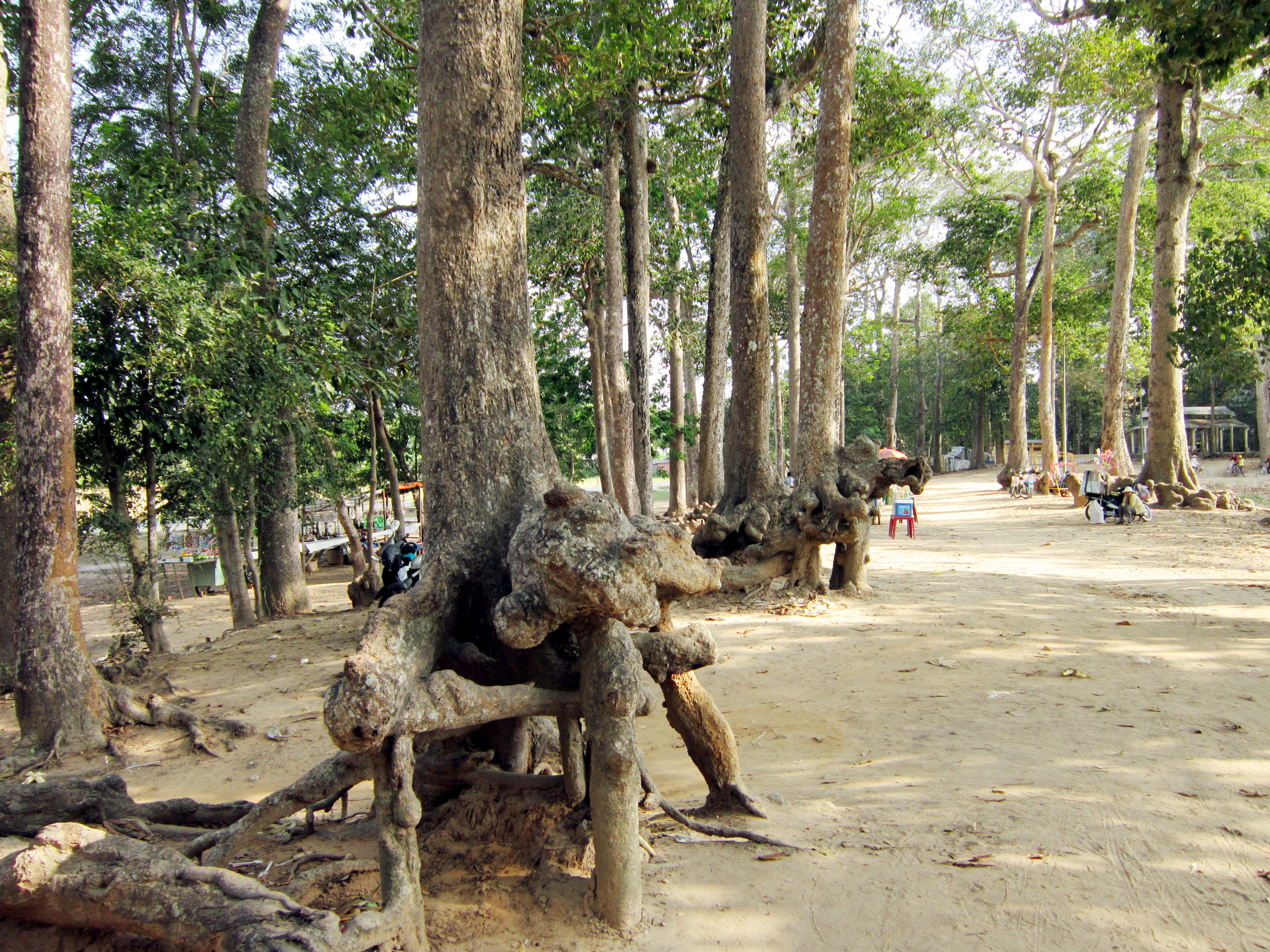
Around the pond there are many ancient trees hundreds of years old

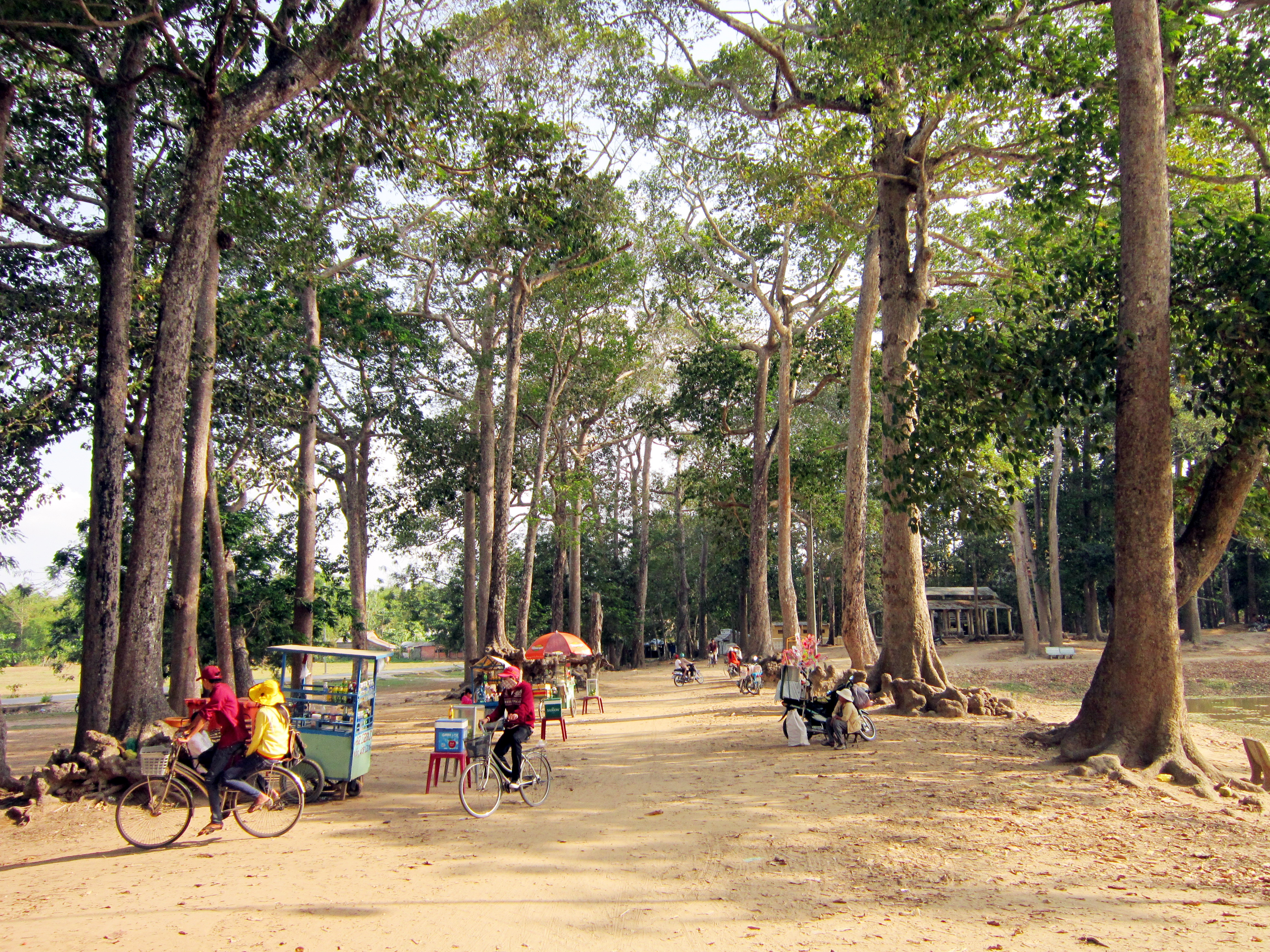
People often come to the pond area to have fun

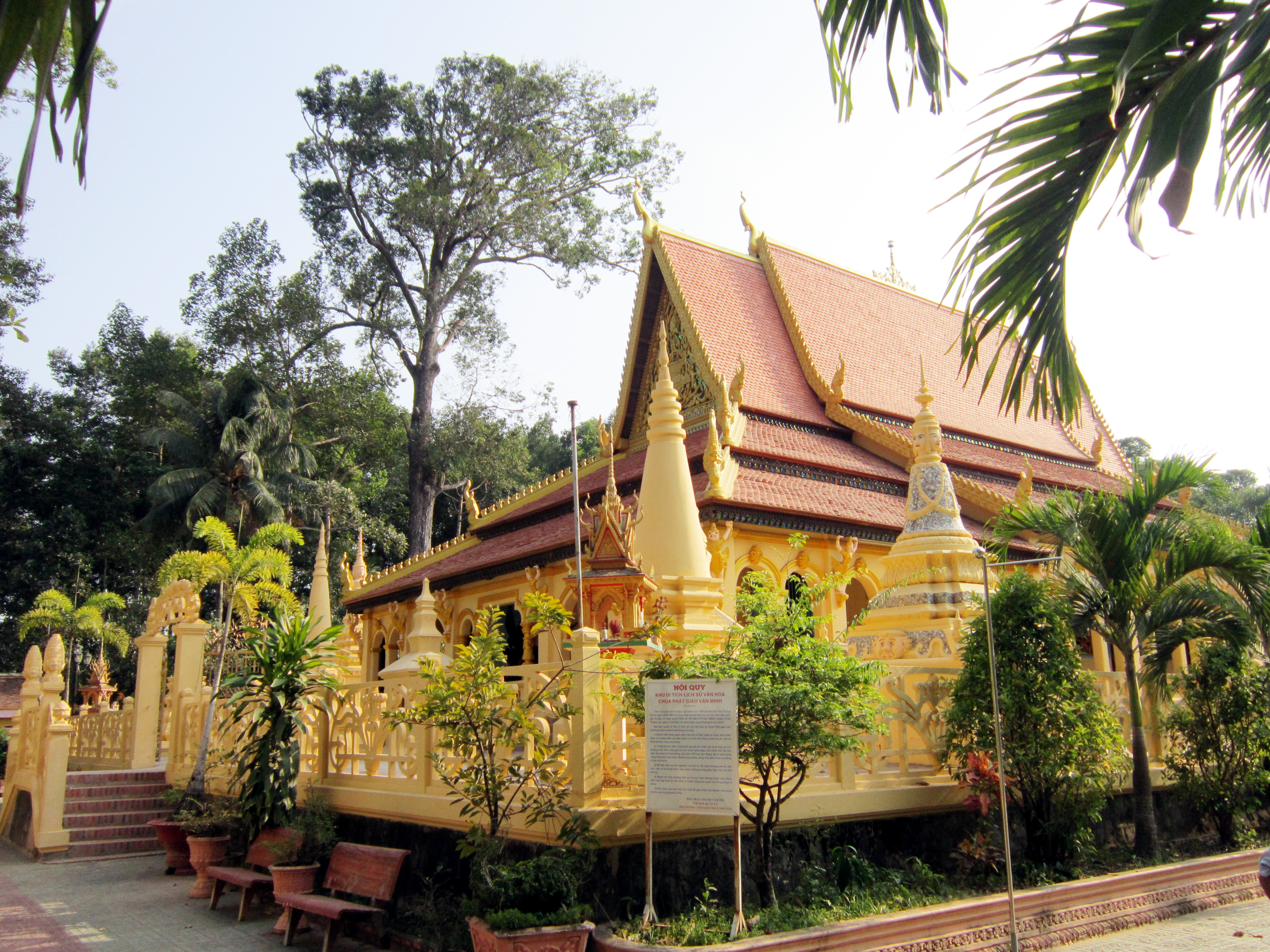
Next to the pond is an ancient pagoda (Âng pagoda, name Khmer: Angkorajaborey)

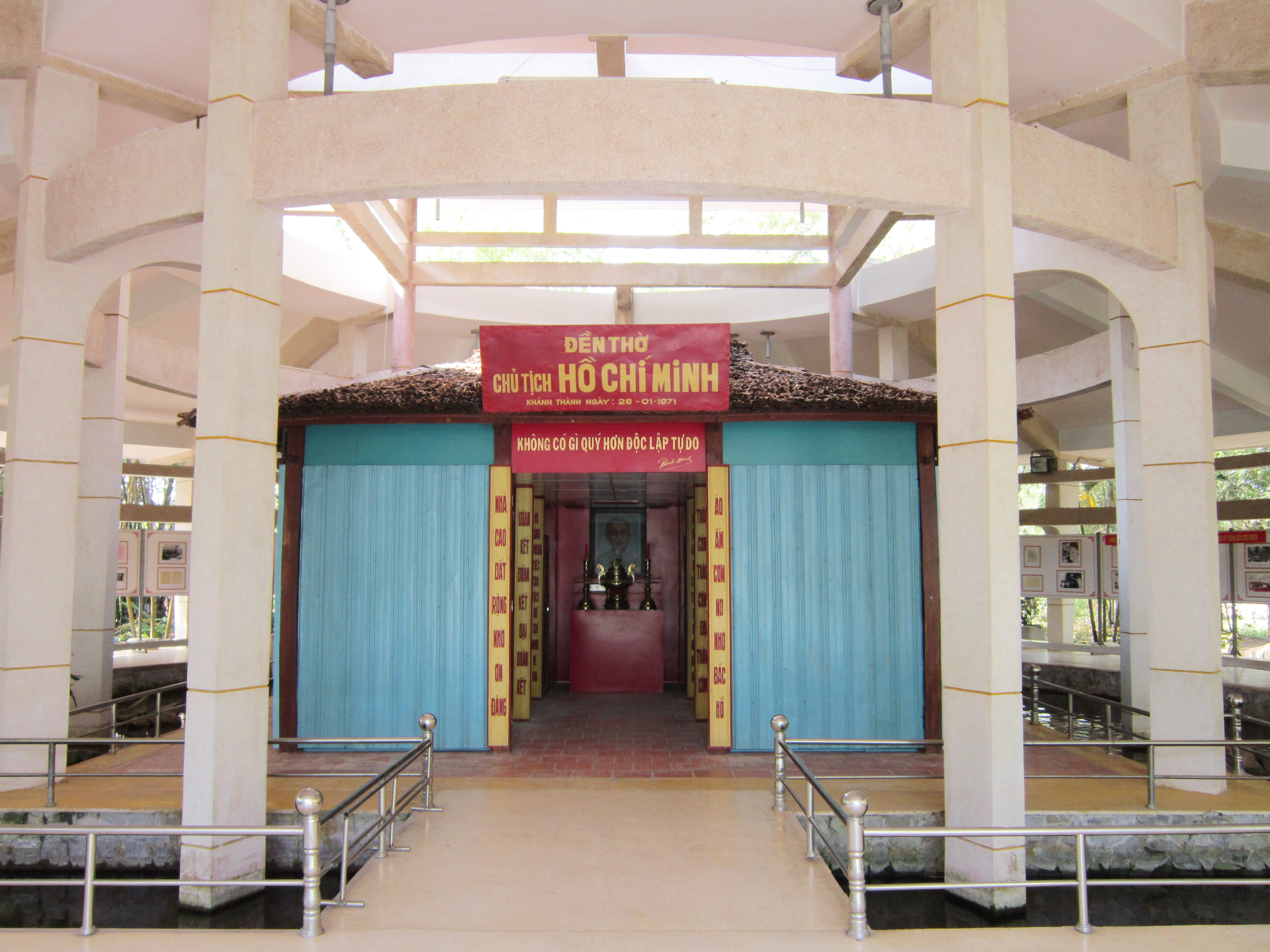
Front view of President Hồ Chí Minh's shrine

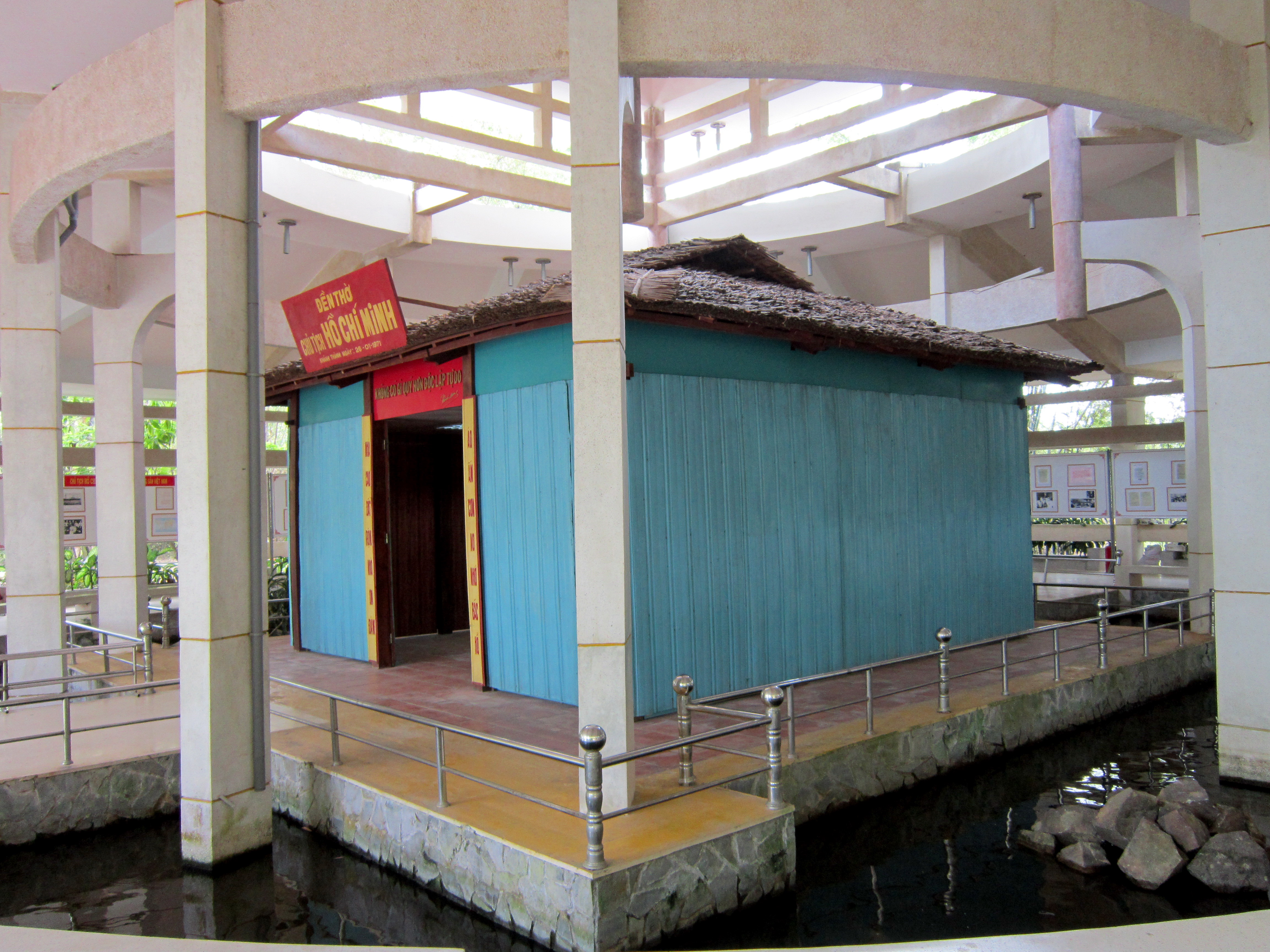
Shrine of President Ho Chi Minh in Long Đức

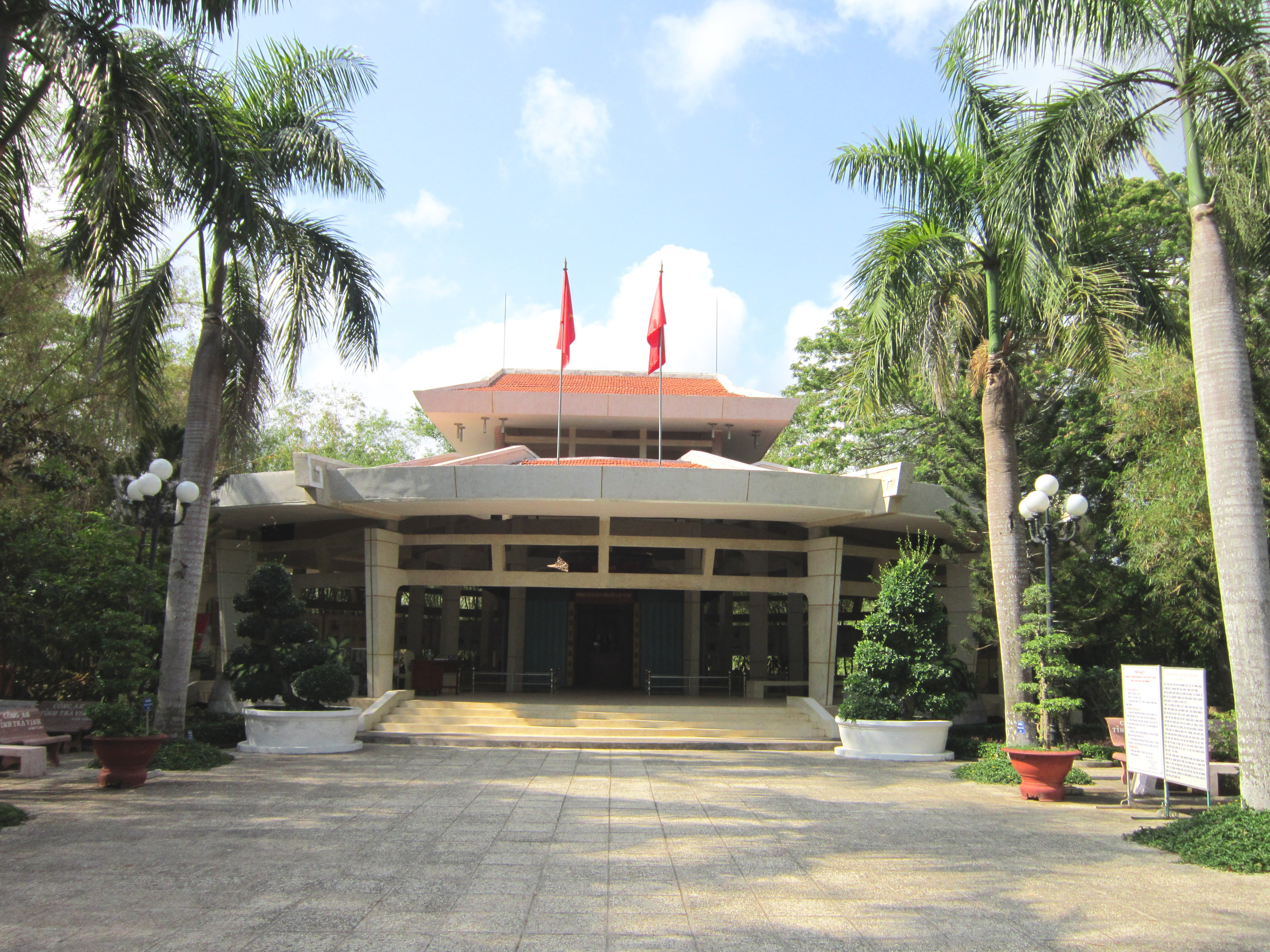
The building was built after 1975 to surround and preserve the temple

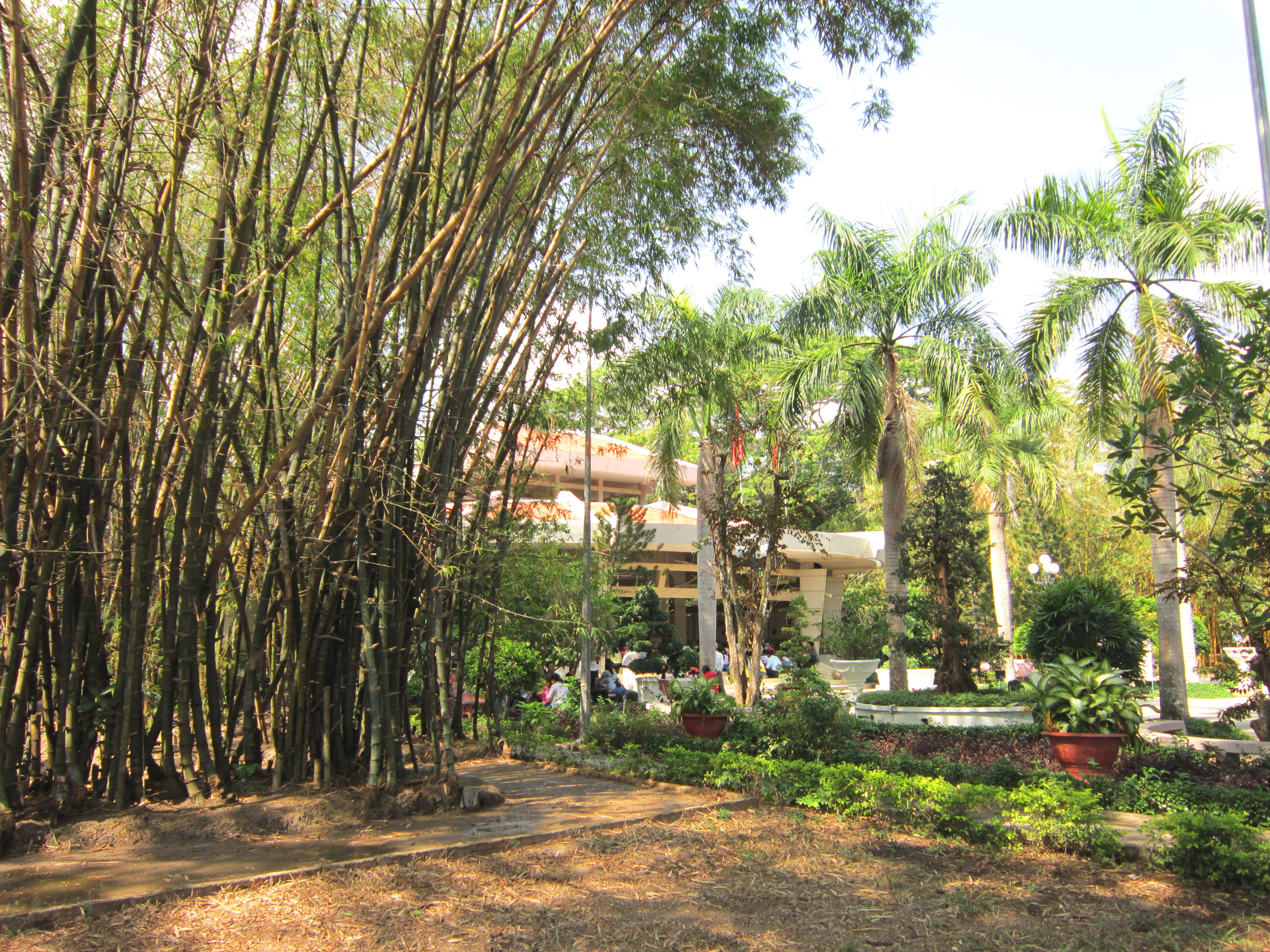
One of the bamboo bushes planted before 1975, to protect the temple

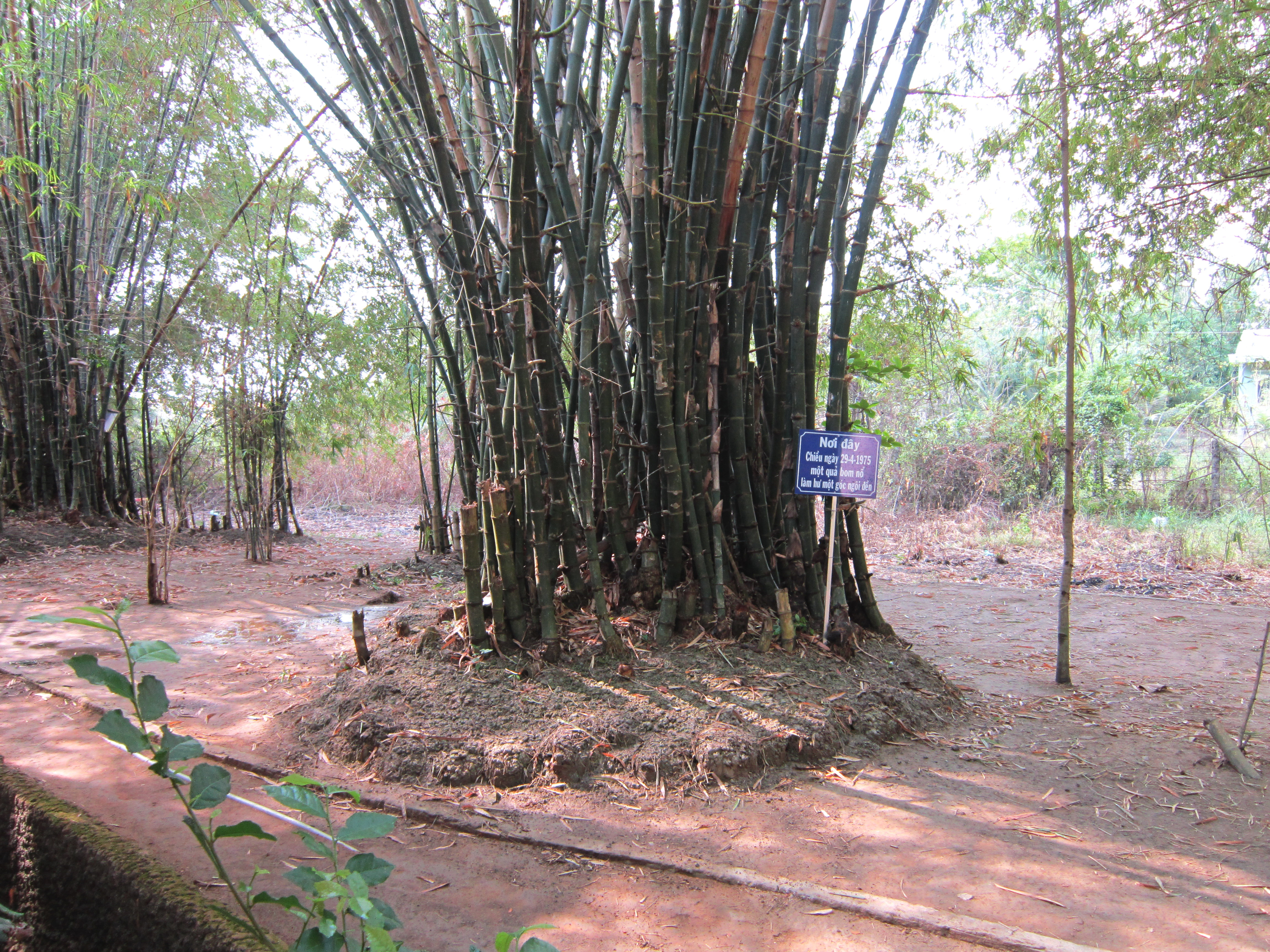
On April 29, 1975, a bomb exploded in this bamboo bush, damaging part of the temple.

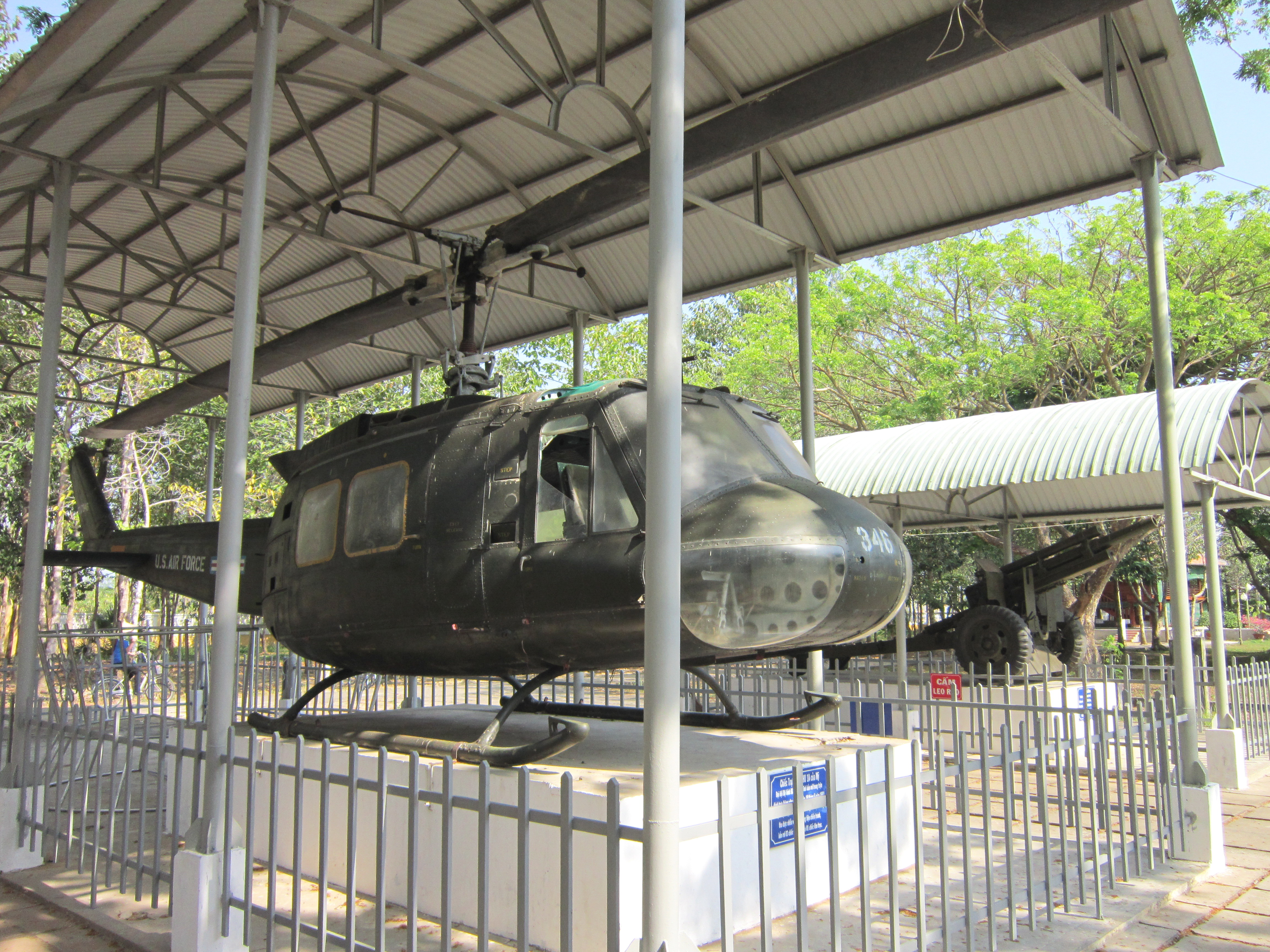
Captive ARVN aircraft and artillery displays in the temple area

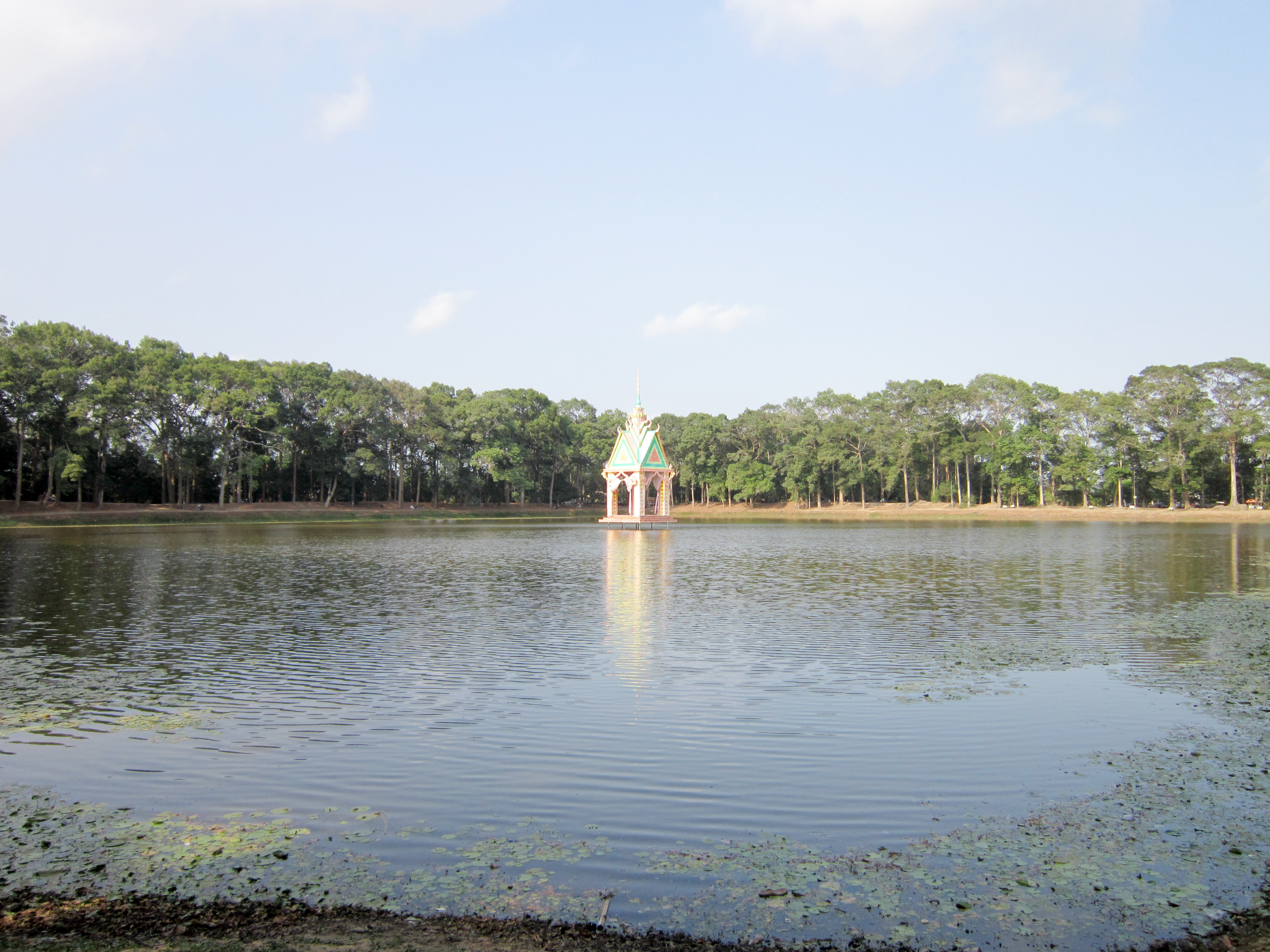
Bà Om Pond in Trà Vinh city
