= Tiểu Cần district =

Coordinates: 9.833°N 106.167°E

Tiểu Cần district Huyện Tiểu Cần
- District
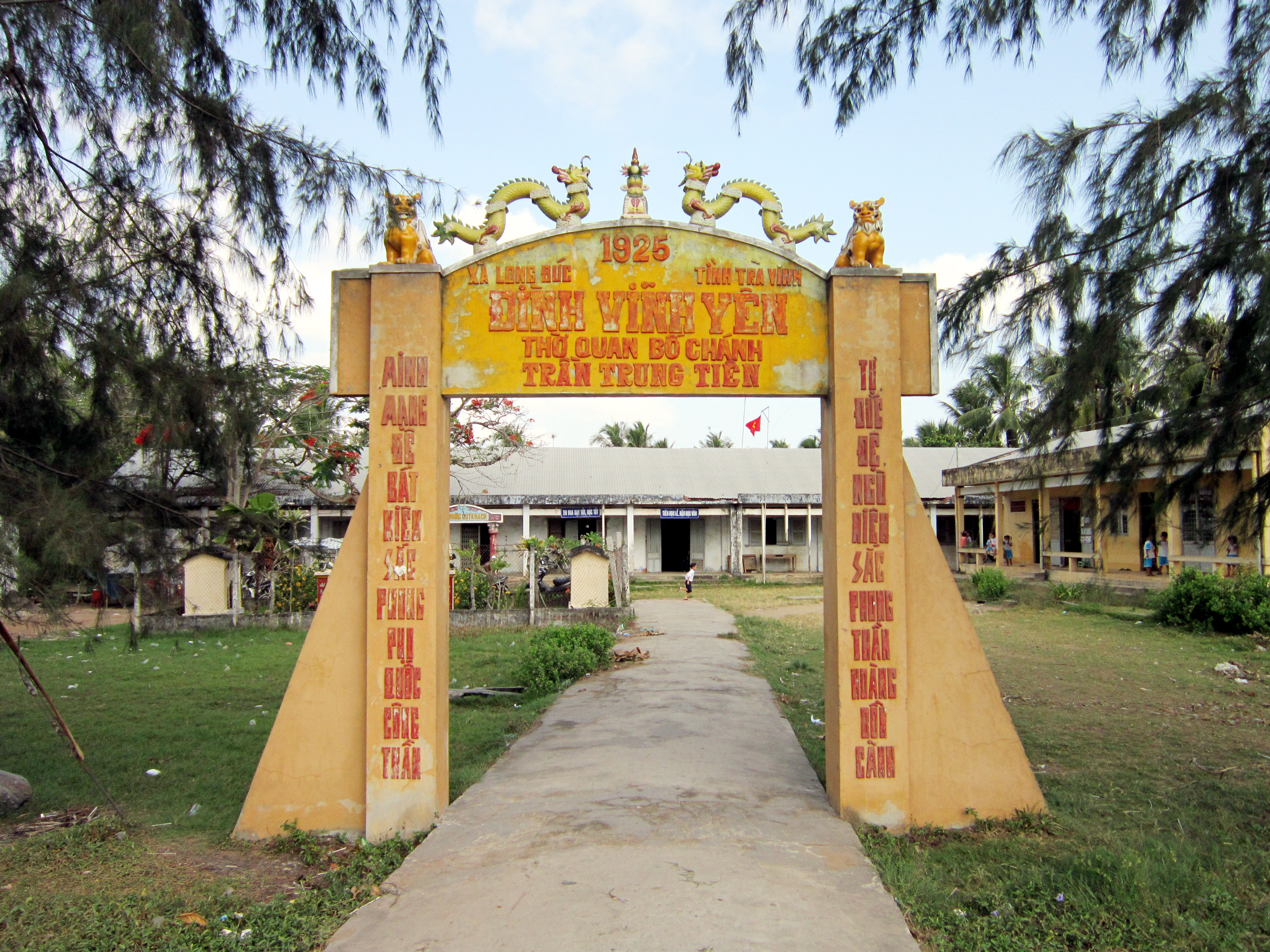
- Vinh Yen communal gate in Tra Vinh City, Vietnam. The house was hidden by a school behind. In the communal house there is an altar of Bo Chanh Tran Trung Tien (or Tran Tuyen).
- Country: Vietnam
- Region: Mekong Delta
- Province: Trà Vinh
- Capital: Tiểu Cần

Area
  - Total: 85 sq mi (220 km^{2})

Population (2003)
  - Total: 108,718
- Time zone: UTC+7 (UTC + 7)

Tiểu Cần is a rural district of Trà Vinh province in the Mekong Delta region of Vietnam. As of 2003 the district had a population of 108,718. The district covers an area of 220 km^{2}. The district capital lies at Tiểu Cần.
