= Càng Long =

Càng Long Phường Càng Long
- Ward
- Càng Long ward
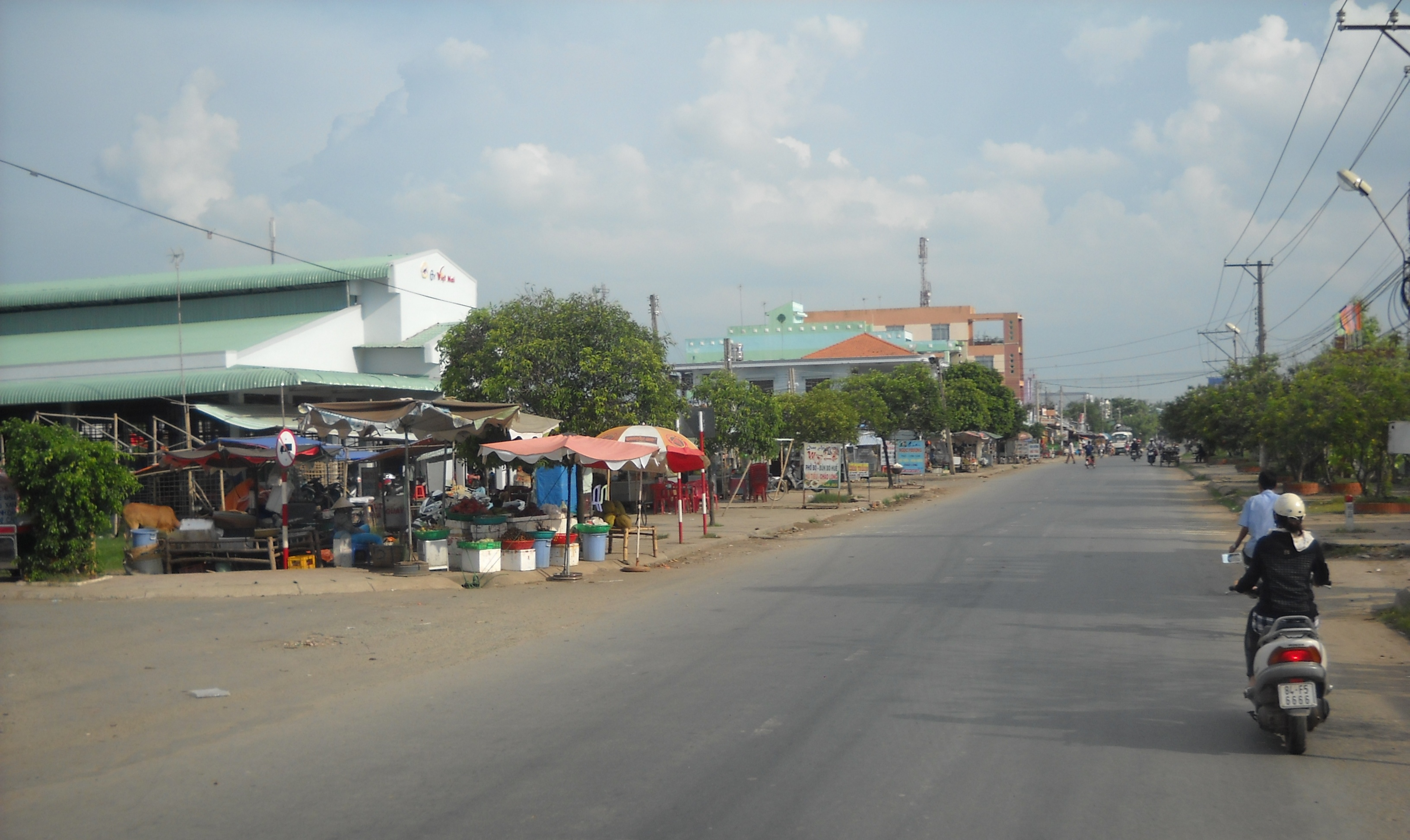
- A corner of Càng Long Ward

- Location within Vietnam
- Coordinates: 9°59′22″N 106°12′12″E
- Country: Vietnam
- Region: Mekong Delta
- Province: Vĩnh Long
- Establish: June 16, 2025

Area
  - Total: 46.87 km^{2} (18.10 sq mi)

Population 2025
  - Total: 41.542 people
  - Density: 0.8863/km^{2} (2.296/sq mi)
- Time zone: UTC+7 (UTC + 7)

Càng Long is a ward (phường) of Vĩnh Long Province, Vietnam.

== Geography ==
Càng Long Commune is situated as follows:

- To the north, it borders Trung Ngãi.
- To the east, it borders Nhị Long.
- To the south, it borders An Trường.
- To the west, it borders Hiếu Phụng and Hiếu Thành.

Càng Long Commune covers an area of 46.87 km²; as of 2024, it has a population of 41,542 people, resulting in a population density of approximately 886 people/km².

== Administration ==
Càng Long Commune is divided into 25 hamlets: 1, 2, 3, 4, 5, 6, 7, 8, 9, 10, Bờ Lộ Mới, Chợ, Dừa Đỏ, Dừa Đỏ 2, Dừa Đỏ 3, Đùng Đình, Gò Cà, Hiệp Phú, Mây Tức, Mỹ Huê, Mỹ Long, Mỹ Trường, Sơn Trắng, Thái Bình, and Thạnh Hiệp.

== History ==
On October 3, 1996, the Government issued Decree No. 57/1996/ND-CP regarding the establishment of Cang Long Township, based on the adjustment of a portion of the land area and population of My Cam Commune.

On June 16, 2025, the National Assembly Standing Committee issued Resolution No. 1687/NQ-UBTVQH15 regarding the reorganization of commune-level administrative units in Vĩnh Long Province in 2025. Accordingly, the entire natural land area and population of Cang Long Township, along with My Cam and Nhi Long Phu Communes, were consolidated to form a new commune named Cang Long Commune.

Following the merger, Cang Long Commune comprises a natural land area of 46.87 km² and a population of 41,542 people.

== Transport ==
Some major roads in Càng Long Commune:

- National Route 53
- 3/2 Road
- 19/5 Road
- 30/4 Road
- 2/9 Road
- Đồng Khởi Road
- Nguyễn Đáng Road
- Phạm Thái Bường Road
- Hương lộ 31.
