= Tam Bình district =

Coordinates: 10.083°N 105.917°E

Tam Bình district Huyện Tam Bình
- District
- Interactive map of Tam Bình district
- Country: Vietnam
- Region: Mekong Delta
- Province: Vĩnh Long
- Capital: Tam Bình

Area
  - Total: 110 sq mi (280 km^{2})

Population (2003)
  - Total: 162,191
  - Density: 1,500/sq mi (580/km^{2})
- Time zone: UTC+7 (UTC + 7)

Tam Bình is a rural district of Vĩnh Long province, in the Mekong Delta region of Vietnam. As of 2003, the district had a population of . The district covers an area of 280 km^{2} (110 sq mi). The district capital lies at Tam Bình.
