= Châu Thành district, Trà Vinh =

Châu Thành district Huyện Châu Thành
- District
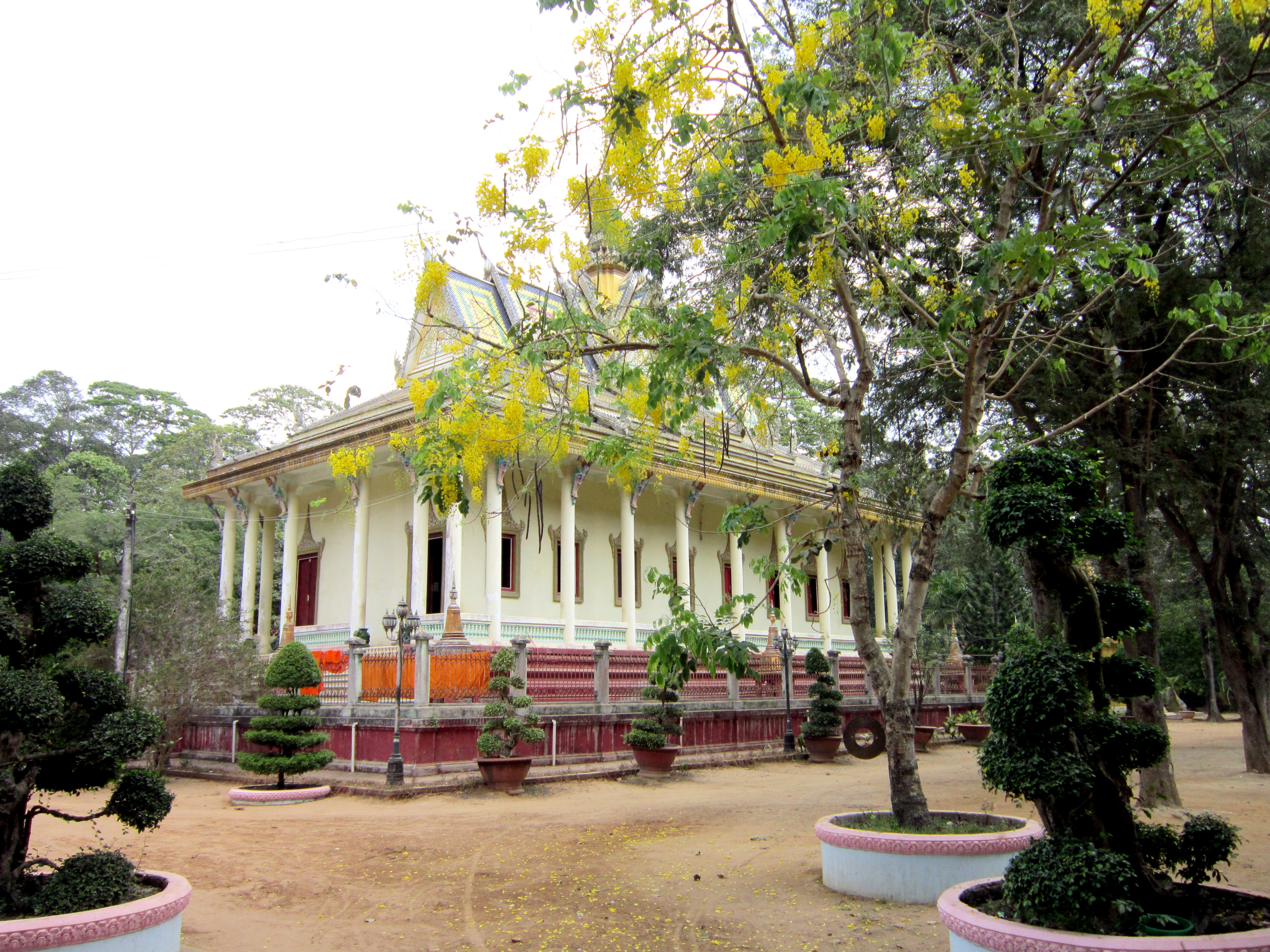
- Hang Pagoda (Chùa Hang). It means "Cave Temple"
- Interactive map of Châu Thành district
- Country: Vietnam
- Region: Mekong Delta
- Province: Trà Vinh
- Capital: Châu Thành

Area
  - Total: 131 sq mi (339 km^{2})

Population (2017)
  - Total: 148,000
- Time zone: UTC+7 (UTC + 7)

Châu Thành is a rural district (huyện) of Trà Vinh province in the Mekong Delta region of Vietnam. As of 2003, the district had a population of 140,438. The district covers an area of 339 km^{2} (131 sq mi). The district capital lies at Châu Thành.
