= Vũng Liêm district =

Coordinates: 10.083°N 106.167°E

Vũng Liêm district Huyện Vũng Liêm
- District
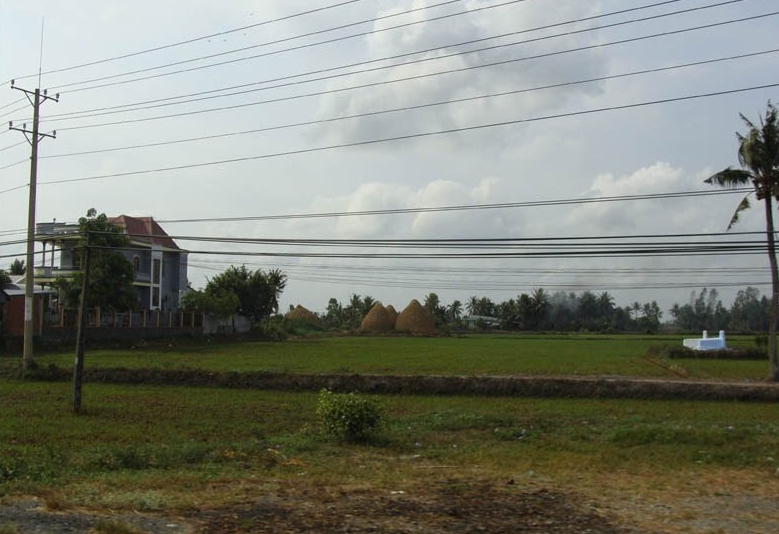
- View of the countryside in Vũng Liêm

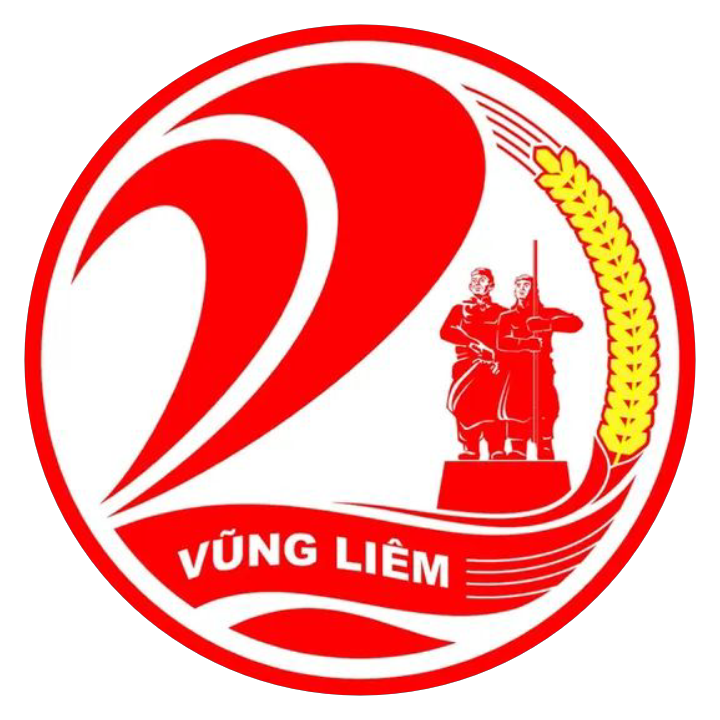
- Seal
- Interactive map of Vũng Liêm district
- Country: Vietnam
- Region: Mekong Delta
- Province: Vĩnh Long Province
- Capital: Vũng Liêm

Area
  - Total: 114 sq mi (294 km^{2})

Population (2003)
  - Total: 176,233
  - Density: 1,550/sq mi (599/km^{2})
- Time zone: UTC+7 (UTC + 7)

Vũng Liêm is a rural district (huyện) of Vĩnh Long province, in the Mekong Delta region of Vietnam. As of 2003 the district had a population of 176,233. The district covers an area of 294 km^{2} (114 sq mi). The district capital lies at Vũng Liêm.
