= Cầu Kè district =

Coordinates: 9.867°N 106.083°E

Cầu Kè district Huyện Cầu Kè
- District
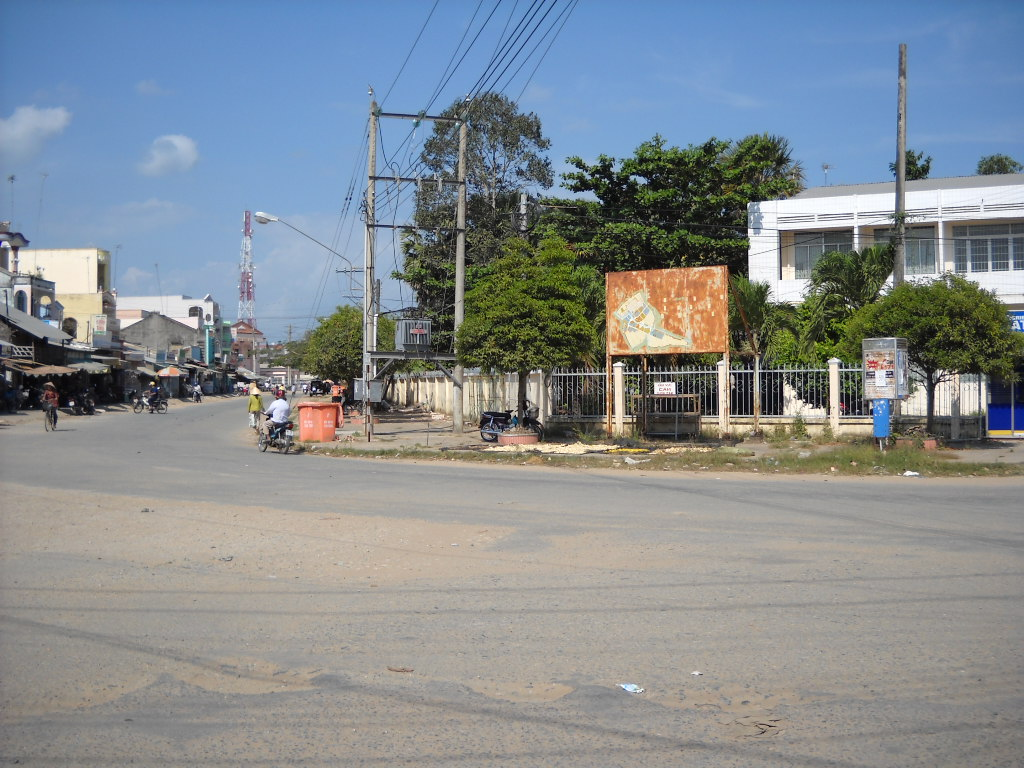
- Street in Cầu Kè town
- Interactive map of Cầu Kè district
- Country: Vietnam
- Region: Mekong Delta
- Province: Vĩnh Long
- Capital: Cầu Kè

Area
  - Total: 90 sq mi (234 km^{2})

Population (2003)
  - Total: 128,555
- Time zone: UTC+7 (UTC + 7)

Cầu Kè is a rural district (huyện) of Trà Vinh province in the Mekong Delta region of Vietnam. As of 2003 the district had a population of 128,555. The district covers an area of 234 km^{2} (90 sq mi). The district capital lies at Cầu Kè.
