= List of Buddhist temples in Hanoi =

Buddhist temples in Hanoi include:

| Name | Other name | Address | District/County | Notes | Image |
|---|---|---|---|---|---|
| Anh Linh Temple | | Cổ Nhuế commune | Từ Liêm | Founded by Princess Trần Khắc Hãn, by order of her father Emperor Trần Nhân Tông. Classified as ahistoric and artistic monument since 1993. | |
| Bà Đanh Temple | | Thụy Khuê street | Ba Đình | Founded on the south bank of the Hồ Tây Lake, it was authorized by Emperor Lê Thánh Tông as a meditation centre and temple for the benefits of the Cham people. | |
| Bà Đá Temple | Linh Quang tự | 3 Nhà Thờ street | Hoàn Kiếm District | Constructed in the 11th century under the reign of Emperor Lý Thánh Tông. According to tradition, excavations in the 15th century under Emperor Lê Thánh Tông, uncovered a statue in stone in the shape of a woman which was subsequently put to veneration, with the temple being renamed Bà Đá (lady in stone). Former centre of the Lâm Tế tông Zen school, it is now the office for the Civic Buddhist Association of Hanoi. | |
| Bà Già Temple | | Phú Gia village | Tây Hồ | Houses the statues of two sisters, who sold salt for a living and helped and donated funds to renovate an old crumbling temple that existed on that site. After their deaths, the thankful local people erected their statues for veneration. | |
| Bà Nành Temple | Tiên Phúc tự | 154 Nguyễn Khuyến street | Đống Đa | Founded in the 13th century under the Lý dynasty. Related to the romantic legend of Emperor Lê Thánh Tông meeting here and exchanging with a young fairy, who disappeared as suddenly as she first appeared. The same legend applies to the neighbouring Bà Ngô Temple. Classified as an architectural and artistic monument since December 1986. | |
| Bà Ngô Temple | Ngọc Hồ tự | 128 Nguyễn Khuyến street | Đống Đa | Constructed in the 12th century during the reign of Emperor Lý Nhân Tông. Related to the romantic legend of Emperor Lê Thánh Tông meeting here and exchanging with a young fairy, who disappeared as suddenly as she first appeared. The same legend applies to the neighbouring Bà Nành Temple. Classified as a historic and cultural monument since 1993. | |
| Bà Tấm Temple | Sùng Phúc tự, Sùng Khánh tự | Sóc village, Dương Xá commune | Gia Lâm | Veneration of Empress Mother Ỷ Lan of the Lý dynasty. | |
| Báo Ân Temple | | East bank of Gươm Lake, today the site of the Hanoi post office | Hoàn Kiếm | Constructed in 1842, the temple was destroyed by the French in 1888 for the building of the Hanoi post office. Only the Hòa Phong tower in the backyard remains. | |
| Báo Thiên Temple | Sùng Khánh Báo Thiên tự | 40 Nhà Chung street | Hoàn Kiếm | Moved by the French in the 19th century, to the present day district of Hai Bà Trưng, and renamed Chân Tiên Temple. The only remains in the location of origin are an ancient stone well. | |
| Bát Tháp Temple | Bát Tháp tự, Vạn Bảo Temple | Vạn Phúc area, Đội Cấn street | Ba Đình | Merged with Núi Voi Temple on the Voi Phục summit, mount Vạn Bảo. Emperor Lý Huệ Tông retired here to become a monk. Classified as architectural and artistic monument since 1989. | |
| Bồ Đề Temple | Thiên Sơn tự | Phú Viên village, Bồ Đề commune | Long Biên | Constructed in 1427, on the land of Lê Lợi's Bồ Đề palace, during the time his forces were surrounding Đông Quan (Hanoi back then). | |
| Bồ Tát Temple | Bảo Tháp tự, Bồ Đề Temple, Thượng Phúc tự | Thượng Phúc village, Tả Thanh Oai commune | Thanh Trì | Constructed during the Trần dynasty, on the banks of the Nhuệ river. Empress Dowager Minh Từ resided here during the reign of Emperor Trần Hiến Tông. Classified as a historic and cultural monument since September 1990. | |
| Bộc Temple | Sùng Phúc Tự, Thiên Phúc Tự | On the site of the 1789 Battle of Đống Đa | Đống Đa | Burnt down during the 1789 Battle of Đống Đa where the Tây Sơn led by Nguyễn Huệ defeated the invader Qing forces, the temple was reconstructed 3 years later. It was dedicated to the veneration of not just Buddha, but also of Nguyễn Huệ as Emperor Quang Trung dead suddenly in 1792, as well as the soul of the fallen combatants from both sides, including Qing general Sầm Nghi Đống who committed suicide after defeat. After becoming Emperor Gia Long and taking over the entire country in 1802, Nguyễn Ánh, a descendant of the Nguyễn lords previously persecuted by Quang Trung, took a nasty revenge on the Tây Sơn military, siblings and even the relics of Quang Trung and his brothers. The statue of Quang Trung venerated at Bộc Temple had to be disguised into another deity to avoid destruction. Classified as national historic and cultural monument since 1962. | |
| Chân Tiên Temple | | Bà Triệu street | Hai Bà Trưng | Was formerly Báo Thiên Temple in the Tiên Thị village. When in the 19th century the French requested that land to build St. Joseph's Cathedral, they moved the temple to the present location. The temple was then renamed Chân Tiên after its village of origin. | |
| Châu Long Temple | | 44 Châu Long street, Trúc Bạch ward | Ba Đình | During the Trần dynasty, Princess Khiết Cô became a Buddhist nun here. The temple was renovated in 1808, 1901 and 1932, and classified as architectural and artistic monument since February 1994. | |
| Cổ Loa Temple | Bảo Sơn tự | Cổ Loa commune | Đông Anh | Has 5 steles dating back to the seventeenth-19th centuries, 2 copper bells from 1803, a khánh copper bell, a copper censer. Classified as national historic and cultural monument since 1993. | |
| Đậu Temple | Thành Đạo tự, Pháp Vũ tự | Gia Phúc village, Nguyễn Trãi commune | Thường Tín | Founded in the 11th century during the Lý dynasty. Veneration of the Buddhist goddess Pháp Vân. The temple houses the statues of two monks who resided here in the 17th century, Vũ Khắc Minh and Vũ Khắc Trường, whose bodies were mummified and enveloped in a combination of paint, fabric, dó paper, sawdust and clay. In 1993, the National Museum of Vietnamese History authenticated by X-rays the content of the statues. | |
| Hà Temple | Thánh Đức tự | Cầu Giấy street | Cầu Giấy | Damaged many times during its history, the temple benefited from a major renovation in 1680, during the reign of Emperor Lê Hy Tông. Two families native of the Thổ Hà village (Bắc Giang Province), came here to sell ceramic products on the markets around Thăng Long (Hanoi back then). Their business being successful, they made a major donation resulting in the renovation in 1680. In gratitude, the temple was renamed Bối Hà, or simply Hà. The Dịch Vọng village where Hà Temple was situated and the Thổ Hà village then joined their destiny together, and on special occasions they send delegations to each other for the religious celebrations. Houses a Khánh Tự bell 1m30 high, cast in 1799 during the Tây Sơn dynasty. Classified as historic and cultural monument since 1996. | |
| Hoè Nhai Temple | | Hòe Nhai street, near Quán Thánh street | Ba Đình | Founded during the Lý dynasty, the temple used to occupy a larger area which shrank sometime during the French Indochina period. A stele erected here in 1703, notes the proximity of the temple to the site of the 1258 Battle of Đông Bộ Đầu when the Trần forces defeated the invader Yuan and drove them out of the Thăng Long capital (Hanoi back then). | |
| Hưng Ký Temple | Hưng Võ thiền am | Minh Khai street | Hai Bà Trưng | Founded in 1931 by Mr. Hưng Ký, a native of Saigon, in what was previously Hoàng Mai village the birthplace of his wife. | |
| Hương Temple | | Hương Sơn commune | Mỹ Đức | | |
| Keo Temple | Trùng Nghiêm tự | Keo village, Kim Sơn commune | Gia Lâm | Keo designates Buddhist goddess Pháp Vân who is venerated here. Her statue, dating from the 18th century, is similar to but smaller than the one in Dâu Temple (Bắc Ninh Province). The temple has also 47 statues of Buddha. Classified as historic and cultural monument since 1993. | |
| Kiến Sơ Temple | | Phù Đổng commune | Gia Lâm | Monk Vô Ngôn Thông coming from China was recognized as his master by resident monk Cảm Thành, and founded Zen school Vô Ngôn Thông in 820. Young Lý Công Uẩn came here to learn the teachings of Buddha. When Zen school Vô Ngôn Thông faded out after a number of generations, the temple turned to the practice of Buddhism, Taoism and Confucianism altogether. Classified as national historic monument since 1975. | |
| Kim Liên Temple | Đại Bi tự Kim Liên | Quảng An ward | Tây Hồ | Emperor Lý Thần Tông in the 12th century authorized the construction on this site of a palace for the benefit of Princess Từ Hoa and her ladies, where they could plant mulberries, breed silkworms and weave silk. After the Princess died, the palace was transformed into a Buddhist temple. Renovated several times subsequently, it was enlarged and acquired its present setting under Emperor Quang Trung. Three buildings are arranged in parallel following the Chinese character 三 (three), the inferior and intermediate temples facing west and the superior temple facing east. In a 1989 publication, the Central Organism for Culture and Arts considered Kim Liên Temple as one of the 10 monuments with the most special historic architecture in Vietnam. | |
| Kim Sơn Temple | Am Vạn Linh, Am Vạn Lịch, Tàu Mã Temple, Kim Mã Temple | At the corner of the streets of Sơn Tây, Kim Mã, Giang Văn Minh | Ba Đình | On this site, previously a cemetery then a court of justice to judge criminals, the people of Mã Trại village constructed during the Lý dynasty a small temple named Am Vạn Linh dedicated to the soul of the deceased. In 1881, a storm destroyed it. The people reconstructed it, installed a Buddha statue, and named it Tàu Mã Temple. In 1898, it was renovated and renamed to Kim Mã. | |
| Láng Temple | Chiêu Thiền tự | Láng Thượng ward | Đống Đa | Emperor Lý Nhân Tông being unable to have a son, adopted the sons of his younger brother Sùng Hiền hầu. Nephew Lý Dương Hoán was born right after the death of monk Từ Đạo Hạnh, one of the most important figures of the Lý dynasty, and therefore believed to be the monk's incarnation. Selected as the crown prince, he became Emperor Lý Thần Tông in 1127 on the death of his uncle Lý Nhân Tông. He then dies in 1138 and was succeeded by his oldest son Lý Anh Tông. It was Lý Anh Tông who had Láng Temple constructed, in order to venerate his father and his soul ancestor monk Từ Đạo Hạnh (also venerated at Thầy Temple). | |
| Liên Phái | Liên Hoa, Liên Tông | Liên Phái alley | Hai Bà Trưng | According to the tradition, Trịnh Thập, son-in-law of Emperor Lê Hy Tông, uncovered a lotus while excavating on this site. Believing this is a message from Buddha, he constructed a temple and entered a monastic life here. A stele sculpted in 1857 states that the temple was founded in 1726. | |
| Lý Quốc Sư Temple | Đền Lý Quốc Sư | 50 Lý Quốc Sư street | Hoàn Kiếm | Constructed in 1131, the temple was dedicated to Nguyễn Minh Không, father of the copper casting craft believed to possess magical skills. After having cured Emperor Lý Thần Tông, he was highly considered by the Imperial Court and obtained the highest ranking title of Lý Quốc Sư (national master of the Lý dynasty). Damaged during the Indochina War, the temple was renovated and became a Buddhist temple after 1954. Classified as a historic and cultural monument since 1995. | |
| Một Cột Temple | Diên Hựu tự, Liên Hoa Đài | In the vicinity of the Ho Chi Minh Mausoleum | Ba Đình | Designed to resemble a lotus blossom. Regarded alongside the Perfume Pagoda as one of Vietnam's two most iconic temples. | |
| Nành Temple | Pháp Vân tự | Ninh Hiệp commune | Gia Lâm | Veneration of Pháp Vân, goddess of the clouds, one of the four Buddhist goddesses of Vietnam (the other three being Pháp Vũ goddess of rain, Pháp Lôi goddess of thunder, Pháp Điện goddess of lightning; collectively called Tứ pháp, they were deities for the agricultural activities venerated well before the introduction of Buddhism into Vietnam, and became Buddhist goddesses thereafter; their cult is practised in a number of temples in northern Vietnam, and has not spread to the centre and the south). Classified as national architectural and artistic monument since 1989. | |
| Nga My Temple | | Hoàng Mai street, Hoàng Văn Thụ ward | Hai Bà Trưng | A stele indicates the temple was constructed after Emperor Lý Thái Tổ moved the capital from Hoa Lư (Ninh Bình Province) to Thăng Long (Hanoi). Classified as historic architectural and artistic monument since 1994. | |
| Ngũ Xá Temple | Thần Quang tự | 44 Ngũ Xã street, Trúc Bạch Lake | Ba Đình | Constructed in the 18th century for the veneration of Buddha and Lý Quốc Sư Nguyễn Minh Không, father of the copper casting craft believed to possess magical skills. The temple houses a statue of Amitābha Buddha, 3.95m in height, 11.6m in circumference, weighing 10 tons, with a 96 petals lotus blossom as the base, weighing 1.6 ton; the largest copper statue at that time. | |
| Pháp Hoa Temple | | Trần Bình Trọng street, Nguyễn Du ward | Hai Bà Trưng | In 1860, the people of Pháp Hoa village all contributed financially to the construction of the temple. Classified as scenic monument since 1989. Part of a group with the three neighbouring temples of Thiền Quang, Quang Hoa and Pháp Hoa. | |
| Quán Sứ Temple | | 73 Quán Sứ street | Hoàn Kiếm | Headquarters of the Buddhist Sangha of Vietnam. | |
| Quang Hoa Temple | | Trần Bình Trọng street, Nguyễn Du ward | Hai Bà Trưng | Classified as scenic monument since 1989. Forms a group with the three neighbouring temples of Thiền Quang, Quang Hoa and Pháp Hoa. | |
| Sãi Temple | Tĩnh Lâu tự | Bưởi ward | Tây Hồ | Founded during the Lý dynasty on a scenic site along the banks of the West Lake, the temple houses over 40 statues of Buddha in various sizes, including one of Amitābha Buddha 1.34m high, as well as a bell cast in 1799. Classified as historic and cultural monument since June 1996. | |
| Sét Temple | Đại Bi tự | Giáp Lục village, Tân Mai ward | Hai Bà Trưng | Founded in 1630 by lady Đặng Thị Ngọc Dao, wife of Trịnh Tùng reputed to be the first generation of the Trịnh lords. The temple houses a statue of Ngọc Dao and her tomb. | |
| Sủi Temple | Phú Thị tự, Đại Dương tự, Sùng Phúc tự | Phú Thụy commune | Gia Lâm | In 1066, Empress Mother Ỷ Lan came here to pray and seek fertility. She gave birth later to Prince Càn Đức. Classified as architectural and artistic monument since January 1989. | |
| Tảo Sách Temple | Linh Sơn tự | Xuân La ward | Tây Hồ | Classified as historic and cultural monument. | |
| Thanh Am Temple | Đông Linh tự | Thanh Am village, Thượng Thanh commune | Gia Lâm | Thanh Am village was founded by Nguyễn Bỉnh Khiêm who settled here with his siblings and fellow villagers, naming it Hoàng Am at first. Under the official reign of Emperor Lê Hiển Tông, but the actual rule of the Trịnh lords, Trịnh Doanh repressed a series of rebellions starting in 1740. After peace returned to the region in 1744, the people of the village who went through that trouble period unharmed, constructed Thanh Am Temple in gratitude. The temple has a bell cast in 1793. | |
| Thiên Niên Temple | | Xuân La ward | Tây Hồ | According to the tradition, the temple was founded in the 6th century during the reign of Emperor Lý Nam Đế. It is dedicated to the veneration of Buddha and of Lady Phạm Thị Ngọc Đô, concubine of Emperor Lê Thánh Tông and queen of the silk weaving craft, who transmitted her skills to the local people. | |
| Thiền Quang Temple | | Trần Bình Trọng street, Nguyễn Du ward | Hai Bà Trưng | Classified as a scenic monument since 1989. Forms a group with the three neighbouring temples of Thiền Quang, Quang Hoa and Pháp Hoa. | |
| Trấn Quốc Temple | Khai Quốc; An Quốc | Thanh Niên street, Hồ Tây | Tây Hồ | The oldest Buddhist temple of Hanoi, constructed in the 6th century during the reign of Emperor Lý Nam Đế. | |
| Tự Khoát Temple | Hưng Phúc tự | Tự Khoát village, Ngũ Hiệp commune | Thanh Trì | Founded by two princesses of the Lý dynasty, who entered a monastic life after the temple was built. Classified as a historic and cultural monument since 1988. | |
| Tứ Liên Temple | Tam Bảo Temple | Tứ Liên ward | Tây Hồ | Constructed in 1631 during the reign of Emperor Lê Thần Tông. Classified as national historic and cultural monument. | |
| Ức Niên Temple | | Xuân La ward | Tây Hồ | | |
| Vạn Niên Temple | Vạn Tuế Temple | Vệ Hồ village, Xuân La ward | Tây Hồ | Founded in 1014 during the Lý dynasty. A number of famous monks have resided here, such as Lâm Tuệ Sinh, Lý Thảo Đường, Biện Tài a native of Guangzhou. | |
| Võng Thị Temple | Vinh Khánh tự | 75 Võng Thị street, Bưởi ward | Tây Hồ | Constructed during the Lý dynasty. Houses a wooden statue of Buddha dating back to the Mạc dynasty. Classified as national historic and cultural monument. | |
| Vua Temple | | Phố Huế ward | Hai Bà Trưng | One of the Lê dynasty princes had a temple constructed on this site, dedicated to Đế Thích, king of Chinese chess. That temple is adjacent to the Buddhist Temple of Hưng Khánh, which the prince used as the centre for Chinese chess playing in Thăng Long (Hanoi back then). Among the 14 wooden statues remaining, sticks out the 1.6m high statue of Đế Thích. For hundreds of years until today, a tournament of Chinese chess takes place here from the 6th to the 9th day of the Vietnamese calendar first month. In the 1930s during the Indochina War, resistance activist Nguyễn Phong Sắc used the temple as the base for his underground activities. For that reason, the temple was classified revolutionary resistance war monument since October 2004. | |
| Vũ Thạch Temple | | 13b Bà Triệu street | Hoàn Kiếm | Named after its village of origin. Classified as architectural and artistic monument since 1986. | |
