= Nguyễn Văn Tồn =

Vietnamese general

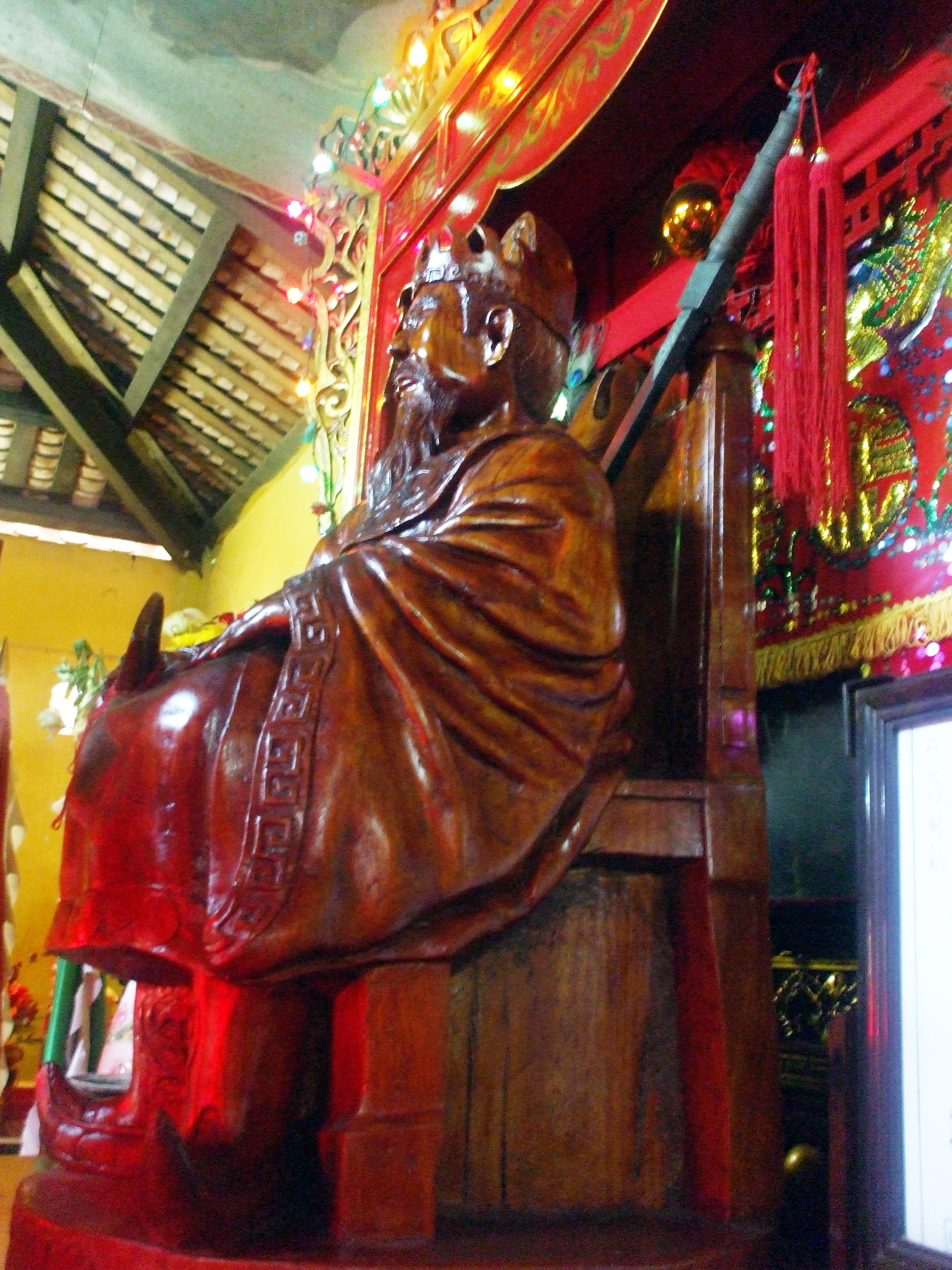
Nguyễn Văn Tồn

Thống chế Điều bát Nguyễn Văn Tồn (chữ Hán: 統制調撥 阮文存, 1763–1820) was a general and official of the Nguyễn dynasty of Vietnam.

He was a Khmer Krom. He was either born in Càng Long or in Trà Ôn, Cần Thơ Province (in present-day Vĩnh Long Province). His Khmer name was Duồn or Duông. At first he was a slave. He followed Nguyễn Ánh to Bangkok in 1784, in there he was promoted to cai đội and took the Vietnamese name Nguyễn Văn Tồn. He followed Nguyễn Ánh back to Southern Vietnam in 1787. He gathered an army of several thousand Khmers in Trà Vinh and Mân Thít (present-day Mang Thít), called the Xiêm binh đồn (暹兵屯, lit. "Siamese soldiers' camp"), to reinforce Nguyễn Ánh.

Tồn joined the battle of Quy Nhơn in 1801. He was captured by Tây Sơn rebels. He was appreciated by Tây Sơn generals and joined the rebels. He did fight bravely for them, however, not long after he escaped and joined the Nguyễn army again. He was promoted to cai cơ in the next year and sent to Trà Vinh and Mân Thít.

Siamese invaded Cambodia in 1811. Nguyễn Văn Tồn and Nguyễn Văn Thoại were sent to help him. They defeated Siamese army in Longvek. Nguyễn Văn Tồn was left in Phnom Penh to "protect" the Cambodian king Ang Chan. He was promoted to thống chế (統制), and received the title Dung Ngọc hầu (lit. Marquess Dung Ngọc) from Nguyễn dynasty.

Nguyễn Văn Tồn was appointed Điều bát nhung vụ in 1819. He was sent to Châu Đốc to dig the Vĩnh Tế Canal. He died in the next year. Emperor Minh Mạng mourned his death; the emperor compared him with Jin Midi, a prominent official of the Chinese Han dynasty of Xiongnu ethnicity.

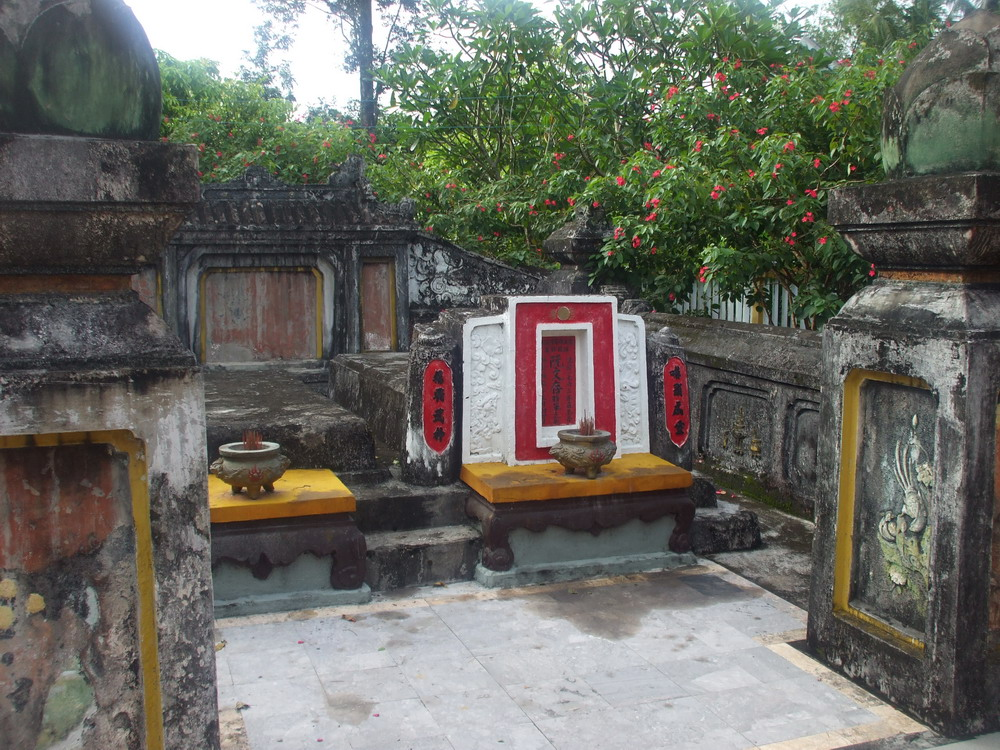
Tomb of Nguyễn Văn Tồn and his wife

His tomb was in present-day Trà Ôn District, Vĩnh Long Province. The tomb was called Lăng ông Tiền quân Thống chế Điều bát by local people.
