= Thích Thanh Từ =

Vietnamese Zen Buddhist monk (born 1924)

- Title: Deputy Dharma Chairman

Personal life
- Born: Trần Hữu Phước; 24 July 1924 (age 101) Tích Khánh Hamlet, Thiện Mỹ Commune, Trà Ôn District, Vĩnh Long Province, Vietnam

Religious life
- Religion: Buddhism
- School: Trúc Lâm Zen
- Sect: Thiền (Zen)

Senior posting
- Predecessor: Thích Phổ Tuệ Thích Trí Quảng

Thích Thanh Từ (born 24 July 1924) is a Vietnamese Thiền Buddhist monk. He has been influential with increasing traditional Vietnamese Buddhism practices within the country.

== Biography ==
Thích Thanh Từ began his life in a well-educated family that followed Cao Đài, a Vietnamese religion founded in 1926. He was born on July 24, 1924, in Cần Thơ, Vietnam with the birth name of Trần Hữu Phước. He was determined to become a Buddhist monk after noticing the suffering of his people during wartime and after 3 months of Buddhist duties and at the age of 25 was given his Buddhist name which he is now known by, Thích Thanh Từ. After 3 years of servicing as an expression of gratitude towards his master he finally decided to leave, seeking "unlearned knowledge" to find his true self. Feeling that Pure Land practice would not help him attain this goal, he secluded himself in a meditation chamber that he built in 1966 to take up the practice of meditation. After several unsuccessful attempts at various meditation methods, he eventually discovered the concept of Nothingness. Realizing how powerful meditation can be, he wanted to engage with the public and teach the Buddhist ways, living by the phrase "After realization, enlighten others."

== Teachings ==
Thích Thanh Từ began his teachings in December 1971 with only 10 students and involved scriptures, discourses, history and meditation methods. His focus is to be aware of any false thoughts, but prevent from attaching to them. Three years later opened three new monasteries which included Linh Quang, Chân Không, Bát Nhã monasteries. From the initial 10 students he taught, he went on to teach thousands of other monks and nuns to pass on his dharma teachings. He also founded Thường Chiếu monastery (1974) in Long Thành which became the headquarters of his organization in 1986. Thích Thanh Từ discovered meditation to help improve the common practice of Vietnamese Thiền in Vietnam, mainly at the site of the Trúc Lâm school. His practice methods are constructed from 3 important keys in historical Chán from China, which consists of patriarch Huệ Khả, Huệ Năng, and Trúc Lâm Đầu Đà. He put together their enlightened ideas and practice which they now practice in his monasteries’. He refers to the "Transmission of the Lamp" as one of the main objectives of distributing his teachings among his students of the Trúc Lâm philosophies. He talks about lighting 10 to 20 torches which will then light 30 to 40 torches in order to light up the whole world.

== Trúc Lâm ==
=== History ===
Trúc Lâm was founded in and around the time of Trần Nhân Tông (1258–1308) who was a former king of Vietnam. The first Trúc Lâm Temple was on top of Yên Tử Mountain where Nhan Tong retired to. This was the only school of Thiền that was founded in Vietnam instead of originating from China. The Trúc Lâm sect grew enormously with the help of the next 2 patriarchs, Pháp Loa and Huyền Quang. Once they came to the end of their time, the school successfully came to an end. After many attempts to revive the school, Thích Thanh Từ is the most recent and becoming the most successful monk to restore Trúc Lâm. He built a monastery in Yên Tử Mountain to re-connect the meaning of Trúc Lâm to its origin, and while using this name, is able to strengthen the impact of his movement. Although it can be argued that what he had created was not original Trúc Lâm Buddhism but still had a positive effect on the reform of Buddhism on the global level.

=== Thích Thanh Từ's influence ===
His efforts are brought forth from the principles of 3 patriarchs whom he believes have very minimal amounts of transition from traditional Chinese Buddhism. Thích Thanh Từ claims to be re-establishing the Trúc Lâm traditions but in his own way has modified it from its original ways. He wasn't much of a global influence in his earlier years of work, but in recent history has been on top of Buddhist movements on the global level. His initial work in Vietnam has now moved onwards to western civilization by getting his word across through the translation of books that he has written. He is having the most influence on today's view on Buddhism and what it means to be a Buddhist monk through the implementation of the revived religion referred to as Trúc Lâm.

== Writings ==
Thích Thanh Từ started writing in 1961 and in over 45 years has written over 50 books.

- My Whole Life
- The Source of Buddhist Dharmas
- The Carefree Leaves
- If You Know
- Buddhism and the Youths
- The Practicing Method of Vietnamese Zen

== Sources ==
- Philip Taylor, Modernity and Re-enchantment: Religion in Post-revolutionary Vietnam (Maryland, US, 2008)
