= Thích Phước Ngọc =

Buddhist monk

Thích Phước Ngọc or Thich Phuoc Ngoc
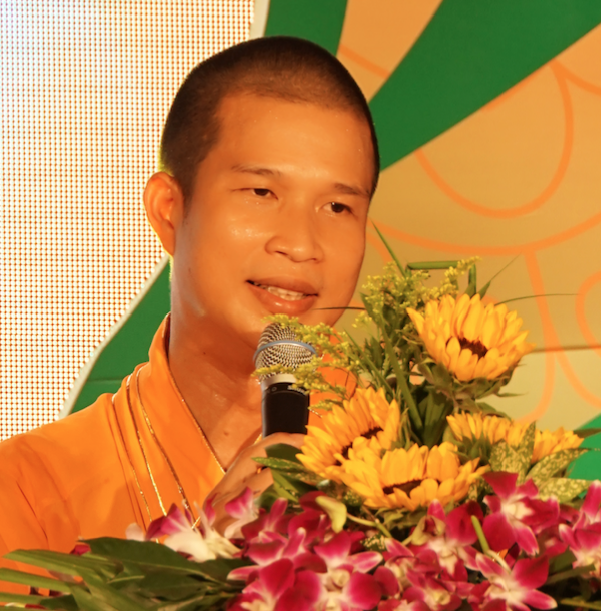
- Title: Đại Đức (Venerable)

Personal life
- Born: Phạm Văn Cung; February 28, 1982 (age 44) Thiện Mỹ Commune, Trà Ôn District, Vĩnh Long Province
- Known for: humanitarian and social security activities
- Other name: Dhammananda Thero
- Occupation: • President of Children Development Center ISURU SEVANA, Sri Lanka • International Envoy at Sri Lankan Government’s Buddhist Commendation Committee • Member of the Central Committee for Communication and Education of the Vietnam Buddhist Sangha • Abbot of Phước Quang Pagoda - Office of the Buddhist Administration Committee of Tam Bình District, Vĩnh Long Province • Founder and Director of Buddhist Orphanage Center “The Source of love”, Vĩnh Long Province.
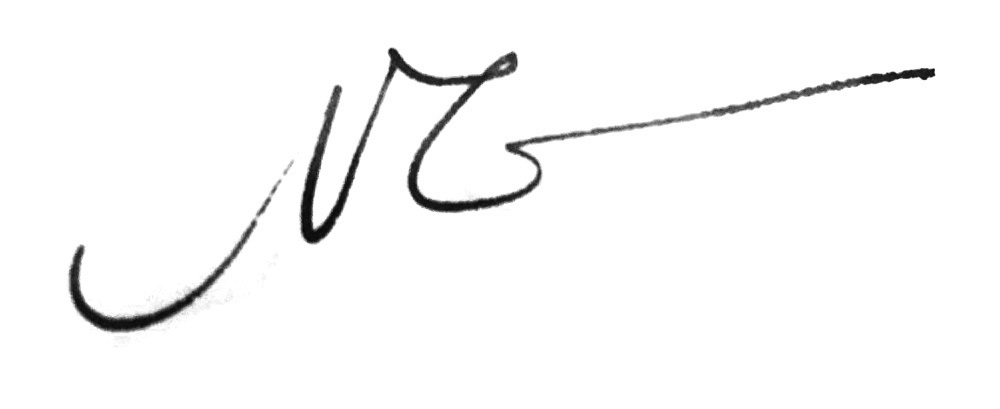
- Signature

Religious life
- Religion: Therevada Buddhism (Southern Buddhism)
- Temple: Phước Quang Pagoda
- School: Tổ Đình Phước Hậu, Vĩnh Long Province

Senior posting
- Teacher: Thích Lưu Đoan
- Website: https://www.suoinguontinhthuong.vn/ https://www.youtube.com/user/khoale1000

Thich Phuoc Ngoc or Dhammananda Thero Thich Phuoc Ngoc - a Buddhist monk (born February 28, 1982, in Vietnam) is a Venerable of Sri Lanka Buddhist Sangha. He has been known for positive contributions to humanitarian and social security activities, is the founder of the first Buddhist orphanage in Vietnam.

He is also a poet with collections of poems about Buddhism. In the process of abbot, he built religious constructions which set Vietnam and World records at Phước Quang pagoda and the Orphanage Center “the Source of Love”.

On November 25, 2020, the investigating security agency of Vinh Long Provincial Police issued a decision to prosecute and temporarily detain Pham Van Cung to investigate the act of "fraud to appropriate property".

== Identity and career ==
Thich Phuoc Ngoc (name: Pham Van Cung) was born in Mỹ Hưng Village, Thiện Mỹ Commune, Trà Ôn District, Vĩnh Long Province (Southwest, Vietnam).

He became a monk in 1993 at Phước Hậu Temple (Vĩnh Long), a disciple of the late Venerable Thich Luu Doan and was given the Buddhist name Thich Phuoc Ngoc (释 福 玉), Phap Lac (法 樂).

From 2000 to 2005, after completing the school and program of Buddhist studies in Vietnam, Thich Phuoc Ngoc studied and practiced Buddhism in Sweden, Denmark and the United Kingdom.

Since 2006, he returned to Vietnam. Thich Phuoc Ngoc was appointed by the Buddhist Sangha of Vietnam as the abbot of Phước Quang Pagoda (the predecessor of this temple was the Buddhist Institute of Khanh Hue and the Bodhi Khanh Anh Primary School, founded by the late Venerable Thich Thien Hoa. founded in 1953).

In 2007, he was chosen by the Central Administrative Council of the Buddhist Sangha of Vietnam to be a member of the Central Committee for Buddhist Communication and Education.

At the end of 2007, he submitted a project to establish Buddhist Orphanage Center “The Source of Love”- a social charity institution for orphans, disabled and disadvantaged people. On September 19, 2008, the Chairman of Vinh Long Provincial People's Committee approved the project and issued a decision to permit the establishment in accordance with 1780 / QD-UBND, named him as Director, who is responsible for the construction and management.

On November 2, 2012, the Buddhist Orphanage Center “The source of love” was launched and put into operation.

On November 14, 2016, The International Union of Red Cross presented him with an honorary medal recognizing his contributions and influence on Humanitarian health issues worldwide.

On January 24, 2017, Chairman of Vinh Long People's Committee issued Decision No. 171 / QD-UBND on the dissolution of The Buddhist orphanage center "The Source of Love" to become a part under Phước Quang pagoda, as the request from the Director of the Buddhist orphanage center and Official Letter No. 65 / SLĐTBXH-BTXH date January 20, 2017, of the Director of Department of Labor - Invalids and Social Affairs submitted to the PPC..

Since 2019, he has been a Member of the Development Council for the global Vietnamese record organization (VietWorld), and the Head of Foreign Affairs of the Vietnam Record Institute Council.

From September 20, 2019, he has been an International Envoy to the Sri Lankan Government's Buddhist Commendation Committee, with the title Master Dhammananda Thero, according to the decision of the Ministry of Education of the Government of the Democratic Republic of Sri Lanka.

In early 2020, Dhammananda Thich Phuoc Ngoc was nominated by the Executive Committee of the Sri Lankan Isuru Sevana Children's Center to assume the position of chair of the Isuru Sevana Center under the Decision dated February 16, 2020, of the Ministry of Child Care of the Government Cabinet. Sri Lanka appointed.

On September 23, 2020, some newspapers cited Document No. 349 / HDTS-VP2 of the Executive Committee of the Buddhist Sangha of Vietnam and said that he was disciplined, secularized, and deleted his monk's name from the Buddhist Sangha of Vietnam by the Central Executive Committee of the Buddhist Sangha of Vietnam – Office 2, because of received "a number of denunciations against Pham Van Cung (ie Venerable Thich Phuoc Ngoc) forcing, defrauding a large amount of money". After three days, on September 25, 2020, the Central Executive Committee – Office 2 issued a document in which of contents confirmed the announcement on September 23, 2020, did not accuse Thich Phuoc Ngoc (Pham Van Cung) to violate the law, and he did not secularized because of disciplined decision.

On November 6, 2020, at the National Organ Transplant Coordination Center, Venerable Dhammananda Thich Phuoc Ngoc registered to donate organ/ tissue after his death, with the wish "to live is to give and to die is for all. All we have are useful to life and human".

On November 25, 2020, the investigating security agency of Vinh Long Provincial Police issued a decision to prosecute and temporarily detain Pham Van Cung to investigate the act of "fraud to appropriate property".

== Comment ==
Venerable Thich Thien Nhon - Vice president and general secretary of the Central Committee of the Vietnam Buddhist Sangha, said about Venerable Thich Phuoc Ngoc, printed in the opening of the poem entitled "Love forever", Ho Chi Minh City General Publishing House, March 2010:

Life is about being aware of the facts, but with a little love, everything becomes more comprehensive and more beautiful. This makes me admire when I read the poem of Venerable Thich Phuoc Ngoc, a young monk, but talented, has clearly penetrated the meaning of living human love

== Proverbs action ==
The Justice one uses the Evil Method, the Evil Method is the justice. The Evil One uses the Justice Method, the Justice is the Evil.

Your task is not to judge or punish. Karma will take care of it. Your duty is love. (Article in People's Newspaper - Central Agency of the Communist Party of Vietnam, Voice of the Party, State and People of Vietnam)

== Books ==
- Con đường tôi đi (The way I go) - Publication license: 494-09 / CXB / 27-76 / THTPHCM, 88m.
- Tình người muôn thuở (Forever love) - Publication permit: 206-10 / CXB / 45-09 / THTPHCM, 120m.
- Bần tăng thi tập (Poems of a monk) - Publishing permits: 174-12 / CXB / 63-21 / THTPHCM, 220m.

== Reward ==
- Decision No. 799 / QD-TTg, dated 11 May 2016 of the Prime Minister of the Socialist Republic of Vietnam, on “Having achievements in charitable social work, contributing to building socialism, developing and protecting fartheland”;
- Decision No. 1204 / QD-LDTBXH, dated September 6, 2012, of the Minister of Labor, Invalids and Social Affairs on “Having outstanding achievements in charitable social activities, period from 2008 to 2012”;
- The International Union Red Cross in the UK on November 14, 2016, on the contribution to the positive change of human issues: environment, peace, humane...
- Decision No. 167 / QD-BQP, dated January 18, 2017, of the Minister of Defense of Vietnam for “Outstanding achievements in the care of military families, contributing to the building and defending the Fatherland".
- Decision No. 860 / QD-CTN dated May 19, 2017, of the President of the Socialist Republic of Vietnam, awarded the Third-class Labor Medal for "Outstanding achievements in charitable social work", contributing to the building socialism and defending the Fatherland".
- Decision No. 1888 / QD - MTTW dated February 2, 2018, of the Central Committee of the Vietnam Fatherland Front, awarding a certificate of merit to Venerable Thich Phuoc Ngoc, abbot of Phước Quang Pagoda, Tam Bình District, Vĩnh Long Province, Member of the Central Communication and Education Department of Vietnam Buddhist Sangha for outstanding achievements in implementing the 2017 Social Security Program.
