= One Pillar Pagoda =

Buddhist temple in Hanoi, Vietnam

- Vietnamese: Chùa Một Cột
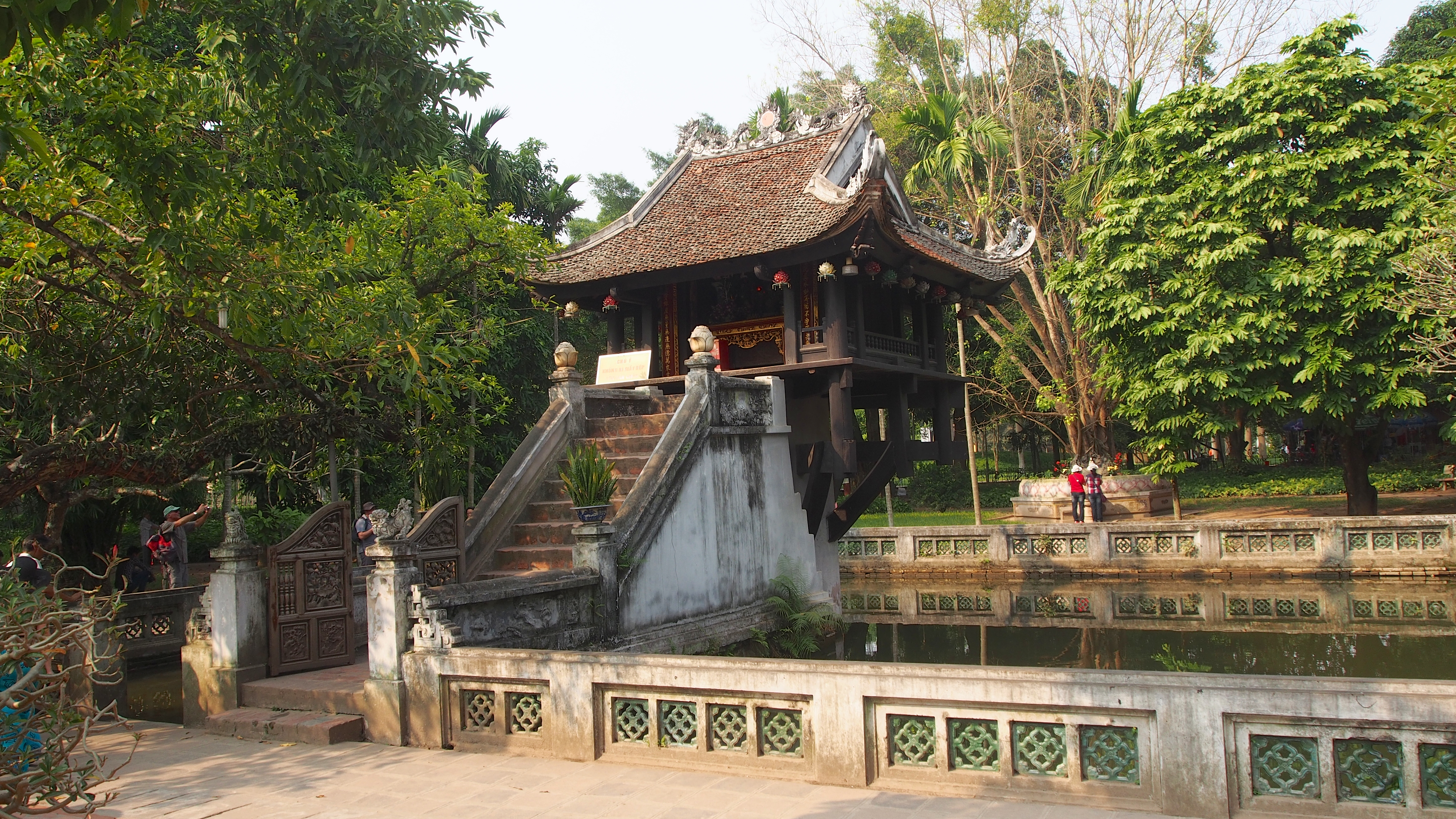
- One Pillar Pagoda

Religion
- Affiliation: Buddhism
- District: Ba Đình
- Province: Hanoi

Location
- Country: Vietnam
- Interactive map of One Pillar Pagoda
- Coordinates: 21°02′08.99″N 105°50′01.04″E

Architecture
- Completed: 1049

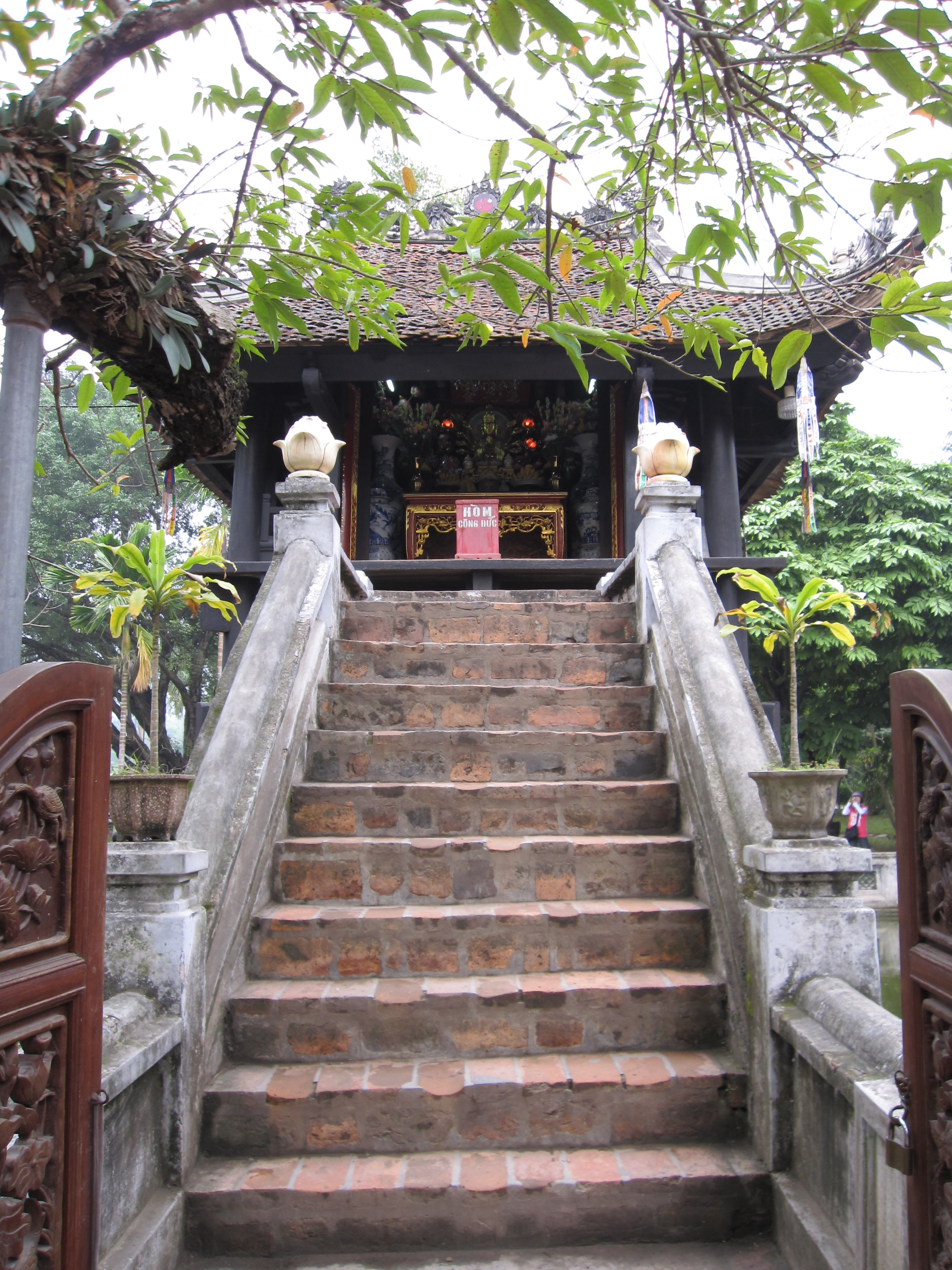
Steps leading up to the pagoda

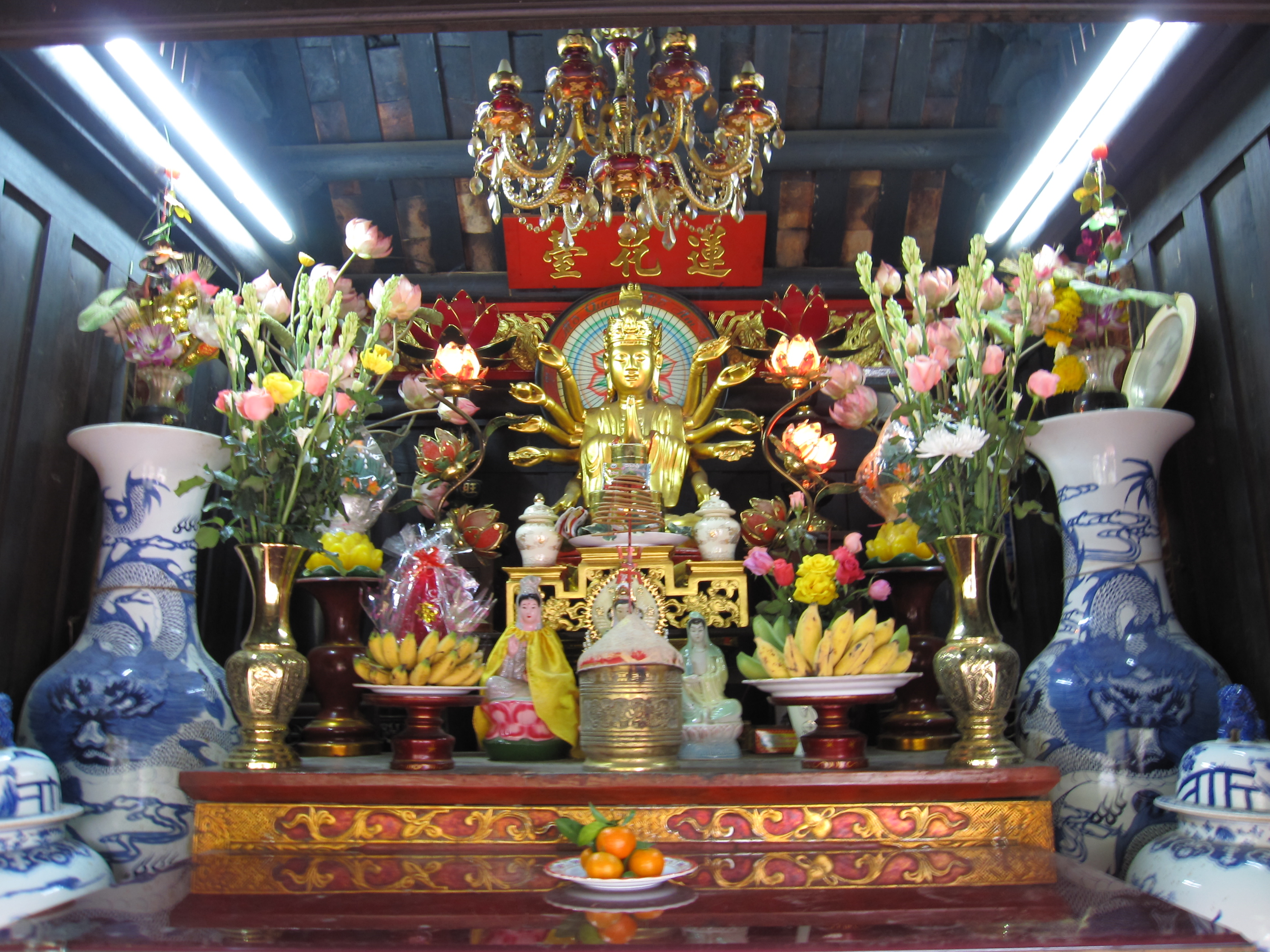
Small shrine devoted to Quan Âm Boddhisatva inside the pagoda

The One Pillar Pagoda (Vietnamese: Chùa Một Cột; chữ Nôm: 廚𠬠榾), formally belongs to an architecture complex called Diên Hựu tự ( chữ Hán: 延祐寺) which means 'pagoda of extended blessings'. The pagoda is a historic Buddhist temple in the central Ba Đình district (near the Thăng Long Citadel), Hanoi, the capital of Vietnam. The most famous part of this architecture complex is Liên Hoa Đài (蓮花臺) means 'the lotus pedestal' which is a temple with special structure: a building laid on one pillar. The original pagoda was built in 1049, had some additions and was perfected in 1105. It is regarded alongside the Hương Temple, as one of Vietnam's two most iconic temples.

== History ==
=== Lý dynasty ===
The temple was built by Emperor Lý Thái Tông, who ruled from 1028 to 1054. According to the court records, Lý Thái Tông was childless and dreamt that he met the Bodhisattva Avalokiteśvara, who handed him a baby son while seated on a lotus flower. Lý Thái Tông then married a peasant girl he had met; the couple had a son. The emperor constructed the temple in gratitude for this in 1049, having been told by a monk named Thiền Tuệ to build the temple, by erecting a pillar in the middle of a lotus pond, similar to the one he saw in the dream.

The temple was located in what was then the Tây Cấm Garden in Thạch Bảo, Vĩnh Thuận district in the capital Thăng Long (now known as Hanoi). Before the pagoda was opened, prayers were held for the longevity of the monarch. During the Lý dynasty era, the temple was the site of an annual royal ceremony on the occasion of Vesak, the birthday of Gautama Buddha. A Buddha-bathing ceremony was held annually by the monarch, and it attracted monks and laymen alike to the ceremony. The monarch would then free a bird, which was followed by the people.

The temple was renovated in 1105 by Emperor Lý Nhân Tông and a bell was cast and an installation was attempted in 1109. However, the bell, which was regarded as one of the four major capital works of Vietnam at the time, was much too large and heavy, and could not be installed. Since it could not be tolled while left on the ground, it was moved into the countryside and deposited in farmland adjacent to Nhất Trụ Temple. This land was widely inhabited by turtles, so the bell came to be known as Chuông Quy Điền ( 鍾龜田), which means bell of the turtles' field. At the start of the 15th century, Vietnam was invaded and occupied by the Ming dynasty. In 1426, the future Emperor Lê Lợi attacked and dispersed the Chinese forces, and while the Ming were in retreat and low on weapons, their commanding general ordered that the bell be smelted, so that the copper could be used for manufacturing weaponry.

=== After Lý dynasty ===
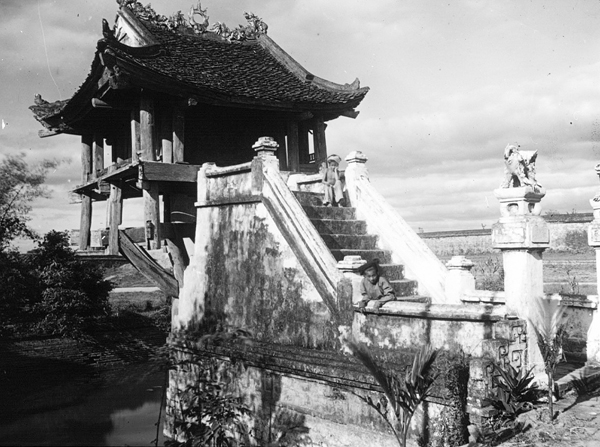
One Pillar Pagoda in 1896

During Nguyễn dynasty, the pagoda was restored and rebuilt in 1840-1850 and 1922.

The pagoda was dynamited in 1954. Contrary to what is commonly written, it was not destroyed by the French, but by a Vietnamese Lieutenant of the French Army who was severely punished. In 1955, Ministry of Culture of Democratic Republic of Vietnam restored the pagoda and the Lotus Station based on the architectural style that Nguyễn dynasty had left.

== Architecture ==
=== Original architecture ===
There were some additions and be perfected in 1105 according to Đại Việt sử ký toàn thư:

"Ất Dậu (乙酉) - the fifth year, (1105 AD), Song Chongning the fourth year. [...] At that time, the emperor (Lý Thánh Tông) ordered the restoration of Diên Hựu pagoda to be more beautiful than before, dug Liên Hoa Đài lake (Lotus Station's lake), called Linh Chiểu lake. Outside the lake, there was a corridor running around, outside the corridor dug another lake called Bích Trì Lake, built bridges to cross. In front of the temple yard built a stupa."

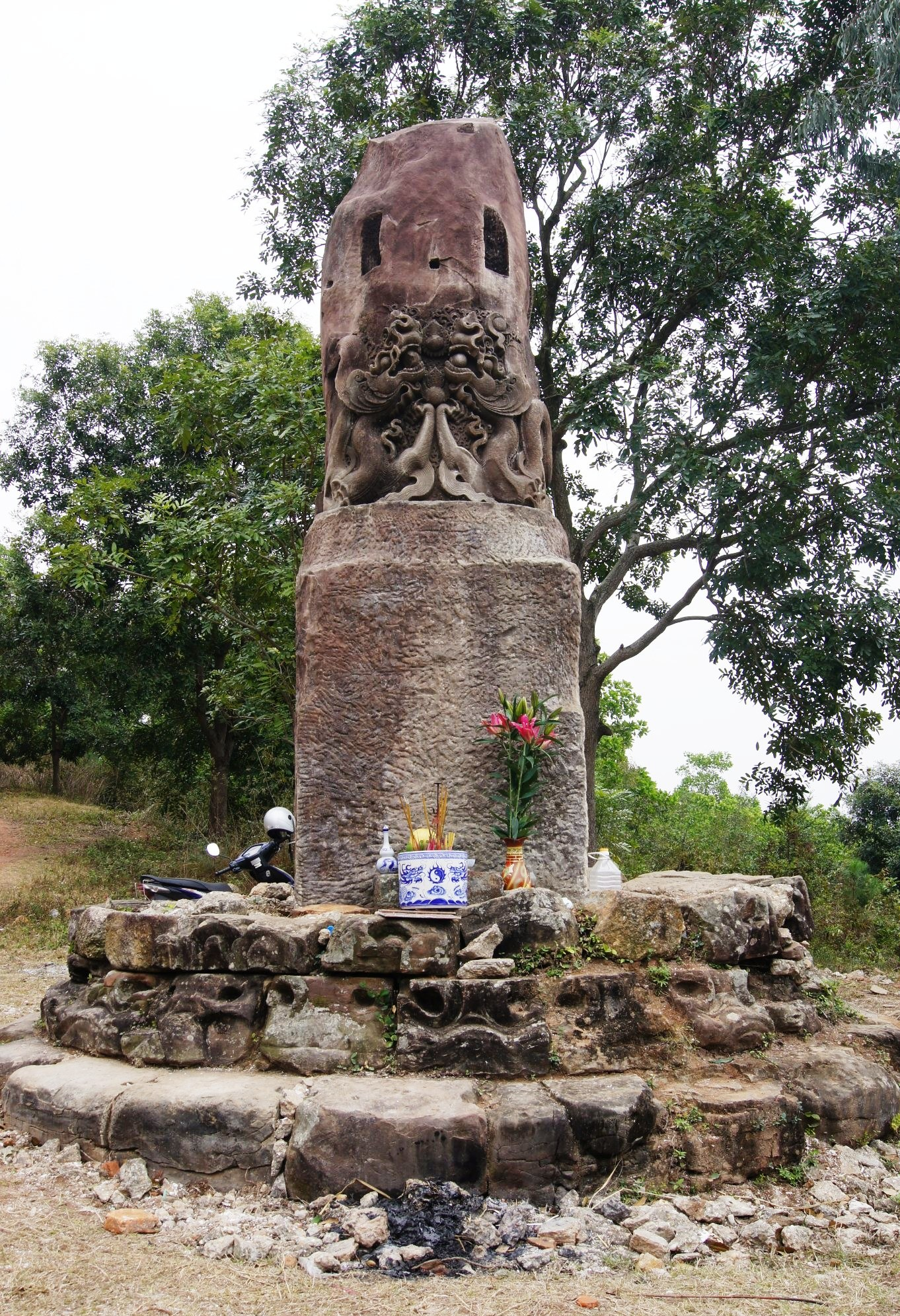
The ruin Stone pillar of Dạm Pagoda: a similar structure to the pillar of Liên Hoa Đài (Lotus Station - One Pillar Pagoda)

In the 1999 research paper, the folk culture researcher Nguyễn Hùng Vĩ gave evidence to prove: the One Pillar Pagoda's architecture is similar to the ruin stone pillar of Dạm Pagoda. According to Dr. Trần Trọng Dương, the original architecture of Diên Hựu Pagoda is a geometric configuration of symbols of Buddhism called Mandala.

According to the research results in more than 20 years, on October 10, 2020, the group of researchers, architects and painters - SEN Heritage held a seminar to propose a plan to re-establish the original architecture of Diên Hựu pagoda based on the Lý dynasty's architectural style. The centre of the structure complex is Liên Hoa Đài (Lotus Station - One Pillar pagoda) with the structure of an hexagonal on one pillar lotus flowers building. The group used 3D images and virtual reality to present their research result. The seminar was attended by experts such as the historian Dương Trung Quốc, researcher Nguyễn Hùng Vĩ, Dr. Trần Trọng Dương, and the press.

=== Building restoration in 1955 ===
The temple is built of wood on a single stone pillar 1.25 meters in diameter and 4 meters in height, and it is designed to resemble a lotus blossom, which is a Buddhist symbol of purity, since a lotus blossoms in a muddy pond. In 1954, the French Union forces destroyed the pagoda before withdrawing from Vietnam after the First Indochina War. It was rebuilt afterwards.

A replica was built in Downtown Thủ Đức, Province of Gia Định, suburb of Saigon (now is in Ho Chi Minh City) in the late 1950s and early 1960s.

== See also ==
- List of Buddhist temples in Hanoi
