= Quán Sứ Pagoda =

Coordinates: 21.0245°N 105.8453°E

- Vietnamese: Chùa Quán Sứ
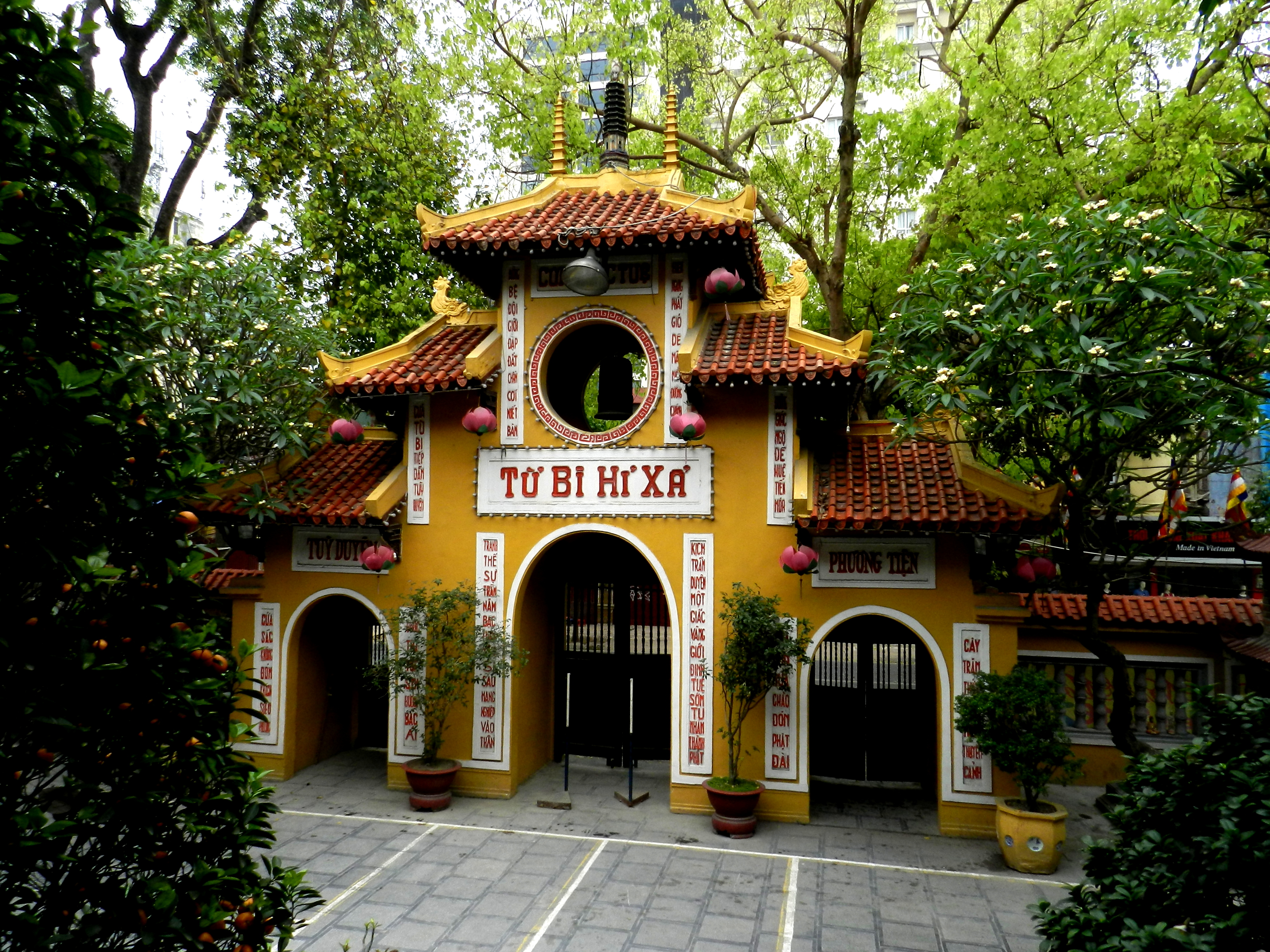
- Tam quan of Quán Sứ Pagoda

Religion
- Affiliation: Buddhism
- District: Hoàn Kiếm
- Province: Hanoi
- Deity: Gautama Buddha

Location
- Country: Vietnam
- Interactive map of Quán Sứ Pagoda

Architecture
- Completed: 15th century

Quán Sứ Pagoda (Vietnamese: Chùa Quán Sứ, chữ Hán: 舘使寺) is a Buddhist temple located at 73 Quan Su Street, Hanoi, Vietnam. The temple is the headquarters of the Buddhist Sangha of Vietnam.

== History ==
Quan Su Pagoda was built in the 15th century under the Lê dynasty. At that time there was no Buddhist temple here but some cottages used as a place of worship. According to Hoàng Lê nhất thống chí, during Emperor Le The Tong's reign, Chiem Thanh (Champa), Ai Lao (Laos) usually sent ambassadors to offer tributes to Đại Việt (official name of Viet Nam under the Lê dynasty). The Emperor ordered to construct a building called Quan Su (Embassy) to receive foreign ambassadors to Thăng Long. Because those ambassadors were all Buddhist, they decided to build a temple on the premises for worship. Today only the temple remains.

According to Doctor Le Duy Trung's essay carved on the 1855 stele, the temple was close to Hau Quan Base in the early years of Gia Long Era (1802–1819). In 1822, the temple was renovated so that the local residents could practise worship here. When the troops withdrew, the temple was returned to the villagers. Monk Thanh Phuong, who hosted the temple then, had corridors built, statues painted, bell made. The front palace is dedicated to the Buddha and the rear palace is dedicated to Master Minh Khong of the Lý dynasty.

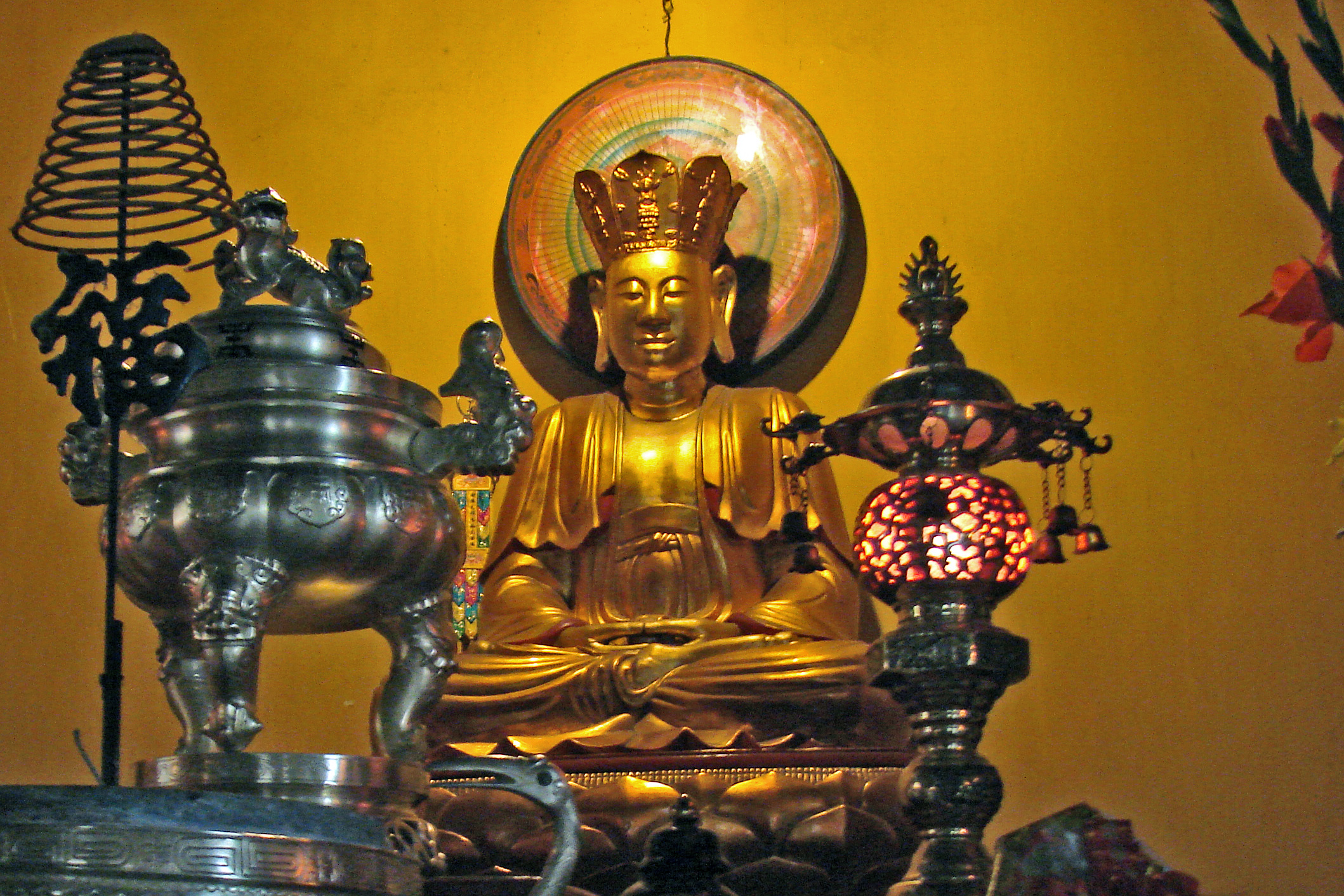
Altar in the temple

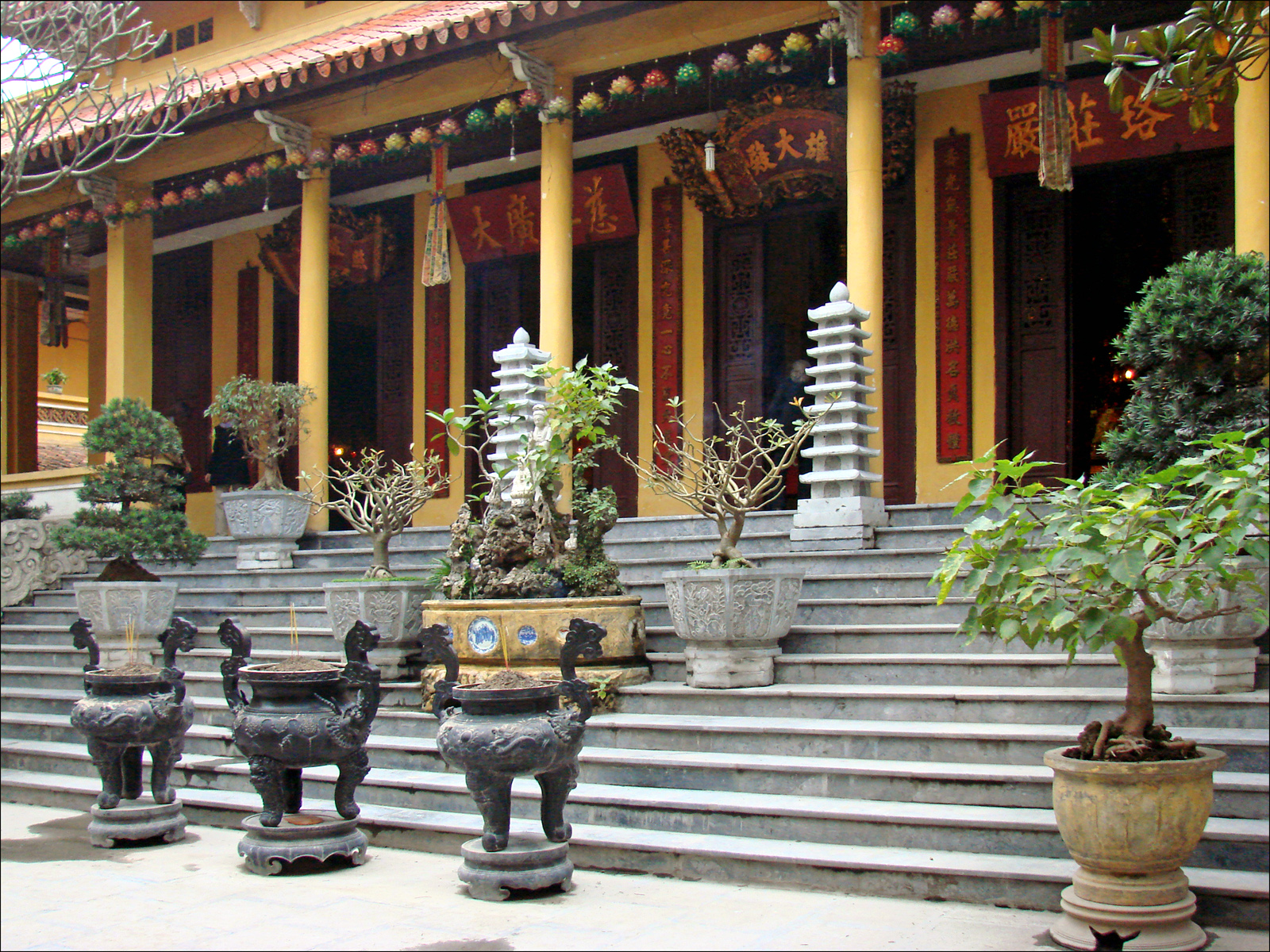
Entry to the main temple

== See also ==
- List of Buddhist temples in Hanoi
- Buddhist temples in Hanoi
