= Thích Phổ Tuệ =

Vietnamese Buddhist monk (1917–2021)

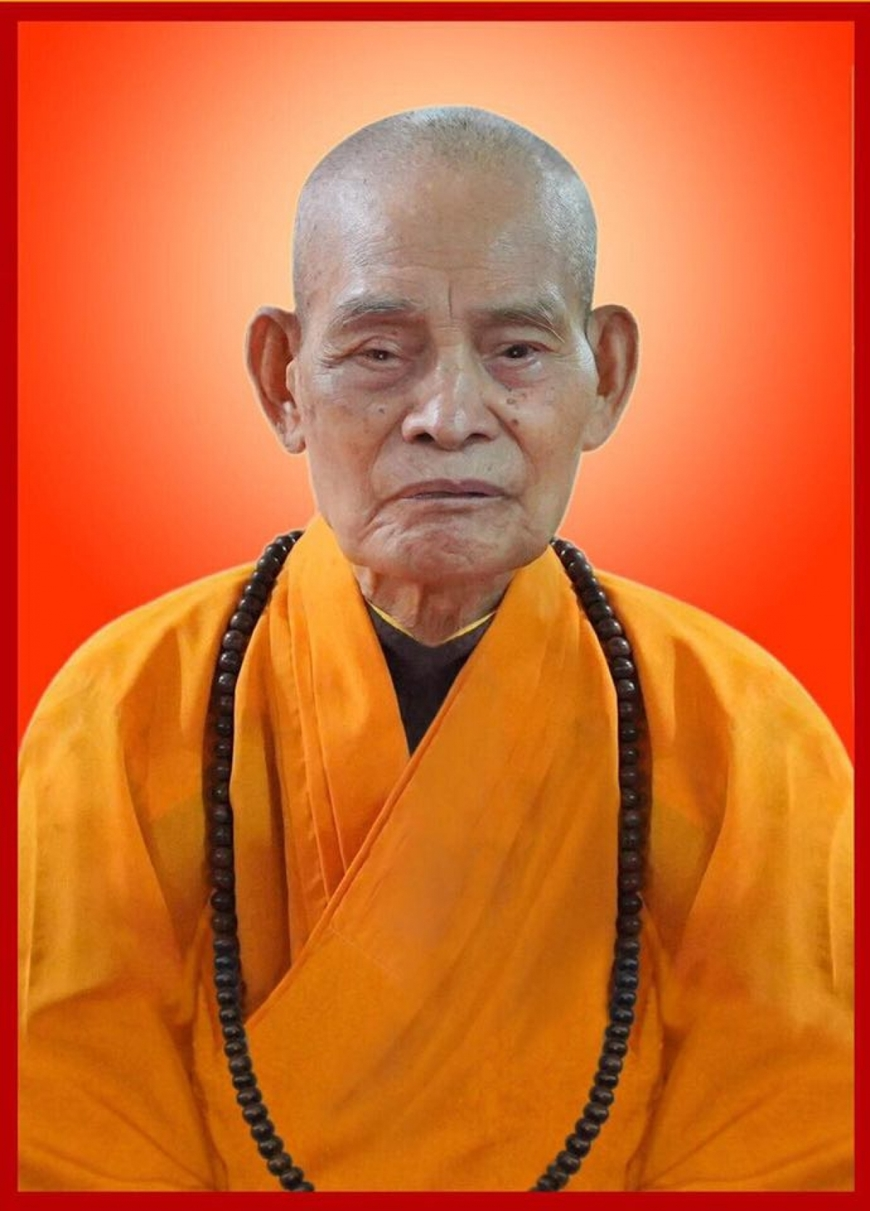
- Third Supreme Patriarch Thích Phổ Tuệ

Personal life
- Born: Bùi Văn Chước; April 12, 1917 Yên Khánh District, Ninh Bình Province, Vietnam
- Died: October 21, 2021 (aged 104) Phú Xuyên District, Hanoi, Vietnam

Religious life
- Religion: Buddhism
- School: Lâm Tế Tông
- Dharma name: Phổ Tuệ (普慧)

Thích Phổ Tuệ (April 12, 1917 – October 21, 2021) was a Vietnamese Buddhist monk. In 2007 until his death, he held the position of Supreme Patriarch for the Buddhist Sangha of Vietnam.

== Early life ==
His hometown was Khanh Tien commune, Yen Khanh district, Ninh Binh province. He was ordained at the age of 5.

== Works ==
Thích translated various works throughout his life, including; Phật Tổ tam kinh (Three Sutras of the Buddhas and Ancestors), Bát-nhã dư âm, and Đề cương kinh Pháp hoa.
