= Phan Thi Bich Hang =

Vietnamese psychic

- Born: February 15, 1972 (age 54); Yen Khanh Ninh Binh Province, Vietnam
- Occupations: Psychic Expert, Vegan restaurant chain manager (Việt Chay), Spiritual activist, Anti-abortion advocate

Phan Thi Bich Hang is a famous, purported psychic in Vietnam. She claims to be able to see and talk directly with spirits of the dead. She also claims to have the ability to see remains buried underground. Recent investigations suggest that she may be involved in fraud.

== Biography ==
Phan Thi Bich Hang was born on February 15, 1972, in Ninh Binh Province, Vietnam. Bich Hang is a graduate of the University of National Economics and later she got a degree in Business Administration (MBA). Since 1999, Bich Hang has been working as a lecturer at the Hanoi University of Business and Technology. Phan Thi Bich Hang is one of the professional staff at the Psychological Department, Research Center for Human Potential, Union of Science and Technology of Vietnam. In early 2005, she started doing a business specializing in interior design. Then she and her like-minded friends launched a vegetarian restaurant chain in Hanoi in order to create jobs for some students. All the profit collected from the business is transferred to her own charity named Tam Vang (Golden Mind). Besides other activities, this charitable fund mainly helps victims of Agent Orange and financially supports heart surgeries for newborn babies.

== The process of becoming psychic ==
Bich Hang claims to have become a psychic after a major incident. The story begins when she and her girlfriend were bitten by a rabid dog in 1988. Her friend could not sustain the injury and died. Bich Hang's family took her to many Oriental and Western physicians and healers to treat the disease, but in vain. Bich Hang claims to have died, and awoken with a plethora of psychic abilities allegedly proven through finding buried bones and other acts. She is famous for her purported abilities in Vietnam. Ms. Hang claims to have found the remains of tens of thousands of martyrs including those she claims come from historic figures such as the writer Nam Cao, Nguyen Phong Sac, Ho Ngoc Lan, Nguyen Duc Canh. Ms. Hang also claimed to find ancient graves that had been lost for a long time such as the grave of military leader Hoang Cong Chat (1739–1769).

== Accusations of Fraud ==
More recently, investigations have suggested that she has passed off items like animal bones and shards of ceramics as the bodies of the deceased.
