= Wu Yantong =

Vietnamese Zen master (759–826)

Zen Master Vô Ngôn Thông
- 無言通
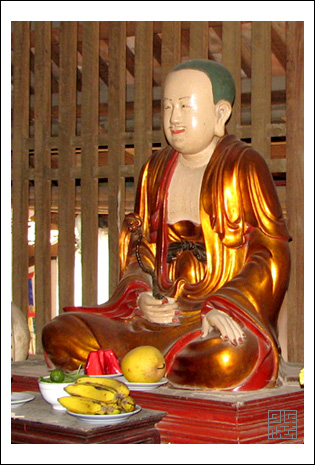
- Statue of Vô Ngôn Thông in Kiến Sơ Temple, Gia Lâm, Hanoi, Vietnam

Personal life
- Born: 759 Guangzhou, China
- Died: 826 Bắc Ninh, Vietnam
- Resting place: Mount Tiên Du

Religious life
- Religion: Buddhism
- Temple: Song Lâm Temple, Vũ Châu
- School: Zen Buddhism

Senior posting
- Teacher: Baizhang Huaihai

Wu Yantong (Chinese: 無言通, known in Vietnam as Vô Ngôn Thông, c. 759–826 C.E.) was a Chinese Buddhist monk influential in the transmission of Chan (Zen) into Vietnam. He founded the Vô Ngôn Thông Zen Sect during the early 9th century.

== Biography ==
Wu Yantong was born in Guangzhou, Tang China, into a wealthy family with the surname Zheng (鄭). He renounced lay life and became a monk at Songlin Temple (雙林寺) in Wuzhou. Though quiet and reserved, he was known for his sharp intellect and was called "Wu Yan Tong" (literally, "No Words Penetration") due to his silent nature. The Jingde Record of the Transmission of the Lamp (景德傳燈錄) refers to him as Bu Yan Tong.

A formative moment in his spiritual journey came when a fellow practitioner asked him during a ritual, "Who is that presiding monk?" He replied, "It is Buddha." The guest then asked, pointing to a Buddha statue, "Then what is this Buddha?"—to which Wu Yantong could not answer. This encounter deeply affected him and led him to seek out the great Zen master Mazu Daoyi, though by the time he arrived, Mazu had died. He then studied under Baizhang Huaihai (Bách Trượng Hoài Hải). Upon hearing Baizhang say, "If the mind is pure and empty, the sun of wisdom will shine by itself" (心地若空，慧日自照), he experienced enlightenment.

== Transmission to Vietnam ==
In 820 C.E., Wu Yantong traveled south to Annam—present-day Vietnam—and took up residence at Kiến Sơ Temple (建初寺) in Phù Đổng village, Bắc Ninh Province. There, he practiced wall-contemplation (bích quán), following the methods of Bodhidharma, the Indian monk who had introduced Zen to China in the 6th century.

For years, he lived in seclusion, meditating silently facing a wall. The local abbot, Cam Thanh, recognized his deep realization and treated him with great reverence. Before his passing in 826, Wu Yantong called Cam Thanh and delivered a final gatha (verse):

一切諸法皆從心生 心無所生法無所住 若達心地所住無礙 非遇上根慎勿輕許	All dharmas arise from the mind The mind has no place to arise, the dharmas have no place to abide If you reach the place where the mind abides without hindrance If you do not encounter superior faculties, do not teach lightly

After reciting the verse, he died peacefully. His disciple Cam Thanh cremated his body and built a stupa on Tiên Du Mountain.

== The Vô Ngôn Thông Zen Sect ==
The sect founded by Wu Yantong emphasized sudden enlightenment and direct realization, continuing the Southern Chan lineage of Huineng (慧能). It maintained the use of wall-contemplation and poetic expression as vehicles for insight. The sect flourished in Vietnam for over 17 generations, shaping Vietnamese Thiền (Zen) Buddhism.

=== Prominent Figures ===
Notable masters of this tradition include:

- Khuông Việt (933–1011)
- Thông Biện (d. 1134)
- Mãn Giác (1052–1096)
- Minh Không (d. 1141), also known as Lý Quốc Sư
- Giác Hải

Though some masters like Không Lộ are sometimes associated with the Vô Ngôn Thông lineage, they also connect to the later Thảo Đường sect.

== Legacy ==
Wu Yantong's teachings laid the groundwork for Vietnamese Zen's independence from Chinese control. His emphasis on self-cultivation and meditative discipline resonated through the Vietnamese Buddhist monastic community and continued to influence subsequent Vietnamese Buddhist schools.

== Sources ==
- Le Manh That: Research on Thien Uyen Tap Anh, Ho Chi Minh City Publishing House 1999.
- Electronic Chinese version of Vien Chieu & Chan Nguyen Zen Monastery. Fellow practitioner Nguyen Huu Vinh (Taiwan) re-read.
