= Trà Ôn =

Trà Ôn Phường Trà Ôn
- Ward
- Trà Ôn ward
- Location within Vietnam
- Coordinates: 9°57′55″N 105°55′28″E
- Country: Vietnam
- Region: Mekong Delta
- Province: Vĩnh Long
- Time zone: UTC+7 (UTC + 7)

Trà Ôn is a ward (phường) of Vĩnh Long Province, Vietnam. Before 2025, the commune was a township (thị trấn) and capital of Trà Ôn District of Vĩnh Long Province, Vietnam.
