= Kiến Sơ Temple =

Buddhist temple in Hanoi, Vietnam

The Kiến Sơ Temple (Vietnamese: chùa Kiến Sơ) is a Buddhist temple in Gia Lâm District of Hanoi, Vietnam. The Chinese monk Vô Ngôn Thông came to reside in the temple around 820 and it became an important base for propagation of Buddhism in Vietnam.
