= Yên Khánh district =

Coordinates: 20.183°N 106.083°E

Yên Khánh district Huyện Yên Khánh
- District
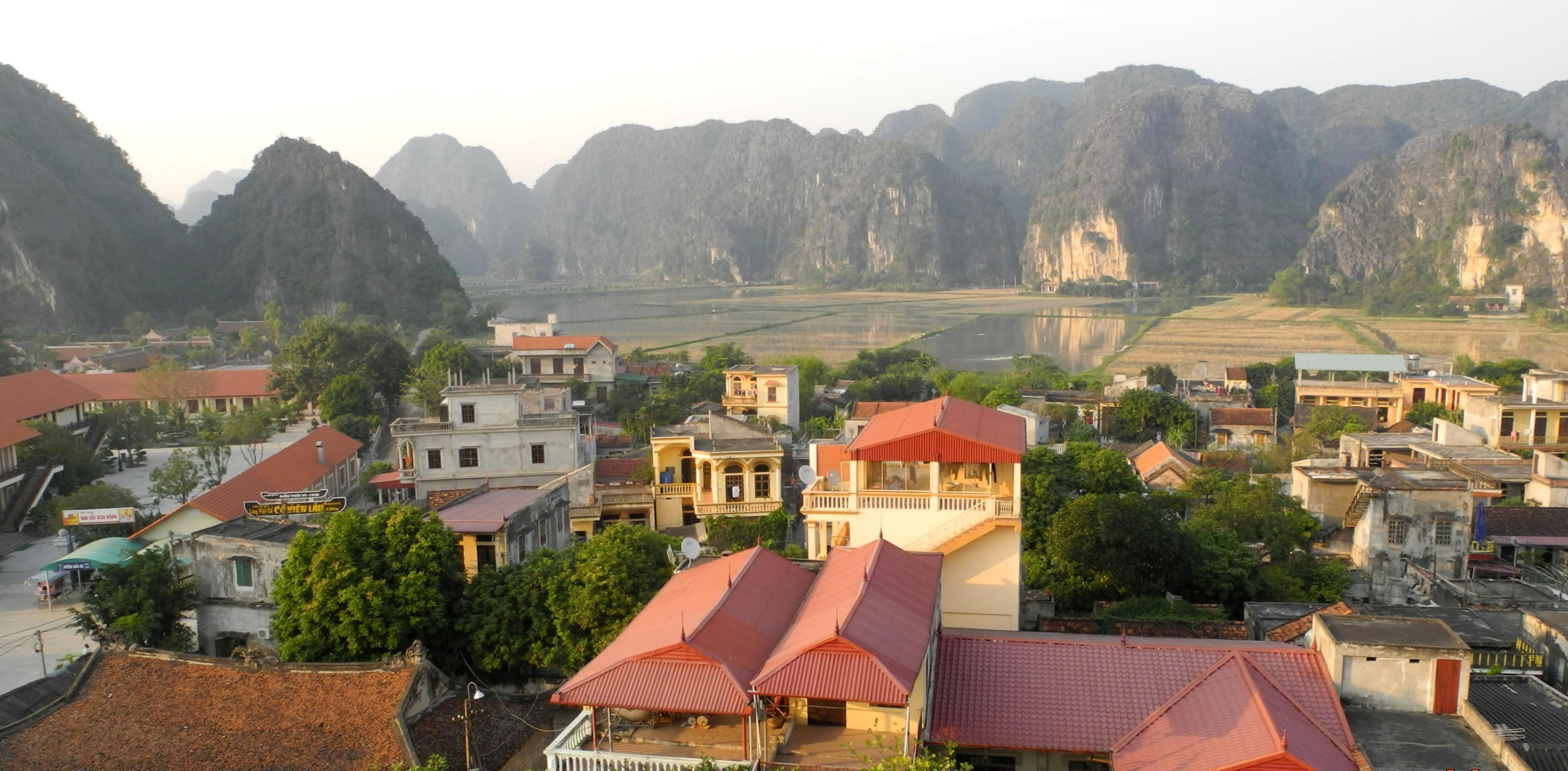
- Overlooking Ninh Bình
- Interactive map of Yên Khánh district
- Country: Vietnam
- Region: Red River Delta
- Province: Ninh Bình
- Capital: Yên Ninh

Area
  - Total: 55 sq mi (142 km^{2})

Population (2003)
  - Total: 141,471
- Time zone: UTC+07:00 (Indochina Time)

Yên Khánh is a former rural district of Ninh Bình province in the Red River Delta region of Vietnam. As of 2003 the district had a population of 141,471. The district covers an area of 142 km^{2}. The district capital lies at Yên Ninh.

== Notable people ==
- Phan Thi Bich Hang, purported psychic
