= Vietnam Buddhist Sangha =

Vietnamese religious organization

- Giáo hội Phật giáo Việt Nam
- Emblem

- Flag
- Headquarters: Quán Sứ Pagoda
- Supreme Patriarch of the Verification Council: The Most Venerable Thích Trí Quảng
- Chairman of the Administration Council: The Most Venerable Thích Thiện Nhơn
- Parent organization: Vietnam Fatherland Front
- Subsidiaries: Vietnamese Buddhist Youth Association
- Website: ghpgvn.vn
- Remarks: Slogan: Đạo pháp - Dân tộc - Chủ nghĩa xã hội (Dharma – Nation – Socialism); Anthem: Phật Giáo Việt Nam

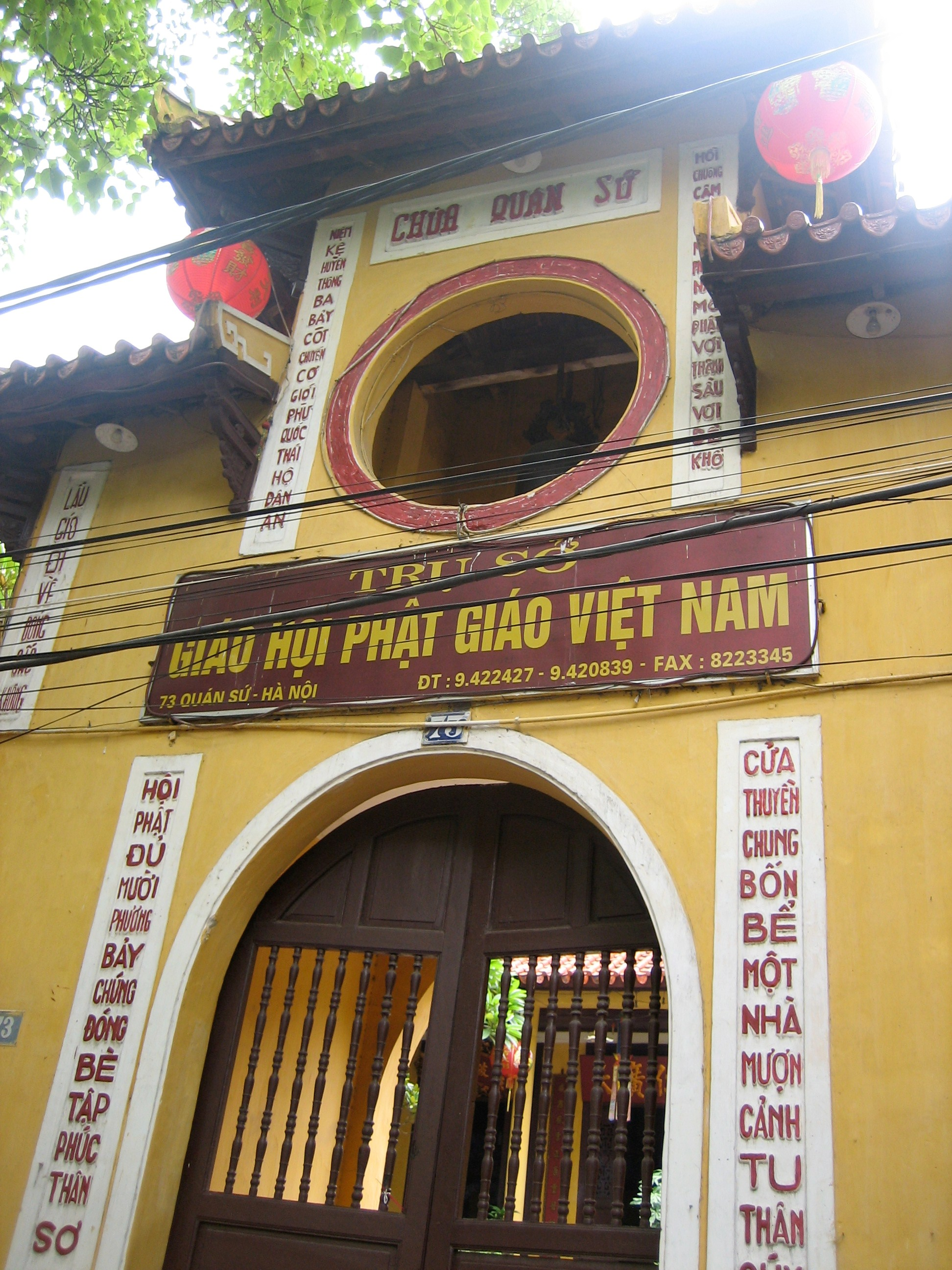
Headquarters of the Buddhist Sangha of Vietnam at Quán Sứ Pagoda, Hanoi

The Vietnam Buddhist Sangha (VBS; Vietnamese: Giáo hội Phật giáo Việt Nam) is the only Buddhist sangha recognised by the Vietnamese government, and a member of the Vietnamese Fatherland Front. It was founded after Vietnam's Buddhist Convention at Quán Sứ Pagoda on November 7, 1981, to unify Buddhist activities of Vietnamese monks, nuns and lay followers.

== History ==
During the Nguyen dynasty and French protectorate, there was no nation-wide Buddhist organization. Instead there were small independent Buddhist associations such as:

- Cochinchina Association for Buddhism Research: in Cochinchina
- Vietnam Elder Sangha: in Cochinchina
- Annam Association of Buddhist Studies: in Annam
- Central Vietnam Elder Sangha: in Annam
- Tonkin Buddhist Association: in Tonkin
- North Vietnam Association of Buddhist Monk Regulation: in Tonkin

After Communist Party of Vietnam and Viet Minh were founded in 1930 and 1941 respectively, many Buddhist Associations for National Salvation (Hội Phật giáo Cứu quốc) were formed across Vietnam. Many Buddhist monks and followers joined the revolution and war against Japanese and French. When the Democratic Republic of Vietnam was founded in 1945, those Buddhist Association for National Salvation became official members of the independent socialist state.

On May 5, 1951, the first unified organization was formed in Huế (State of Vietnam) and called General Buddhist Association of Vietnam (Tổng hội Phật giáo Việt Nam). The first leader was Thích Tịnh Khiết.

Another organization named National Elder Sangha of Vietnam (Giáo hội Tăng già Toàn quốc) was formed on September 7, 1951 in Hanoi (State of Vietnam). Its leader was Thích Tâm Thi.

Upon Viet Minh's victory over the French in 1954, the Democratic Republic of Vietnam (North Vietnam) unified all Buddhist sect into an organization called Unified Buddhist Association of Vietnam (Hội Phật giáo Thống nhất Việt Nam) in 1958. The first leader was Thích Trí Độ, and the headquarter was in Hanoi.

In the Republic of Vietnam (South Vietnam), the Buddhists did not formally establish a Buddhist organization until January 4, 1964 when the Unified Buddhist Church of Vietnam (Giáo hội Phật giáo Việt Nam Thống nhất) was formed. Many conflicts between Buddhist followers and the government erupted due to pro-Catholic stand of the Government of South Vietnam. The conflicts include the 1963 Buddhist crisis and the Buddhist Uprising in 1966. Famous Buddhist leaders at this time were Thích Quảng Đức, Thích Trí Quang, Thích Tâm Châu and Thích Nhất Hạnh.

Later on the government of South Vietnam attempted to win support from Buddhists. The Unified Buddhist Church was divided into anti-communist faction (Quoc Tu faction) and pro-communist faction (An Quang faction) which later supported the National Liberation Front (though unofficially). In 1964 Zen Master Thích Nhất Hạnh fled to France due to suppression from South Vietnam's government. There he joined anti-war movements and established an overseas organization named Eglise Bouddhique Unifiée du Vietnam in 1969. His organization was independent and separate from the South Vietnam's Unified Buddhist Church. His sangha was renamed to Plum Village Community of Engaged Buddhism (Cộng đồng Làng Mai Phật giáo Dấn thân) in 1998.

After the establishment of the Socialist Republic of Vietnam in 1975, at first the communist government promoted atheism and did not establish any Buddhist organizations. On November 7, 1981 a new official national organization was formed in Hanoi, called Vietnam Buddhist Sangha (Giáo hội Phật giáo Việt Nam). The first Supreme Patriarch was Thích Đức Nhuận and the first Chairman was Thích Trí Thủ. The new sangha unified many Buddhist sects and organizations at that time which were:

- Unified Buddhist Association of Vietnam
- Unified Buddhist Church of Vietnam
- Traditional Buddhist Sangha of Vietnam
- Elder Sangha of Theravada Buddhism of Vietnam
- Patriotic Buddhist Group
- Thien Thai Giao Quan Tong Sangha
- Elder Sangha of Mendicant Buddhism of Vietnam
- United Association of Patriotic monks in Southeastern Vietnam
- Buddhist Study Association in South Vietnam

Although many followers of the Unified Buddhist Church (UBC) decided to join the new Buddhist Sangha, some followers resented the socialist government and opposed the move. So the un-recognized Unified Buddhist Church still exists today in Vietnam (but very scattered and divided), and in overseas. At the moment the UBC is formally banned in Vietnam.

In 2008 Thich Nhat Hanh returned to Vietnam for the first time. However some conflicts between overseas and Vietnamese Buddhists arose, thus he again went back to France. Nonetheless he finally returned to Vietnam permanently in 2018 until his death. At the moment, his Plum Village of Engaged Buddhism is still independent from Vietnam Buddhist Sangha, but the co-operation between the 2 organizations is increasing.

== Organization ==
At the national level, the VBS consists of:

- The Patronage Council, also called the Dharma Council (Hội đồng Chứng minh): this is the supreme leadership organ; it is responsible for regulating and interpreting Buddhist teachings, rules, laws, dharma and rituals; the council has 96 members and headed by the Supreme Patriarch (Pháp chủ)
- The Executive Council (Hội đồng Trị sự): this is the administrating organ; it is responsible for organizing, performing and regulating daily works, tasks and functions of the VBS; the council has 270 members and headed by the Chairman (Chủ tịch)

Both councils are elected and approved by the National Buddhist Congress (Đại hội Đại biểu Phật giáo Toàn quốc) which meets every 5 years. Therefore the terms of the members of both councils are 5 years with no limits on number of terms. The Congress also elects the Supreme Patriarch and Chairman.

At the provincial level, there are provincial and municipal executive committees. At the district level, there are city and district executive committees.

== Leadership ==
The current Supreme Patriarch of the Patronage Council is Most Venerable Thích Trí Quảng since 29/11/2022. The current Chairman of the Executive Council is Most Venerable Thích Thiện Nhơn since 11/9/2014.

List of the Supreme Patriarchs of the Patronage Council of the Vietnam Buddhist Sangha:

- First Supreme Patriarch: Thích Đức Nhuận (1897–1993), from 1981 to 1993
  - The position was vacant from 1993 to 1997
- Second Supreme Patriarch: Thích Tâm Tịch (1915–2005), from 1997 to 2005
  - The position was vacant from 2005 to 2007
- Third Supreme Patriarch: Thích Phổ Tuệ (1917–2021), from 2007 to 2021
  - The position was vacant from 2021 to 2022
- Current and Fourth Supreme Patriarch: Thích Trí Quảng, since 2022

List of the Chairmen of the Executive Council of the Vietnam Buddhist Sangha:

- First Chairman: Thích Trí Thủ (1909–1984), from 1981 to 1984
- Second Chairman: Thích Trí Tịnh (1917–2014), from 1984 to 2014
  - The position was vacant from 2014 to 2015
- Current and Third Chairman: Thích Thiện Nhơn, since 2015

== Ideology ==
VBS aims to unite all Buddhist branches, including Theravada, Mahayana and Vajrayana. Currently the majority of Vietnamese Buddhists follow Mahayana, while Khmer Krom people in the south follow Theravada, and very few people follow Vajrayana.

The inclusion of Marxism-Leninism in the entrance exam for the Master's program in Buddhist Studies at the Vietnam Buddhist Academy in Ho Chi Minh City in 2017 sparked controversy.

== See also ==
- Unified Buddhist Church of Vietnam
- Buddhist Association of China
- Korea Buddhists Federation
- Central Spiritual Board of Buddhists of the USSR
