= Trà Ôn district =

Coordinates: 10.000°N 106.033°E

Trà Ôn district Huyện Trà Ôn
- District
- Interactive map of Trà Ôn district
- Country: Vietnam
- Region: Mekong Delta
- Province: Vĩnh Long province
- Capital: Trà Ôn

Area
  - Total: 100 sq mi (258 km^{2})

Population (2003)
  - Total: 149,983
  - Density: 1,510/sq mi (581/km^{2})
- Time zone: UTC+7 (UTC + 7)

Trà Ôn is a rural district of Vĩnh Long province in the Mekong Delta region of Vietnam. It is known particularly for its pomelos, which are called bưởi Năm Roi. As of 2003 the district had a population of 149,983. The district covers an area of 258 km^{2} (100 sq mi). The district capital lies at Trà Ôn.
