= 1964 in the Vietnam War =

← 1963 1965 →
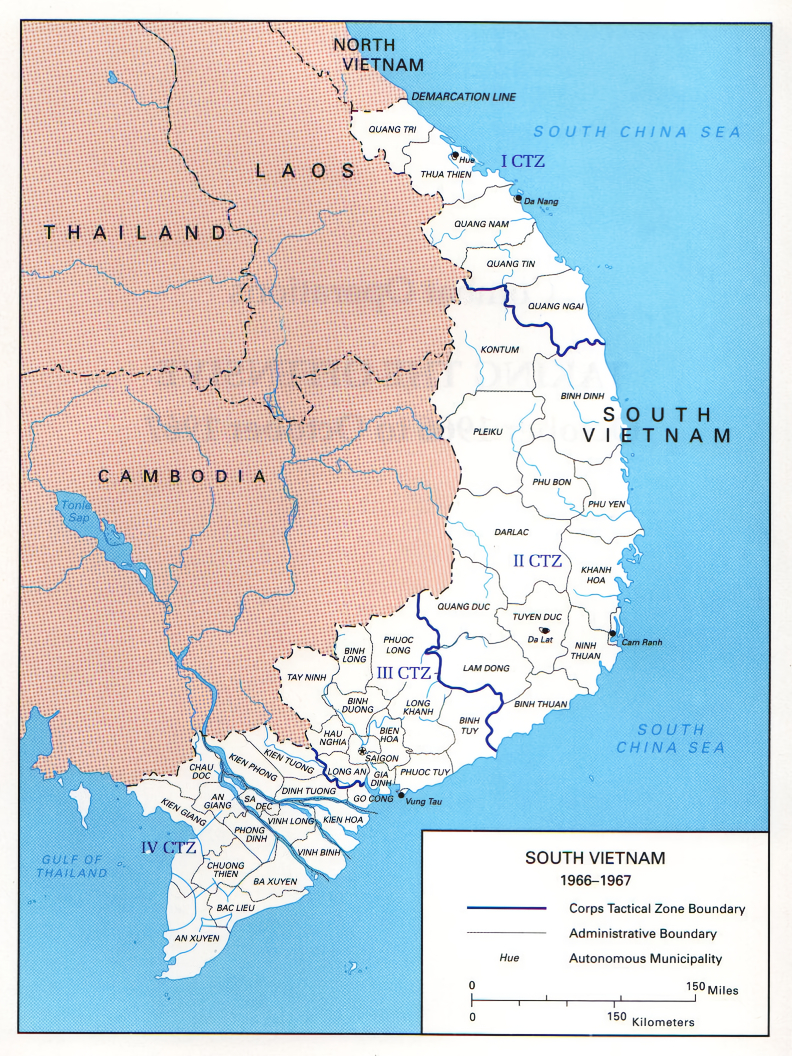
- A map of South Vietnam showing provincial boundaries and names and military zones: I, II, III, and IV Corps.
Location	Indochina

Belligerents
Anti-Communist forces: South Vietnam; United States; Kingdom of Laos	Communist forces: North Vietnam (Provisional Revolutionary Government of the Republic of South Vietnam) Viet Cong (Laos) Pathet Lao; Soviet Union

Strength
US: 23,310 (31 Dec 1964); South Vietnam: 514,000 (includes militia)	PAVN/VC: 100,000

Casualties and losses
US: 216 killed South Vietnam: 7,457 killed	U.S estimate: 16,785 killed

South Vietnam was in political chaos during much of the year, as generals competed for power and Buddhists protested against the government. The Viet Cong (VC) communist guerrillas expanded their operations and defeated the South Vietnamese Army of the Republic of Vietnam (ARVN) in many battles. North Vietnam made a definitive judgement in January to assist the VC insurgency with men and material. In November, North Vietnam ordered the People's Army of Vietnam (PAVN) to infiltrate units into South Vietnam and undertake joint military operations with the VC.

The new President of the United States, Lyndon Johnson, and his civilian and military advisers wrestled with the problem of a failing government in South Vietnam and military gains by the VC. In August, an attack on United States Navy vessels caused Johnson to seek and gain U.S. congressional approval of the Tonkin Gulf Resolution, which authorized him to use military force if necessary to defend South Vietnam. Throughout the year, there were calls from many quarters—American, foreign, and South Vietnamese—for the United States to negotiate an agreement for the neutralization of South Vietnam, which they refused to consider.

Many of Johnson's advisers advocated an air war against North Vietnam and the introduction of U.S. combat troops into South Vietnam. By year's end, the 23,000 U.S. military personnel in South Vietnam were still technically "advisers" (although they participated in many air and ground operations with the ARVN), but Johnson was contemplating U.S. ground troops.

== January ==
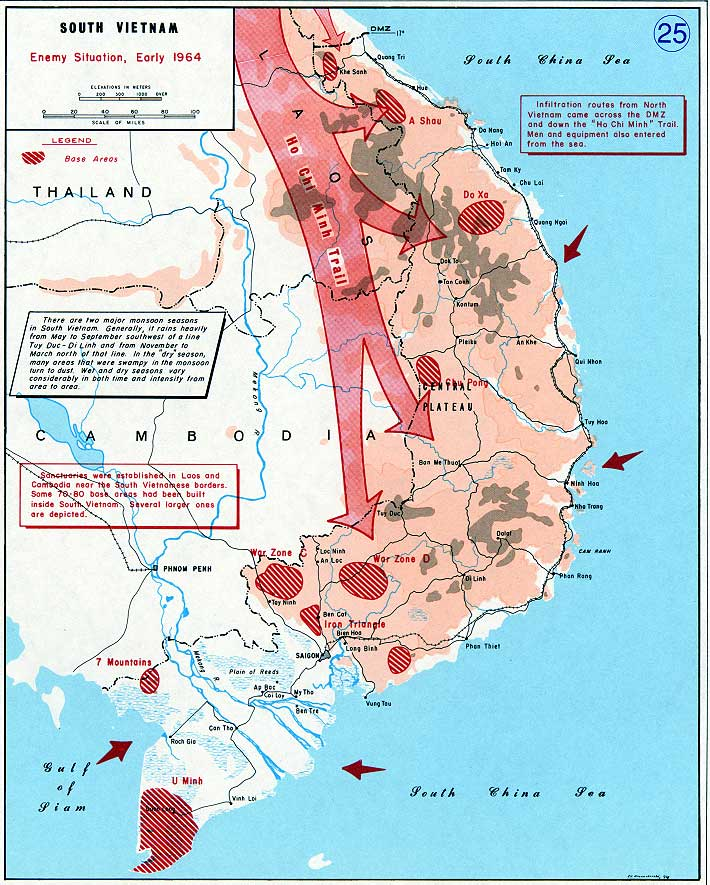
A U.S. government depiction of the military situation in South Vietnam in early 1964.

2 January

United States Marine Corps (USMC) Major general Victor H. Krulak, along with a committee of experts asked to advise on the war, submitted a recommendation to President Johnson for a three phase series of covert actions against North Vietnam. Phase I, for February to May, called for propaganda dissemination and "20 destructive undertakings ... designed to result in substantial destruction, economic loss and harassment", and a second and third phase of increasing magnitude.

The ARVN captured a large arms cache in the Mekong Delta, including weapons manufactured in China. United States Secretary of State Dean Rusk said this proved that North Vietnam was supplying the VC.

4-6 January

A VC battalion massed near My Tinh An hamlet near the border with Định Tường province. The VC were soon surrounded by a Ranger company, two Civil Guard companies, and Self-Defense Corps elements. On the morning of the 5th the ARVN 8th Airborne Battalion supported by M113 armored personnel carriers attacked, but became bogged down. The Airborne withdrew and artillery and airstrikes hit the VC, with one airstrike accidentally hitting ARVN forces. By the morning of the 6th the VC had withdrawn leaving only one body, but radio intercepts and local villagers reported that the VC had evacuated about 100 corpses. The next day a shallow grave containing 41 VC dead was found. The ARVN lost ten killed and thirty-six wounded, with an M113 and seven aircraft damaged.

6 January

VC sappers destroyed 201,780 gallons of petroleum products in Vĩnh Long.

10 January

United States Ambassador to South Vietnam Henry Cabot Lodge Jr. reported to Washington that the new President of South Vietnam Dương Văn Minh told him that he opposed American soldiers going into villages and districts of rural Vietnam as they would be perceived as "more imperialistic than the French" and would give credence to communist propaganda that the Saigon government was a lackey of the United States.

14 January

Theodore Sorensen, one of former President John F. Kennedy's most trusted aides, wrote to Johnson to oppose the neutralization of South Vietnam as proposed by French President Charles de Gaulle and others. Sorensoen said neutralization would result in a communist takeover of South Vietnam, weaken the U.S. position in Asia, and cause political problems for the Democratic Party. Johnson's principal advisers—Dean Rusk, Robert McNamara, McGeorge Bundy and Walter Rostow—echoed Sorensen's views. In December, Senator Mike Mansfield had proposed negotiation of a neutral South Vietnam.

Lieutenant general William C. Westmoreland was appointed deputy commander of Military Assistance Command, Vietnam (MACV).

An ARVN company withdrawing from the operational area of Operation Dan Tam I in War Zone D was ambushed by approximately 500 VC of the D800 Battalion. Artillery support was called in, but after an hour the unit commander radioed that the VC had broken contact. When relief forces arrived, it was revealed that the commander had been forced to send a false message after the unit had been overrun. ARVN losses were six dead, 43 missing, and 34 wounded and more than 70 weapons lost. VC losses were two dead and one captured.

16 January-5 February

Operation Phuong Hoang I in Thạnh Phú district was initially met with heavy VC resistance. It resulted in 85 VC killed and 72 captured. ARVN losses were 15 killed and 40 wounded. US losses were four killed, six wounded, two missing, and two helicopters destroyed.

20 January

The Central Committee of the Communist Party of Vietnam adopted Resolution 9. The secret resolution declared all-out war on South Vietnam to defeat the ARVN before the United States could introduce a large number of American soldiers into the war. The Resolution estimated that American soldiers participating in the war would not exceed 100,000. The Americans "clearly understand that if they get bogged down in a large-scale protracted war, then they will fall into an extremely defensive position internationally." Diplomacy would be expanded to gain "the sympathy of antiwar groups in the United States" and other people around the world. Finally, the Resolution called for a purge of party members in North Vietnam who had emphasized socialistic development in North Vietnam rather than North Vietnamese help for the "liberation" of the South. Resolution 9 was the most important Communist party decision on action in South Vietnam since the Geneva Accords of 1954, which had provisionally separated North and South Vietnam pending national elections (never held, due to opposition by the government of South Vietnam).

With the adoption of Resolution 9, party moderates such as Ho Chi Minh and Võ Nguyên Giáp were marginalized and those who supported the Soviet policy of peaceful coexistence were purged in what became known as the "Revisionist Anti-Party Affair." Militant leaders such as Lê Duẩn and Lê Đức Thọ who favored the Chinese Maoist approach of worldwide revolution took command of the Communist Party and North Vietnam.

22 January

The U.S. Joint Chiefs of Staff sent a classified memorandum to U.S. Secretary of Defense McNamara, urging an expansion of U.S. involvement in the war, advocating heavy bombing of North Vietnam, and deployment of troops in South Vietnam for an eventual invasion of the North.

23 January

The VC U Minh Battalion overran Năm Căn. It damaged the police station and burned eight military and 20 civilian buildings. Before withdrawing, it used 75mm recoilless rifles to sink a landing craft and two patrol vessels sent to aid the town.

24 January

Military Assistance Command, Vietnam – Studies and Observations Group (MACV-SOG) was established to conduct covert unconventional warfare operations in Vietnam.

30 January

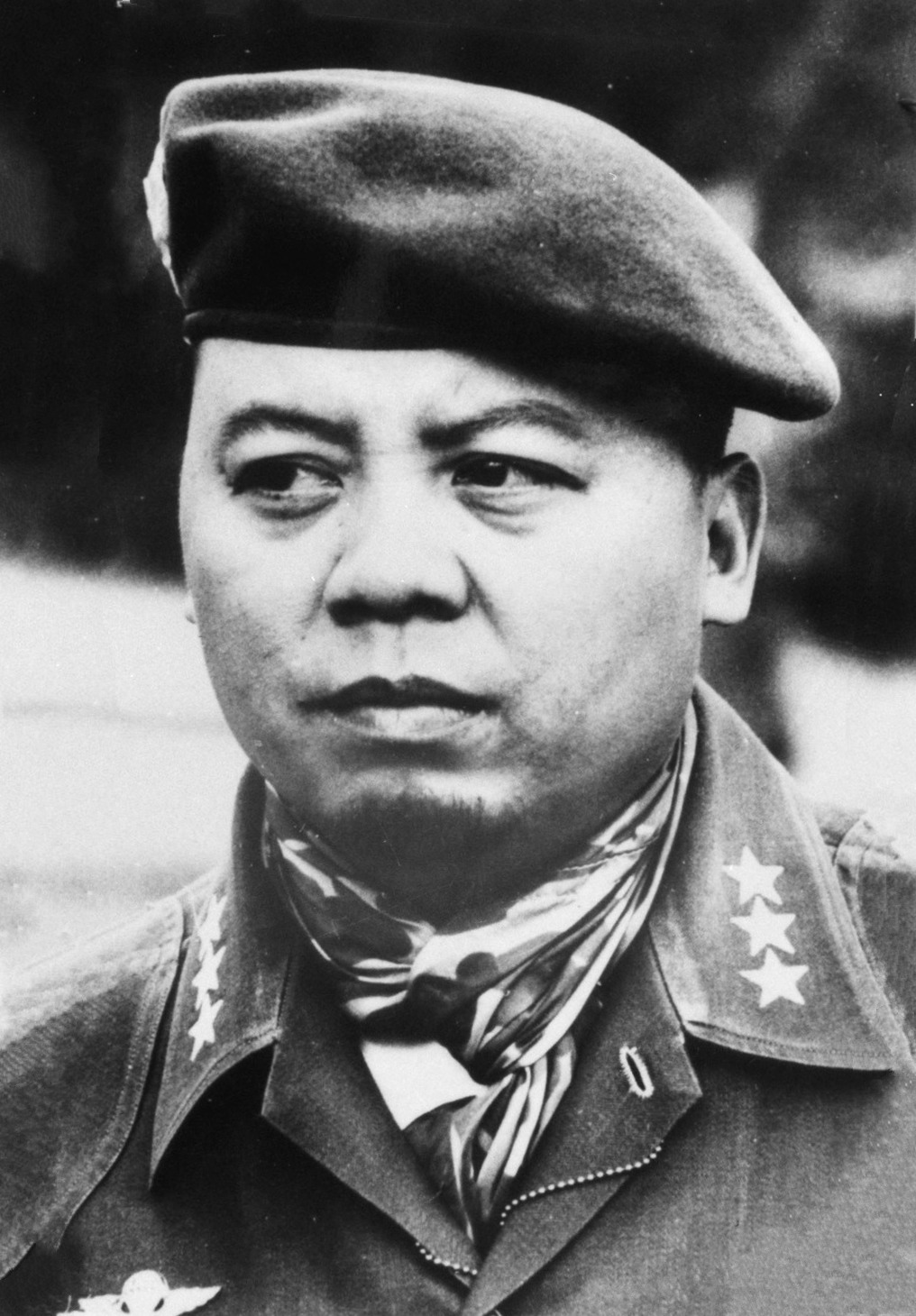
General Nguyễn Khánh

General Nguyễn Khánh led a successful coup ousting the military junta led by General Dương Văn Minh from the leadership of South Vietnam. It came less than three months after Minh's junta had come to power in a coup d'état which overthrew and killed then President Ngô Đình Diệm. The only casualty of the coup was the execution of Minh's aide, Major Nguyen Van Nhung, and lasted only a few hours. Khánh would allow Minh to resume the office of President nine days later and place himself in the role of prime minister. Minh's colleagues, Generals Tran Van Don, Le Van Kim and Ton That Dinh were placed under house arrest, accused of planning a neutralist takeover of South Vietnam.

31 January

Journalist James Reston in The New York Times called for the U.S. to seek a negotiated settlement to the war in South Vietnam. Reston's view echoed that of French President de Gaulle who was advocating that negotiations begin to make South Vietnam a neutral country

== February ==
1 February

United States Senate Majority Leader Mike Mansfield told President Johnson that the overthrow of the Minh government was unlikely to result in "significant improvement in the situation" in South Vietnam. Mansfield said the coup was "likely to be only the second in a series as military leaders, released from all civilian restraint, jockey for control of the power which resides in United States aid."

The VC announced a new anti-American terror campaign, offering a bounty of $250 for each American killed. A bomb exploded at the Playboy Bar in Saigon killing five Vietnamese and wounded many other people, including six Americans.

3 February

The new leader of South Vietnam, General Khánh, reversed an earlier decision by Minh by giving his approval to the assignment of additional American military and civilian advisers and authorizing U.S.-directed covert operations in North Vietnam under Operation 34A (OPLAN 34A).

The North Vietnamese Vietnam People's Air Force (VPAF) established its first jet fighter unit, the 921st Sao Dao Fighter Regiment. A few weeks later, the first VPAF jet pilots began their training in the Soviet Union.

4 February

The VC overran an ARVN battalion headquarters at Hau May killing 12 ARVN.

The VC 504th Battalion and elements of the 261st Battalion successfully attacked the understrength 2nd Battalion, 12th Infantry, at Phu My. The VC killed 13 ARVN, wounded 25, and captured two 81mm mortars, 19 firearms, and six radios. The VC left behind six dead and two weapons. The VC also destroyed the homes of 300 people.

6-7 February

The VC overran an outpost and three hamlets at Ap Ben Cau, 19km south of Tay Ninh City, killing 65 of the 188 Self-Defense Force and militia defenders and capturing 50 weapons. The VC then fortified the hamlets waiting for a government relief force. The ARVN 5th Division responded ineffectively and the VC were able to withdraw. ARVN losses were 27 dead, 66 wounded, and 34 missing. The South Vietnamese claimed, based on captured documents, that the VC had lost 61 dead and 105 wounded. 27 civilians were killed and 29 wounded.

9 February

A VC bombing attack on a softball game at Pershing Field killed two Americans and wounded 41, including four women and five children. A second bomb failed to explode.

The VC 71st Battalion overran the district capital of Ba Long in Quang Tri Province, inflicting 38 casualties and capturing four mortars, two machine guns and 86 other weapons.

16 February

The VPAF scored its first aerial victory against an American aircraft when a T-28 Trojan, whose pilot had defected to North Vietnam from the Royal Lao Air Force, shot down a C-123 Provider transport.

A VC shot and killed a U.S. MP outside the Kinh Do movie theater and then entered the theater and exploded a bomb killing three Americans with a further 32 wounded, most of them U.S. dependents.

17 February

David Nes, the Deputy Chief of Mission of the U.S. Embassy in Saigon, wrote a pessimistic memorandum to Ambassador Lodge and senior officials in Washington. Nes did not see much prospect for the improvement of South Vietnamese performance. He said that escalation of the U.S. military effort might be the only alternative to the neutralization of South Vietnam as proposed by de Gaulle and others.

24 February

Khanh issued the Chien Thang (Struggle for Victory) pacification program.

25 February

The VC bombed a train travelling from Saigon to Da Nang killing 11.

26 February

In the Battle of Long Dinh the ARVN, despite overwhelming numbers and firepower, was not aggressive in its attack and the VC 514th Battalion escaped. The battle resulted in 89 VC killed and two captured and 19 ARVN killed.

== March ==
3 March

The 1st and 8th Airborne Battalions commanded by Colonel Cao Văn Viên attempted to encircle the VC 502nd Battalion about 10km north of Tan Chau, near the Cambodian border. Instead, at dawn the VC ambushed the Airborne from entrenched positions using automatic rifles, recoilless rifles, and mortars. Three more infantry battalions and artillery were deployed to support the Airborne. Restrictions on the use of aircraft near the border limited aerial support and the closeness of the combatants sometimes prevented the artillery from firing. The fighting raged until 09:00 when the VC broke contact and fled across the border. ARVN losses were 15 dead and 85 wounded, VC dead were estimated at 130.

4 March

Johnson met with the Joint Chiefs of Staff. The Chairman of the Joint Chiefs of Staff General Maxwell Taylor recommended a "progressive and selective attack on targets in North Vietnam." Johnson, however, disagreed, saying that "he did not want to start a war before November" because of the impact an expanded war might have on the Presidential elections that month.

11 March-26 April

An ARVN 43rd Infantry Regiment operation in the Ara Salour region, a VC base located at the conjunction of Lam Dong, Binh Tuy, and Binh Thuan provinces resulted in 98 VC killed (30 by US helicopter gunships) and 37 captured for the loss of six ARVN and two US killed.

14 March

The ARVN captured more than 500 suspected VC in a raid in Kien Phong Province.

An airborne battalion and two ranger companies attempted to envelop two VC battalions near the Cai Cai canal. The operation killed 14 VC and captured 70.

15 March

In what one historian would describe as "the earliest expression" of "antiwar feeling among American college students" in response to the war, students at Yale University concluded a three-day long conference on socialism that included members of the new Students for a Democratic Society and launched the "May 2nd Movement" (M2M), and adjourned with plans for an antiwar demonstration in New York City for 2 May 1964.

16 March

Secretary of Defense McNamara wrote a memo to Johnson after returning from his most recent visit to South Vietnam. McNamara said that up to 40 percent of South Vietnam was now controlled by the VC, the Khánh government was ineffective, the South Vietnamese apathetic and the Americans in South Vietnam frustrated. He recommended that the U.S. finance a 50,000 man increase in the size of the ARVN. He also recommended that the United States Air Force (USAF) be prepared to initiate bombing of North Vietnam. Johnson approved the plan and directed its implementation.

17 March

What would become known as the "domino theory" became the basis for American policy on Vietnam, after Johnson approved National Security Action Memorandum 288 and the recommendations made to him by McNamara. "We seek an independent non-Communist South Vietnam," McNamara wrote, adding that "unless we can achieve this objective ... almost all of Southeast Asia will probably fall under Communist dominance", starting with South Vietnam, Laos, and Cambodia, followed by Burma and Malaysia. "Thailand might hold for a period with our help, but would be under grave pressure. Even the Philippines would become shaky and the threat to India to the west, Australia and New Zealand to the south and Taiwan, Korea, and Japan to the north and east would be greatly increased."

19 March

ARVN troops accompanied by U.S. Army advisers, mistakenly crossed the border into Cambodia and attacked the village of Chanthrea, killing 17 civilians.

22-3 March

The VC attempted to overrun Hau My village in the northwestern corner of Định Tường province. They captured six of seven defensive posts, but a machine gun at the last one held out, inflicting heavy casualties. On the 23rd two Civil Guard companies pushed the VC 502nd Battalion back 1,200 meters in a daylong pursuit in which reinforcements rushed to encircle the VC. Fighter-bombers could not strike because of the proximity of the combatants. After eight hours, an M113 troop launched a final assault. The VC who survived exfiltrated that night. The allies (South Vietnam and the Free World Military Assistance Forces) counted 113 dead VC and captured two machine guns and 18 rifles, having lost 14 casualties themselves.

The VC 502nd Battalion attacked a small post at My Hoi in Kien Van District. Two battalions of the 10th Infantry, the 19th Civil Guard Battalion, a ranger battalion, a mechanized company, and two additional companies of Civil Guard surrounded the VC. In an attack poorly executed by hesitant ARVN forces, the VC held out and then exfiltrated after dark. ARVN losses were three killed and 11 wounded. Advisers counted 13 VC dead, but the South Vietnamese claimed they had killed 126. The Americans verified that the ARVN captured two machine guns, four automatic rifles, and 14 other firearms.

24 March

Định Tường province chief, Colonel Tan Hoang Quan was killed in his jeep by a VC mine.

26 March

Senator Wayne Morse was the only prominent American politician to publicly oppose American military involvement in South Vietnam. Morse strongly disagreed with McNamara's assessment of the situation in Vietnam. To refute McNamara's contention that the U.S. was fighting communism in South Vietnam, Morse said, "There are no Chinese soldiers in South Vietnam. There are no Russian soldiers in South Vietnam. The only foreign soldiers in South Vietnam are U.S. soldiers."

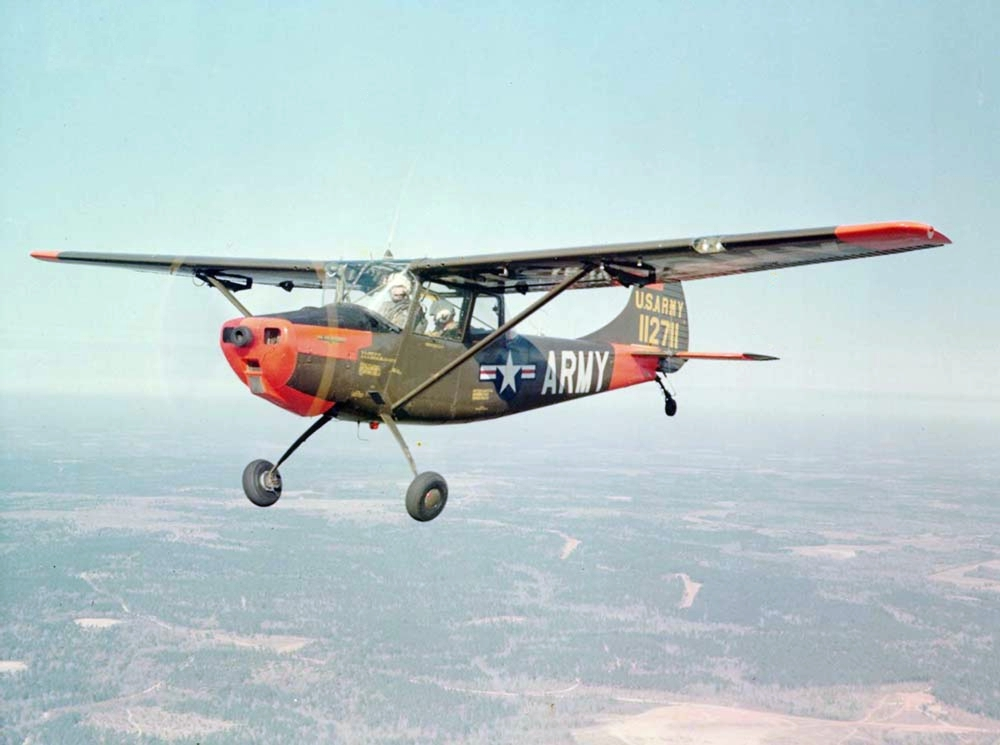
An O-1 Bird Dog

U.S. Army Captain Floyd James Thompson was captured by the VC after he and his pilot, Richard L. Whitesides flying in an O-1 Bird Dog, were shot down over Quảng Trị Province. Whitesides was killed in the crash, while Thompson was sent to a prison camp in North Vietnam. Released on 16 March 1973, Thompson remains the longest serving American prisoner of war.

== April ==
3-4 April

The VC 1st Regiment attacked Phuoc Tan New Life hamlet, 2km from the Cambodian border, destroying 186 houses. The ARVN 5th Division relief force was attacked as it approached, but was able to withdraw with air, artillery and helicopter gunship support. A JGS study based on captured documents reported VC losses as 63 killed and 197 wounded. South Vietnamese losses were 25 dead, 22 wounded, and two missing.

4 April

Former Vice President Richard Nixon said that Johnson's plans to defeat the communists in South Vietnam "may be inadequate." He said that a visit to South Vietnam had persuaded him that "Johnson's Vietnam policy would not succeed."

VC soldiers crossed over from Cambodia and overran Tan Thanh hamlet, killing ten Civil Guards and ten civilians. Another 25 people were either wounded or missing and the VC captured a machine gun, and 34 firearms.

9 April

The VC attacked an ARVN training camp at Phuoc Loi 15 miles (24 km) south of Saigon killing 24 ARVN and two civilians. 37 trainees went missing and the VC captured 115 weapons.

The ARVN captured a VC base on the Laotian border killing 75 VC.

The VC attacked a post held by 20 Self-Defense Corps soldiers and their families at An Loc Thi, a village near Mỏ Cày, killing everyone. Two VC battalions ambushed an ARVN battalion relief force, triggering an all-day battle, before the VC withdrew that night. During the pursuit, the tail boom of a UH-1B suddenly detached, killing 10 allied soldiers and injuring one, leading to the grounding of other UH–1Bs that showed signs of tail boom stress. ARVN losses were 22 dead, 23 wounded, and 13 missing. U.S losses were four dead and three wounded. In addition to the UH-1B crash, the VC had shot down two more helicopters and a T–28 aircraft. The allies found 50 VC bodies.

11-12 April

In the Battle of Kien Long the VC captured Kiên Long district in Chương Thiện Province and were later evicted by the ARVN with U.S. air support. The battle resulted in 175 VC killed and 55 ARVN killed and 17 missing.

12 April

ARVN forces comprising an infantry battalion, a ranger company, and a composite territorial battalion attacked a VC 502nd Battalion base 20km southeast of Cao Lãnh district. U.S. and RVNAF aircraft supported the action with ten sorties. Fourteen ARVN were killed and 27 wounded. The VC lost 85 dead and 17 weapons.

19 April

At a meeting in Saigon, U.S. Ambassador Lodge proposed that the U.S. send a neutral interlocutor to Hanoi to present an ultimatum to North Vietnam to "call off" the VC. Canadian diplomat J. Blair Seaborn was later selected to undertake the mission after consultations between Canada and the United States.

In Laos, the coalition government of Prince Souvanna Phouma was deposed by a right-wing military group, led by Brigadier General Kouprasith Abhay. Souvanna and other cabinet members were placed under house arrest and the Geneva Accords that had kept an uneasy peace with the left-wing Pathet Lao were on the verge of collapsing while U.S. Ambassador to Laos Leonard S. Unger was out of town. Unger rushed back to the Laotian capital of Vientiane and rushed to Souvanna's residence where, as one historian would later note, a "'Romeo and Juliet' scene took place, as Souvanna Phouma stood at a balcony on the second floor and expressed his desire to discontinue premiership, while Ambassador Unger stood on the ground begging him to continue to head the government." Assured of U.S. support for his government, Souvanna resumed his duties as Prime Minister and would remain Prime Minister in office until 1975.

The VC attacked five outposts in Ba Tri district, four of them held, but two VC companies succeeded in capturing Huong Hoa Ha post where they took the wives and children of the defenders hostage. That act did not deter the ARVN, who retook the post. ARVN losses were 16 dead and 26 missing. The VC left behind 15 dead and intelligence estimated that they had evacuated at least 67 more casualties.

22 April

A VC battalion attacked two newly activated Ranger companies conducted a training exercise near Trung Lap killing 12 ARVN and wounding ten and killing one U.S. adviser and wounding three.

26-28 April

The VC attacked a Civil Guard post near Kiên Lương district. The 21st Division responded with three infantry battalions, an M113 troop, and a Civil Guard company. The operation continued for two days. 62 VC were killed, and air force pilots claimed to have killed another 47. Four VC were captured together with a 57mm recoilless rifle, a .50-caliber machine gun, and seven other weapons. Allied losses were 11 dead (including one US advisor), 43 wounded, and two M113s damaged.

27 April

Operation Quyet Thang 202, an ARVN operation carried out with US support, began. The one-month-long operation claimed heavy damage to the Do Xa sanctuary which linked the VC's supply lines between Laos and Vietnam's Central Highlands.

30 April

Former President Kennedy's brother, Robert F. Kennedy, said in an oral interview for the Kennedy Library that President Kennedy had "a strong, overwhelming reason for being in Vietnam and that we should win the war in Vietnam." Kennedy denied that any consideration had been given by the President to withdrawing from Vietnam. He equivocated on the introduction of U.S. ground troops into Vietnam, saying that "we'd face that when we came to it."

== May ==
1 May

The VC bombarded the village of Tam Bang in Kiên Giang province with firebombs shot from log troughs and large slingshots. Then, the VC 306th Battalion and some smaller elements attacked. The battalion failed to breach the town's mud wall, and the territorial soldiers, supported by aerial flares and artillery, repulsed the assault. The firebombs, however, burned the community to the ground. The defenders lost 14 killed and 24 wounded. Reports of civilian casualties ranged from 40 to 70. VC losses were estimated as three dead. However, a month later a VC who had participated in the attack was captured and he stated that the VC actually had lost 29 dead and 30 wounded.

2 May

VC commandos eluded detection and placed an explosive on the USNS Card. The ship, moored in the Saigon River, sunk and five American sailors were killed. The USNS Card was later raised and repaired.

About 1,000 students participated in the first major student demonstration against the Vietnam War, marching in New York City as part of the "May 2nd Movement" that had been organized by students at Yale University. Marches also occurred in San Francisco, Boston, Seattle, and Madison, Wisconsin.

5 May

A U.S. Army CV-2 Caribou crashed shortly after takeoff from Tân Hiệp killing all 15 onboard including ten Americans.

7 May

The Civil Guard was redesignated as the Regional Forces and the Self-Defense Corps as the Popular Forces. Both were placed under the Minister of National Defense and the old Civil Guard battalion headquarters was abolished.

8–9 May

Cambodian forces destroyed an ARVN M113 armored personnel carrier that crossed the border in pursuit of VC. The next day Cambodian and ARVN troops clash resulting in seven Cambodians killed.

9 May

Former President Diem's brother, Ngo Dinh Can was executed by order of General Khanh. U.S. Ambassador Lodge asked that Can's life be spared, but Khanh chose to placate the militant Buddhist movement in South Vietnam. Earlier in the day, Phan Quang Dong, the former chief of Can's secret police force, was executed at the municipal stadium in Huế before a crowd of 40,000 people.

A plot to assassinate Secretary of Defense McNamara was foiled, three days before his visit to South Vietnam, with the arrest of VC agent Nguyễn Văn Trỗi. Trỗi had planned to detonate a bomb as McNamara was being driven across the Cong Ly Bridge in Saigon on 12 May.

12 May

American Ambassador Lodge said in a secret meeting that Buddhist leader Thich Tri Quang is "ambitious, anti-Christian, full of hatreds, and agitating against [the government of] Khanh. He said that "some communist infiltration of Buddhists exists."

14 May

The VC ambushed a 200-man 37th Ranger Battalion force moving to relieve the strategic hamlet of Bau Ca Tre 20 miles (32 km) north of Saigon, 50 Rangers were killed, 31 wounded and 16 missing and two machine guns and 69 individual weapons were lost.

The VC attacked three outposts, a strategic hamlet, and the district town of Tan Uyen about 35km north of Saigon in Binh Duong province. The province chief sent 200 Rangers and two U.S. advisers to help. A VC battalion ambushed the force as it crossed an open field. The ARVN lost 53 dead, 45 wounded, and 16 missing.

15 May

MAAG Vietnam was absorbed into MACV.

16 May

Twelve men in New York City publicly burned their draft cards to protest against the war. The demonstration, with about 50 people in Union Square, was organized by the War Resisters League.

19 May

The U.S. began "Operation Yankee Team", low-level and medium-level reconnaissance flights from South Vietnam over PAVN/VC strongholds in neighboring Laos, at the request of the Royal Laotian Armed Forces. Two days after flights began over southern Laos in the area that was part of the Ho Chi Minh Trail, U.S. Navy planes would conduct sorties over northern Laos.

A VC battalion attacked six border posts in Kiến Tường, overrunning one, killing about 36 defenders, wounding 24, and capturing 87 weapons, including three mortars. Another ten defenders were missing. The VC also sank a landing craft sent to assist the posts.

20 May to mid-September

The USMC Signal Engineering Survey Unit, a radio detachment consisting of three officers and 27 enlisted men drawn from the 1st Radio Company, Fleet Marine Force, Pacific and from Headquarters Marine Corps supported by a 76-man infantry detachment from Company G, 2nd Battalion, 3rd Marines, commanded by Major Alfred M. Gray, Jr. deployed to Danang Air Base. The unit established communication facilities at Khe Sanh, Tiger Tooth Mountain (Dong Voi Mẹp) (16.768°N 106.713°E), Monkey Mountain and Bạch Mã. The unit left South Vietnam in mid-September.

21 May

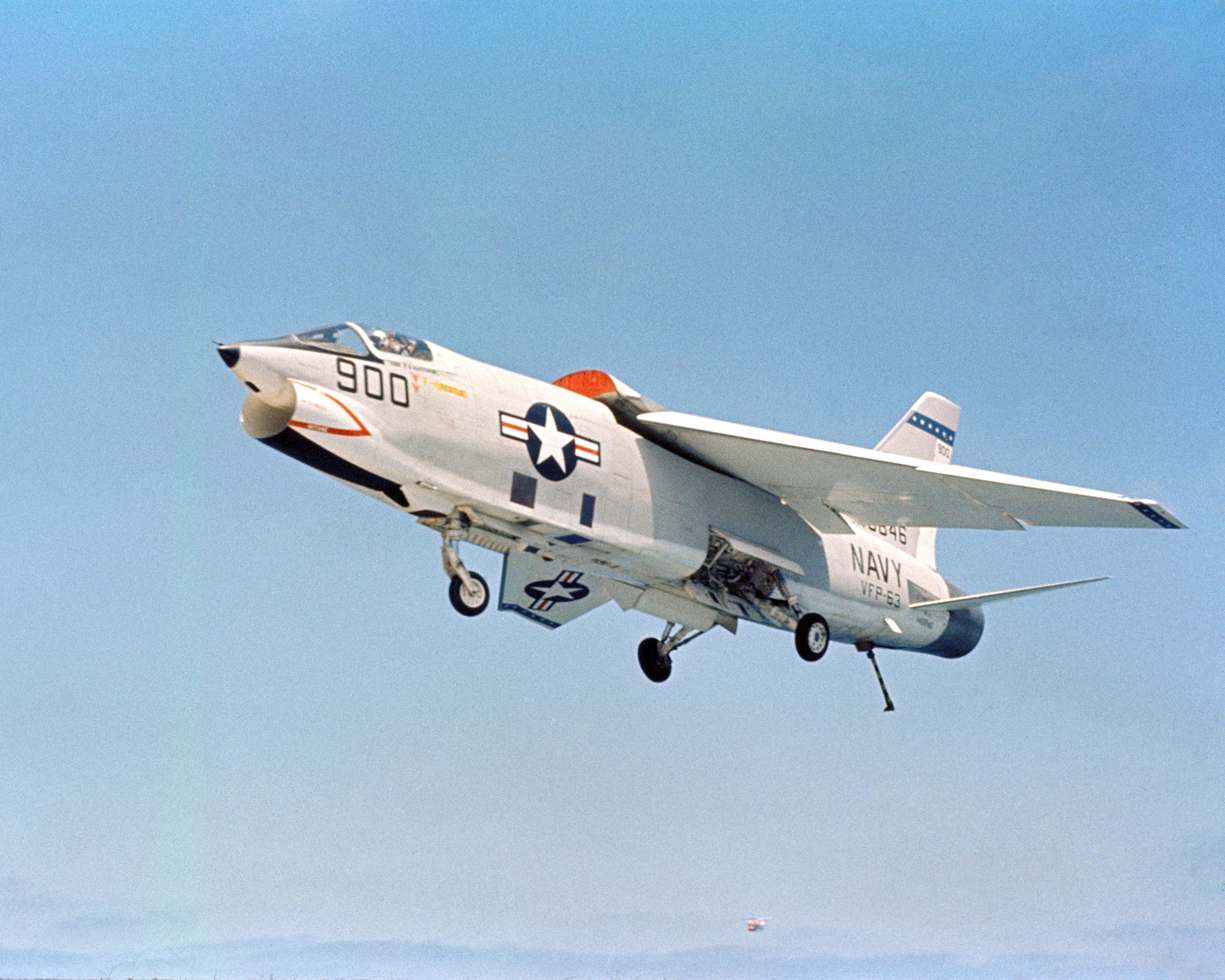
An RF-8A Crusader

Pathet Lao antiaircraft artillery damaged a U.S. Navy RF-8A Crusader that was flying a photographic reconnaissance mission. The RF-8A, flown by U.S. Navy Lieutenant Charles Klusmann, burned for 20 minutes in the air but Klusmann was able to return for a safe landing aboard the USS Kitty Hawk.

23 May

Western sources estimated the PAVN to number 16 divisions totaling 280,000 men, plus militias with 180,000 men, and a border force of 20,000 men. A reserve militia force numbered 400,000. North Vietnam had not yet infiltrated any elements of the PAVN into South Vietnam.

24 May

Senator Barry Goldwater, who would become the Republican Party candidate for President of the United States later in 1964, discussed the use of nuclear bombs against North Vietnam to interrupt supply lines for the VC in South Vietnam. In the face of widespread criticism of his remarks, Goldwater said he was only "repeating a suggestion made by competent military people." Democrats used Goldwater's statements about the use of nuclear weapons to portray him as an extremist in the election campaign.

27 May

President Johnson revealed the depth of his uncertainty about South Vietnam in a conversation with Senator Richard Russell. Johnson said his advisers were telling him to "show some power and some force", but he didn't believe the American people were behind the war. Russell agreed and expressed doubt that bombing North Vietnam would win the war. Johnson said he didn't know how to get out of the Vietnam War, adding that he would be impeached if he were to withdraw from the war. "I don't know how in the hell you're gonna get out unless they [the Senate Republicans] tell you to get out." After the talk with Russell, Johnson telephoned his adviser McGeorge Bundy and said, "I don't think it [South Vietnam] is worth fighting for and I don't think we can get out. It's just the biggest damn mess I ever saw."

28 May

Khánh presided over a trial of the generals he toppled and accused of neutralism, in light of US pressure on him to give his opponents a hearing. Minh was accused of misusing a small amount of money, before being allowed to serve as an advisor on the trial panel. Generals Don, Kim and Dinh were secretly interrogated, mostly about details of their coup against Diệm, rather than the original charge of promoting neutralism. When the court reconvened for the verdict on 29 May, Khánh stated, "We ask that once you begin to serve again in the army, you do not take revenge on anybody". The tribunal then "congratulated" the generals, but found that they were of "lax morality" and unqualified to command due to a "lack of a clear political concept". They were chastised for being "inadequately aware of their heavy responsibility" and of letting "their subordinates take advantage of their positions". The four imprisoned generals were allowed to remain in Da Lat under surveillance with their families. However, there were reports that the trial ended in a festive manner akin to a party, as the officers shook hands and made up with one another. All four generals were barred from commanding troops for a period; Kim was banned for six years, and Đôn 18 months. Offices were prepared for the quartet so that they could participate in "research and planning". When Khánh was himself deposed in 1965, he handed over dossiers proving that the four generals were innocent; the original documents that Khánh claimed proved his accusations of neutralism were neither presented to nor found by anyone.

== June ==
1–2 June

Senior U.S. military and Administration officials conducted a strategy conference at CINCPAC in Hawaii in which they discuss bombing North Vietnam.

2 June

President Johnson called a White House press conference without advance notice and told reporters that the United States was "bound by solemn commitments" to defend South Vietnam against Communist encroachment, and cited a 25 October 1954 letter from U.S. President Dwight D. Eisenhower to South Vietnamese President Ngo Dinh Diem pledging an American promise to protect the Vietnamese government.

2-5 June

The allies launched an action along a 32-kilometer stretch of the Vaico Oriental River west of Phuoc Ninh in Tay Ninh Province. Assisted by 20 U.S. advisers and 36 helicopters, 26 of them gunships, 500 Rangers and special forces soldiers conducted a scorched-earth operation. 25 VC were killed and 1,000 civilians were relocated, following which the area was declared a free-fire zone.

4 June

United Nations Security Council Resolution 189, adopted unanimously, deplored an incident caused by the penetration of military units of South Vietnam into Cambodia and requested compensation for the Cambodians. The resolution also requested that all States and authorities recognize and respect Cambodia's neutrality and territorial integrity, and sent representatives from Brazil, Ivory Coast and Morocco to the sites of the most recent incidents and to report back to the council in 45 days with recommendations.

5 June

Ambassador Lodge sent a cable to Johnson recommending that the United States not send more ground troops into South Vietnam to fight the VC. Such a step, he cautioned, would be a "venture of unlimited possibilities which could put us onto a slope along which we slide into a bottomless pit."

6–7 June

The Pathet Lao shot down a U.S. Navy RF-8A Crusader reconnaissance jet over Laos. Johnson authorized an air strike against a Pathet Lao anti-aircraft battery. The RF-8A pilot, Lieutenant Charles Klusmann was captured by the Pathet Lao and escaped from captivity three months later.

7 June

At 03:30 a VC battalion supported by recoilless rifles and mortars penetrated Duc Hoa, a district town 27km west of Saigon. A fierce, house-to-house fight ensued between the 600 attackers and 140 Rangers and Civil Guards. The VC broke contact at 06:30, leaving 19 dead. The defenders lost 15 dead and 36 wounded.

8 June

Australia's Minister for Defence announced that the Australian Army Training Team Vietnam would be increased to 83 advisers and their role expanded.

III Corps commander Brigadier general Trần Ngọc Tám told his subordinate commanders that the government was losing the war. Over the past two months, the ARVN had lost 489 dead in III Corps compared to 328 VC. He blamed the officer corps’ lack of aggressiveness, knowledge, and leadership for the situation.

18 June

Canadian diplomat Blair Seaborn met with North Vietnamese prime minister Phạm Văn Đồng to deliver a U.S. message. The U.S., he said, would choose escalation of the conflict rather than withdrawal and considered the war to be a confrontation with communism and thus of international importance. Đồng responded that any peaceful settlement in South Vietnam had to result in the withdrawal of the United States, the neutralization of South Vietnam and the eventual reunification of South and North Vietnam. Seaborn's conclusion was that North Vietnam's leaders were "completely convinced that military action at any level is not, repeat not, going to bring success for the US and government forces in South Vietnam." The North Vietnamese emphasized their "quiet determination to go on struggling as long as necessary to achieve objectives which they said they were bound to achieve in the long run."

The New York Times published the remarks of a U.S. military adviser in South Vietnam, later identified as III Corps senior advisor Colonel Wilbur Wilson. Wilson said that the VC were stronger and better armed than they had been three years earlier and that more than 90 percent of their weapons were of U.S. origin, captured from the ARVN. Wilson advocated a massive increase in the U.S. military commitment to South Vietnam.

19 June

A battalion from the VC 1st Regiment ambushed a CIDG company operating out of the newly established Suoi Da CIDG camp, 16km northwest of Tay Ninh City, 37 Vietnamese and one American special forces soldier were killed, while many others including two Americans, were missing.

20 June

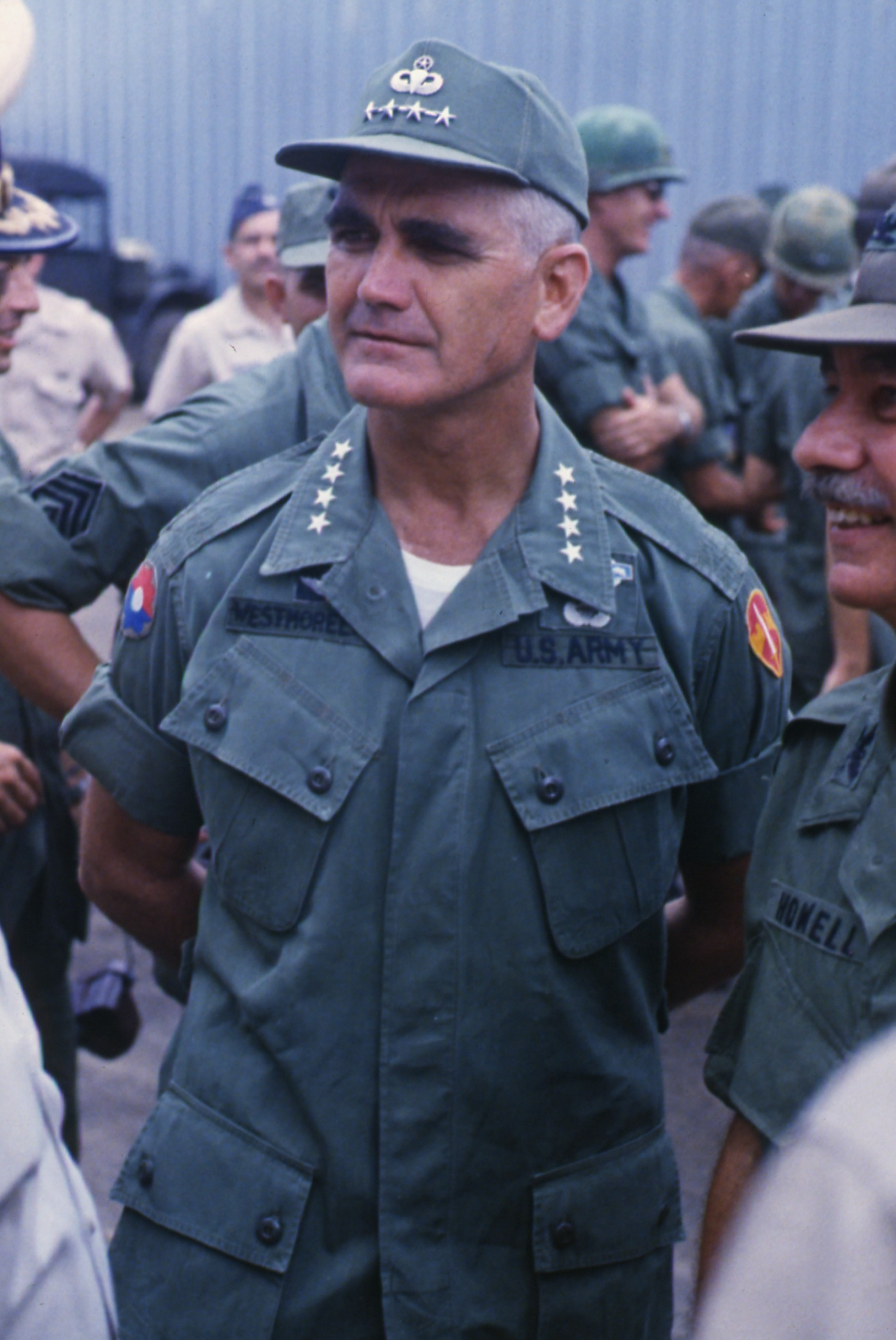
General William Westmoreland

General Westmoreland replaced General Paul D. Harkins as the commander of the Military Assistance Command Vietnam (MACV) General Maxwell Taylor engineered the appointment of Westmoreland, over the objections of some of his military colleagues.

21 June

Elements of the 7th and 9th Divisions massed eight battalions - five infantry, two airborne, and one Civil Guard, a battery of 105mm howitzers and two platoons of 155mm howitzers to encircle an area 15km in diameter centered on the village of My Thien in western Định Tường province. Inside were an estimated 1,000 VC regulars of the 261st, the 502nd, and 514th Battalions, plus two additional companies. The operation began inauspiciously when an RVNAF A-1H fighter-bomber mistakenly attacked the 2nd Battalion, 15th Infantry, causing nine casualties. Themajor fighting started in the afternoon as the 3d Airborne Battalion approached the hamlet of Bang Lang. The unit commander decided not to wait for artillery support and led his men in a bayonet charge across 137 meters of muddy paddy into the teeth of entrenched VC machine guns. The battle raged until dark, with fixed-wing aircraft conducting 14 strikes. VC gunners downed four U.S. helicopters. The VC successfully eluded capture that night and two additional days of searching achieved little. The South Vietnamese lost 29 dead and 85 wounded, VC dead numbered almost 100.

22 June

The ARVN 1st and 3rd Airborne Battalions were on a search-and-destroy operation in support of the 7th Division near Bang Lang, Định Tường province, 72km southwest of Saigon when they ran into the VC 261st and 514th Battalions. VC fire downed four US Army helicopters. US helicopter gunships lent their support to the fight, at one point accidentally inflicting nine casualties on the South Vietnamese. The paratroopers charging the VC multiple times. Hostile fire killed or wounded all nine platoon leaders in the 1st Battalion. The VC retreated at dusk after losing 58 killed, 26 captured and 20 weapons. The Airborne lost 29 killed and 89 wounded.

26 June

The ARVN attacked a VC training camp in Quảng Ngãi Province killing over 50 recruits.

An ARVN armored force attacked a VC force at Bau Cot killing over 100 VC.

The ARVN 14th Infantry encircled the VC Cuu Long I Battalion near Ap Long Hoi, 14km south of the provincial capital of Trà Vinh. After an infantry battalion had taken up a position to the south and two companies of Civil Guard had deployed to the west, the 43rd Ranger Battalion was landed by helicopters north of the target area. The rangers then advanced southward, split on either side of a canal and engaged the entrenched VC. U.S. Army helicopter gunships and RVNAF fighter-bombers continuously hammered the VC, with the VC shooting down one of each. After four hours the VC disengaged leaving 51 dead, one mortar and 34 weapons. ARVN losses were 20 killed and 19 wounded.

27 June

ARVN Rangers attacked a VC force at Long Hoi south of Saigon killing at least 43 VC from the Cuu Long Battalion. Two Americans and one South Vietnamese were killed when their helicopter was shot down and a T-28 was also shot down by the VC.

28 June

French Foreign Minister Maurice Couve de Murville speaking from a studio in Paris to the New York moderators on the NBC show Meet the Press, cautioned that United States could not win the war if it increased its involvement. "This is not an ordinary war," he said. "That means a war you can just settle by victory or defeat. It is not that simple ... the problem cannot be settled by military means but should be settled by political means."

29 June

The Republican members of the United States House of Representatives, released a statement saying, "A victory in South Vietnam over the military and subversive threats of Communism is urgently required." Republican Congressman Gerald Ford said that the U.S. should "take command of the forces in Vietnam and not simply remain advisers."

New Zealand began its first military involvement in the war when a 25-man New Zealand Army engineering detachment arrived at Tan Son Nhut Air Base. The detachment would be based at Thủ Dầu Một, the capital of Bình Dương Province alongside a U.S. advisory team.

== July ==
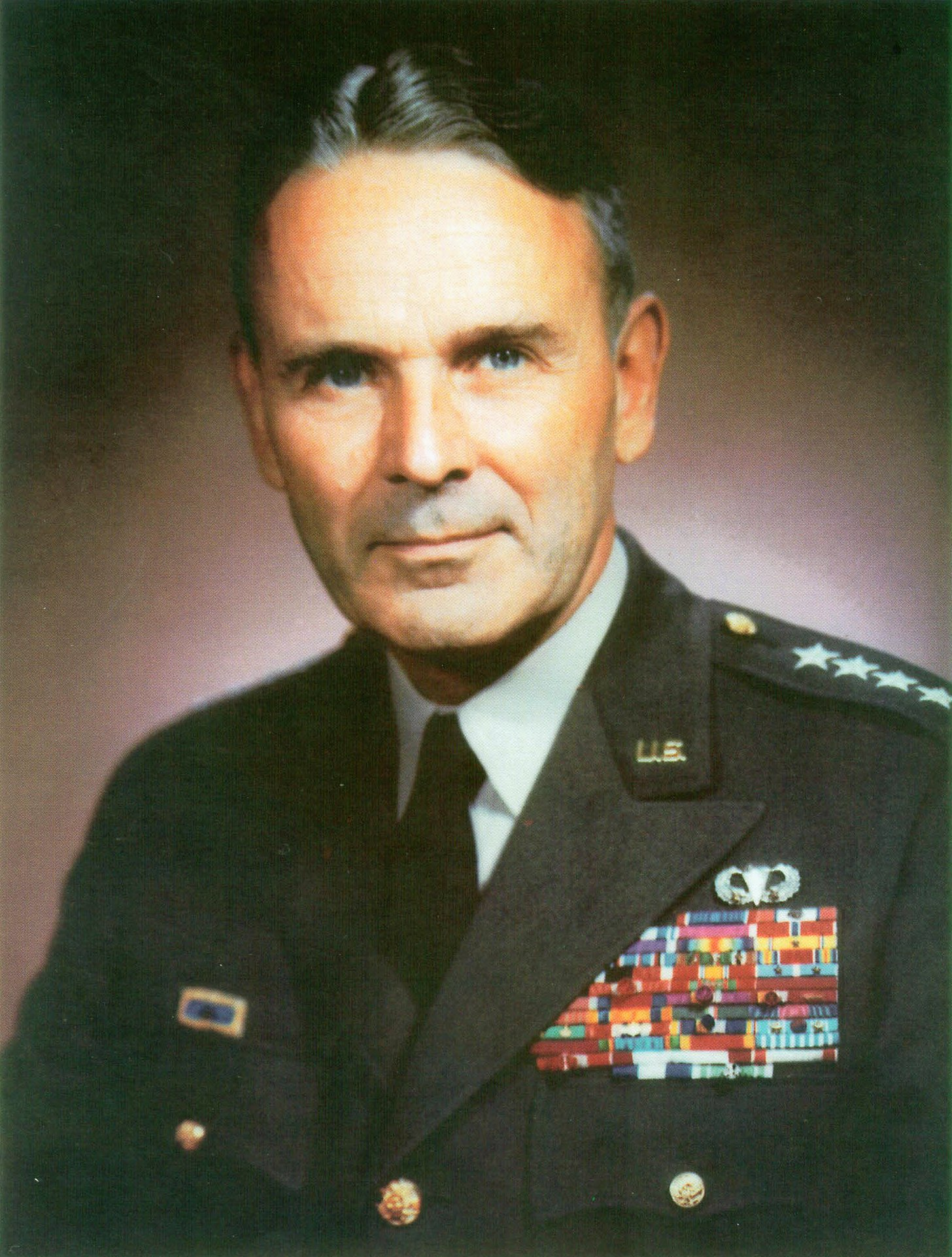
Ambassador Maxwell Taylor

1 July

General Maxwell Taylor was appointed as the U.S. Ambassador to South Vietnam, replacing Henry Cabot Lodge Jr.

The VC 93rd Battalion ambushed an ARVN convoy on the Mang Yang Pass in Bình Định Province killing 27 ARVN, wounding 30, destroying nine trucks and capturing 36 weapons. A further nine ARVN were missing.

3 July

MACV sent a request to Admiral U. S. Grant Sharp Jr., Commander-in-Chief, Pacific for authorization of a patrol of the Gulf of Tonkin to get information about North Vietnam's coastal defense. Admiral Sharp would dispatch the destroyer USS Maddox to the area.

4 July

The VC 407th Sapper Battalion and the 200th Artillery Battalion attacked Polei Krong Camp, in an action apparently timed to coincide with the American 4 July holiday, killing 49 Civilian Irregular Defense Group (CIDG) troops, wounding 46 and with 67 missing. The VC seized two mortars, five machine guns and more than 170 small arms. The VC left 18 dead, a further 27 were found in a grave nearby from a grave nearby. Villagers reported that the VC had buried 130 fighters in several mass graves.

5–6 July

The Battle of Nam Dong was fought when the VC attacked the Nam Dong CIDG camp in an attempt to overrun it. The VC lost 62 killed, the ARVN 57 killed, the U.S. two killed and Australian Warrant Officer Class Two Kevin Conway was killed, the first Australian battle casualty of the war.

8 July

U Thant, Secretary General of the United Nations said at a press conference that "the only sensible solution" to the war in South Vietnam was to reconvene the Geneva Conference of 1954 to negotiate peace in Southeast Asia. The U.S. rejected his proposal. President Johnson later said, "We do not believe in conferences called to ratify terror."

The U.S. Department of Defense announced that American casualties in South Vietnam had risen to 1387 "since American forces became fully involved in the jungle war in 1961", a number broken down as "152 killed in action, 96 deaths not related to combat, 971 wounded in action, 151 non-battle injuries and 17 missing in action."

10-11 July

The ARVN 5th and 7th Divisions launched an operation to clear two VC battalions from the heavily forested border of Hau Nghia and Long An Provinces. The 5th Division thrust southward from Duc Hoa along the Vàm Cỏ Đông River, while the 7th Division drove north from Bến Lức. The object was to trap and destroy the VC between them. Late in the day, the two VC battalions pinned the 30th Ranger Battalion against the banks of the Varic Oriental River. The rangers received air support throughout the night and at 06:30 on 11 July, 24 US Army helicopters delivered an infantry battalion, but the VC already had withdrawn. ARVN losses were nine killed and 27 wounded, US losses were two killed and three wounded. The allies killed 68 VC and captured 73 suspects.

10-12 July

A large VC force attacked the Popular Forces Vinh Cheo outpost in Chương Thiện Province and then ambushed the relief column with at least 18 ARVN killed and 19 missing. A subsequent ARVN operation in the area claimed to have killed 68 VC and captured 73 suspects for the loss of nine ARVN and two U.S.

11 July

The New York Times published a petition signed by more than 5,000 American academics urging that the U.S. government work toward the neutralization of South Vietnam. The spokesman for the group Hans J. Morgenthau said that escalation of the war was not the answer.

13 July

The VC ambushed an ARVN Ranger convoy on Highway 13 in Bình Long Province 45 miles (72 km) north of Saigon as they moved to support another Ranger unit. Sixteen Rangers and three U.S. advisers were killed and 19 Rangers were missing.

13-14 July

Three VC companies attacked Ngu Lac post in Vinh Binh Province on the afternoon of 13 July. The ARVN took 16 hours to amass 1,500 troops and an M113 troop, which swept south from Cau Ngang and engaged the VC 10km later at 16:30 on 14 July. Approximately 100 VC were killed, while ARVN losses were 17 dead and 48 wounded.

16 July

The ARVN killed over 100 VC in Vĩnh Bình Province for the loss of 17 killed.

19 July

At a rally in Saigon, Khánh called for expanding the war into North Vietnam. Before a crowd of 100,000 people, Khanh led the rallying cry "Bac thien!" ("To the North!") and called on volunteers to not only defend South Vietnam, but to liberate North Vietnam.

20 July

Three VC companies from the 261st, 263rd, and 514th Battalions attacked Cái Bè killing 12 Popular Force soldiers, ten women and 30 children. The ARVN deployed five battalions to engage the VC and the 6th and 8th Airborne Battalions saw intense fighting, losing 13 killed and 52 wounded. VC losses were 46 killed and 12 captured.

22 July

The VC ambushed the ARVN 1st Battalion, 31st Infantry convoy in Chương Thiện Province as they moved through an area of paddy fields and mangrove swamps from Vi Thanh to relieve the outpost at Xang Cut. ARVN losses were 41 killed, 55 wounded and 31 missing, while US losses were one missing and one wounded. Khanh described the incident as "a day of shame."

The VC attacked An Nhon Tay post in Hậu Nghĩa province. About 3km northeast of Trung Lap, the VC ambushed the relief force consisting of the 30th Ranger Battalion, two companies from the 44th Rangers, and two troops of M113s. The fight lasted all day, at 20:00, a final assault recovered the damaged M113s, but the allies were not able to capture the VC trenches. The VC disappeared during the night. The ARVN lost 16 dead, 32 wounded, and five missing, along with three light machine guns, two automatic rifles, and 15 individual weapons. The allies captured a recoilless rifle and estimated they had killed up to 80 VC.

23 July

In a speech in the Senate, Senator Frank Church said he could not understand how "25,000 hardcore Viet Cong" could "thwart the American-backed South Vietnamese government." The VC were being supplied by men with packs on their back traversing jungle trails, while the U.S. was sending shiploads of equipment and hundreds of millions of dollars to South Vietnam every year. Church also opposed widening the war by bombing North Vietnam. "Expanding the war is not getting out ... It is getting further in." This was Church's first public declaration of concern about the trajectory of the war.

The VC ambushed a CIDG column that was trying to open the road between the Ban Me Thuot and Buon Brieng special forces camps in Darlac Province. The VC killed one US Special Forces soldier and 59 CIDG soldiers and wounded 17 and captured more than 80 weapons.

23 July-2 August

The ARVN 23rd Division conducted Operation Vi Dan 109 in Phú Yên province resulting in 51 VC killed, two captured and 17 weapons captured for the loss of one ARVN killed.

24–29 July

Operation Triangle was conducted by the Royal Lao Army and Forces Armées Neutralistes to capture the intersection of Routes 7 and 13, trap a Pathet Lao force and gain access to the Plain of Jars. The operation was a partial success with large amounts of material captured, but the Pathet Lao successfully evacuated and still controlled access to the Plain.

25 July

Hanoi Radio charged in a broadcast that U.S. Navy ships had fired upon North Vietnamese fishing craft, making the first assertion of United States aggression against North Vietnam.

27 July

The U.S. announces that a further 5,000 advisers will be sent to South Vietnam.

28-30 July

The VC attacked several posts 10km north of Bến Cát, Binh Duong Province. The reaction force had moved just 1km north of Bến Cát when the VC opened fire, knocking out two tanks and injuring a third of the troops, and the ARVN hastily retired to the town. At 05:30 on the 30th, two VC battalions ambushed the 1st Battalion, 8th Infantry, as it moved from Bến Súc to Bến Cát. The soldiers broke and ran into flooded rice paddies, where they came under intense machine-gun fire. The unit was saved from annihilation by US air support. Over the three days the allies had lost 45 dead (including one US adviser), 59 wounded, 14 missing, and 52 weapons lost.

29 July

Cambodia accuses South Vietnam and the U.S. of using chemical weapons and killing 76 Cambodian villagers. The U.S. and South Vietnam deny the accusations.

30 July

Khánh advocated an attack on North Vietnam by the U.S. and South Vietnam. The British Embassy in Saigon reported that if Khánh's demands for an attack were not met, he might resign the premiership or attempt to make a peace agreement with the VC. The Saigon Daily News said that, without an attack on the North, neutralism for South Vietnam would become a reality.

Nasty patrol boats of the Republic of Vietnam Navy moved into the Gulf of Tonkin on an Operation 34A mission, and attacked a North Vietnamese radar station on Hòn Mê island.

== August ==
Former Vice President Nixon published an article in the Reader's Digest titled "Needed in Vietnam: The Will to Win." Nixon accused the Johnson administration of compromise, weakness, and inconsistency. He said that the U.S. should use its military power "to win this crucial war—and win it decisively." In public statements Nixon said that the U.S. should "take a tougher line toward Communism in Asia" and expand the war to North Vietnam and Laos.

2 August

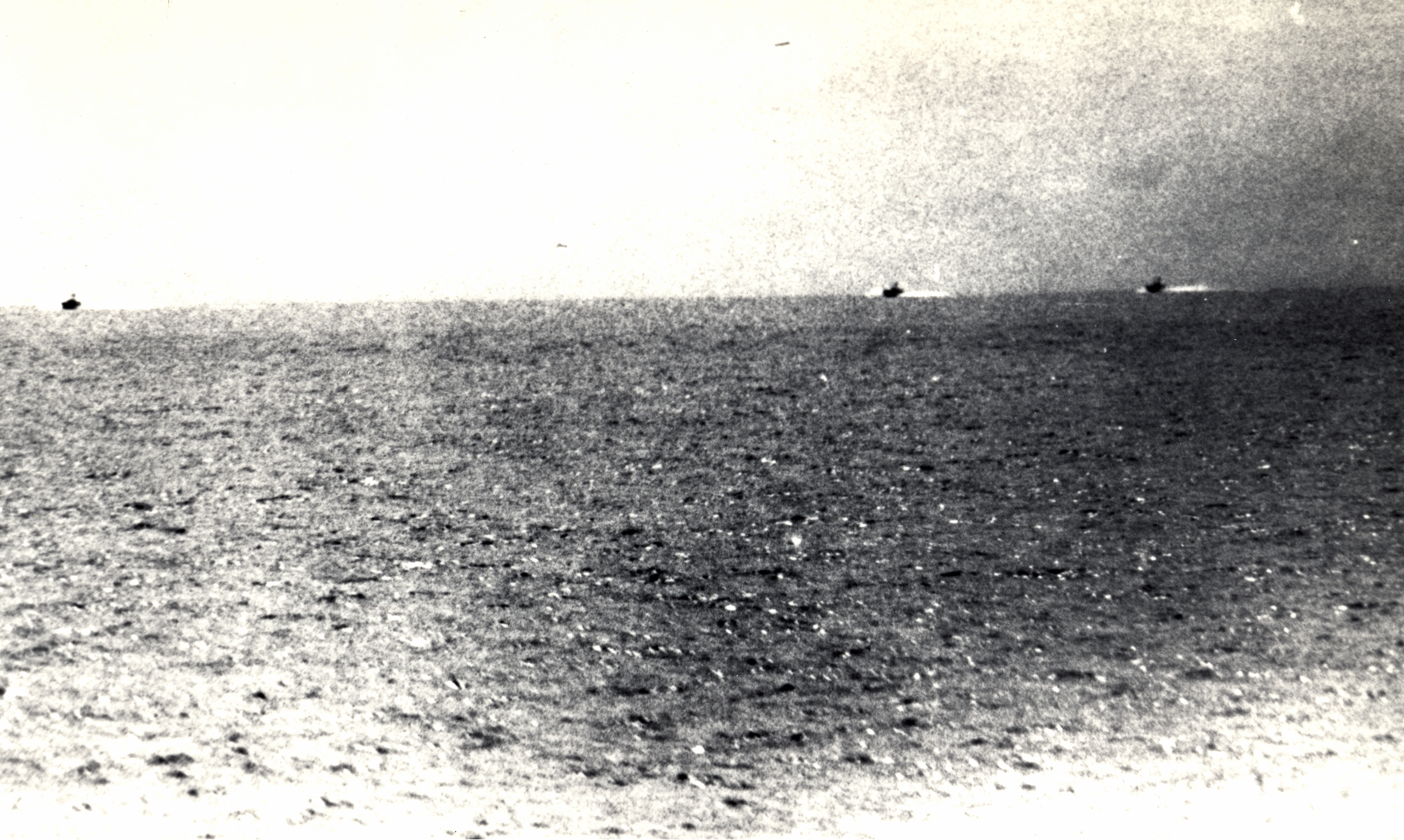
Photo taken from USS Maddox showing three North Vietnamese motor torpedo boats

The first Gulf of Tonkin incident occurred in territorial waters off the coast of North Vietnam. The destroyer USS Maddox, performing a DESOTO patrol, was engaged by three Vietnam People's Navy P 4-class torpedo boats of the 135th Torpedo Squadron. In the ensuing sea battle, the Maddox expended over 280 3" and 5" shells, and four U.S. Navy F-8 Crusader jets strafed the North Vietnamese. There was damage to one US aircraft, one 14.5mm hit on the destroyer, 3 damaged torpedo boats, 4 North Vietnamese sailors killed and 6 wounded, with no US casualties. Although the U.S. claimed that the Maddox was engaged in peaceful surveillance, on nearby islands the Republic of Vietnam Navy were conducting Operation 34A guerrilla raids using Nasty-class patrol boats.

4 August

U.S. destroyers USS Maddox and USS Turner Joy reported that they were under fire, in a second Tonkin Gulf incident. Evidence suggests, however, that no actual attack took place. President Johnson informed Congressional leaders that he was ordering retaliatory air strikes on North Vietnam from U.S. aircraft carriers stationed off shore of Vietnam. Among the Congressional leaders, only Senator Mike Mansfield disagreed with the retaliation.

In Laos General Phoumi Nosavan ordered a Royal Lao Army Training Battalion commanded by his bodyguard Major Boua in an attempted coup in Vientiane. The coup was crushed by troops loyal to General Kouprasith Abhay.

5 August

China ordered its military forces near the border with North Vietnam to be in a state of readiness and to "be ready to cope with any possible sudden attack" by the United States.

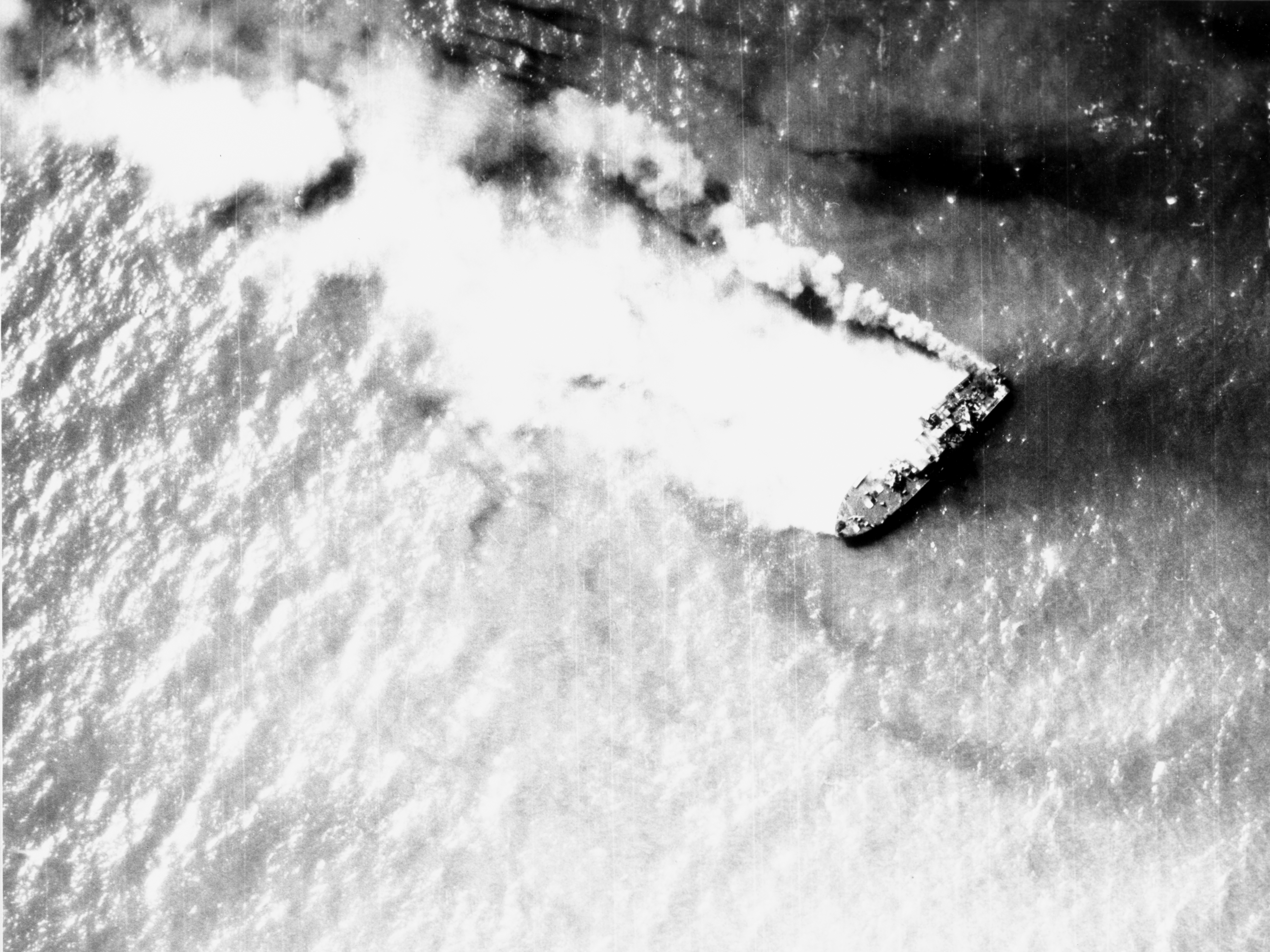
A Vietnam People's Navy gunboat on fire after a U.S. Navy air attack

In retaliation for the Tonkin Gulf Incident, Operation Pierce Arrow consisted of 64 strike sorties of aircraft from the aircraft carriers USS Ticonderoga and USS Constellation against the torpedo boat bases of Hon Gai, Loc Chao, Quảng Khê and Phuc Loi and the oil storage depot at Vinh. The U.S. lost two aircraft to anti-aircraft fire, Lieutenant Richard Sather was killed in his A-1 Skyraider while Lieutenant (junior grade) Everett Alvarez's A-4 Skyhawk was shot down and he became the first U.S. Navy Prisoner of War being held until 12 February 1973.

The Vietnam Era began for purposes of federal law pertaining to members of the United States Armed Forces, which defines the period of American involvement in the war as "the period beginning on August 5, 1964, and ending on March 27, 1973".

6 August

The British Consul General in Hanoi cabled London that the only "plausible explanation" for the Tonkin Gulf incident "seems to be that it was a deliberate attempt by the Americans to provoke the North Vietnamese into hostile reaction."

China said about the Tonkin Gulf Incident that "Aggression by the United States against the Democratic Republic of Vietnam (North Vietnam) means aggression against China. China will not stand idly by without lending a helping hand." China immediately gave North Vietnam 51 MiG fighter planes, offered training to VPAF pilots, built airports in southern China to serve as sanctuaries for VPAF planes and provided weapons for the VC.

The VPAF 921st Sao Dao Squadron, arrived in North Vietnam after training at the Mengzi airfield, Yunnan province, China bringing 36 MiG-17 and MiG-19 fighters to Phúc Yên Air Base near Hanoi.

7 August

Khánh declared a state of emergency and suspended the constitution in South Vietnam. This triggered large demonstrations by Buddhists and students in Saigon.

9 August

Two VC battalions attacked the command post of the 2nd Battalion, 4th Infantry, which was performing pacification operations around Thanh My in southern Quảng Tín province. The task force commander, Lieutenant colonel Nhan, personally led the relief force, which consisted of a rifle company and a troop of M114 armored fighting vehicles. The advance continued even after a recoilless rifle knocked out the command M114, with South Vietnamese artillery and US Army helicopter gunships hitting the flanking hills. After rockets started a grass fire among the VC positions, the VC broke and ran with the M114s in pursuit. The allies killed 74 VC.

10 August

The U.S. Congress voted on the Gulf of Tonkin Resolution authorizing the President "to take all necessary steps, including the use of armed force, to assist any member or protocol state of the Southeast Asia Collective Defense Treaty requesting assistance in defense of its freedom". The unanimous affirmative vote in the House of Representatives was 416–0. The Senate conferred its approval by a vote of 88–2. Some members expressed misgivings about the measure, but in the end, only Democratic Senators Wayne Morse of Oregon and Ernest Gruening of Alaska cast opposing votes.

China warned that it would "without hesitation ... resolutely support the Vietnamese people's just war against U.S. aggressors", though not committing to direct military intervention. American strategy during the war would be set when the Beijing government "informed Washington privately that it would not go beyond material aid provided that the United States did not invade North Vietnam with ground forces", which would be considered a threat to China's frontier.

After intelligence reported that a VC company was located 15km west of Mỹ Tho, the ARVN deployed four battalions (one airborne, one infantry, and two ranger) and an M113 troop. All units made contact, and an airstrike helped to kill 42 VC. The VC evacuated an estimated 70 more casualties. ARVN losses were 16 dead and 41 wounded.

12-15 August

An ARVN operation using nine battalions in an attempt to encircle 2,500 VC 12km west of Bến Cát achieved scant results with 17 VC killed and four captured for ARVN losses of three dead and 20 wounded and US losses of one dead and two wounded.

13 August

Chinese leader Mao Zedong told North Vietnamese leader Lê Duẩn that he did not believe that the American provocation in the Tonkin Gulf meant war and that none of the Americans, the North Vietnamese, nor the Chinese wanted war. Therefore, "because no one wants to fight a war, there will be no war."

Robert Thompson, counterinsurgency expert and head of the British Advisory Mission to South Vietnam, wrote to his government in London. "Defeat by the Viet Cong, through subversion and increased guerrilla activity is inevitable, and this prospect will become gradually more apparent over the next few months. The U.S., he said, should seek negotiations with North Vietnam or they "could be forced to insert combat troops in some strength."

15 August

After a return visit to North Vietnam, Canadian diplomat J. Blair Seaborn reported to Ottawa and Washington. He offered American terms to North Vietnam's Prime Minister Phạm Văn Đồng: cease support for the VC and receive financial benefits from the United States; continue support and suffer the consequences. Đồng was furious. He said that the United States carried "the war to the North in order to find a way out of the impasse in the South" and added that "Johnson worries ... about the coming electoral battle in which it is necessary to outbid the Republican candidate." Đồng expressed support for negotiations in Geneva.

Westmoreland asked for three US antiaircraft battalions (two Army and one Marine), two combat brigades (one Army and one Marine), and support personnel to defend Bien Hoa, Danang and Tan Son Nhut air bases. The Joint Chiefs rejected all but a single Marine antiaircraft battalion.

15-17 August

The VC attacked the adjacent outposts of Hòa Mỹ and Hiệp Hưng in Phụng Hiệp district to lure relief forces into an ambush. The allies anticipated the plan and bombed the ambush site throughout the day. On the night of the 16th, the VC charged a ranger battalion, breaking off when hit by howitzers at Phung Hiep. The VC then resumed their assaults on the two outposts, but both held with the help of air support. The allies found ten bodies after the VC withdrew on 17 July, but the ARVN estimated they had killed nearly 300. ARVN losses were 36 dead and 76 wounded.

16 August

Khánh was named as the nation's new president, replacing figurehead chief of state Minh. Under a new constitution, drafted with the assistance of the U.S. Embassy, a 62-member revolutionary council had the right to veto Khánh's decisions.

19 August

The ARVN 23rd Division sent two infantry battalions, one ranger company, two Regional Forces companies and an armored cavalry troop into Phu Yen's Giang River Valley to look for an estimated 500 VC. The ARVN killed 56 VC and estimated it had inflicted 74 more casualties, while capturing nine prisoners and three weapons. ARVN losses were 18 killed and 45 wounded.

20 August

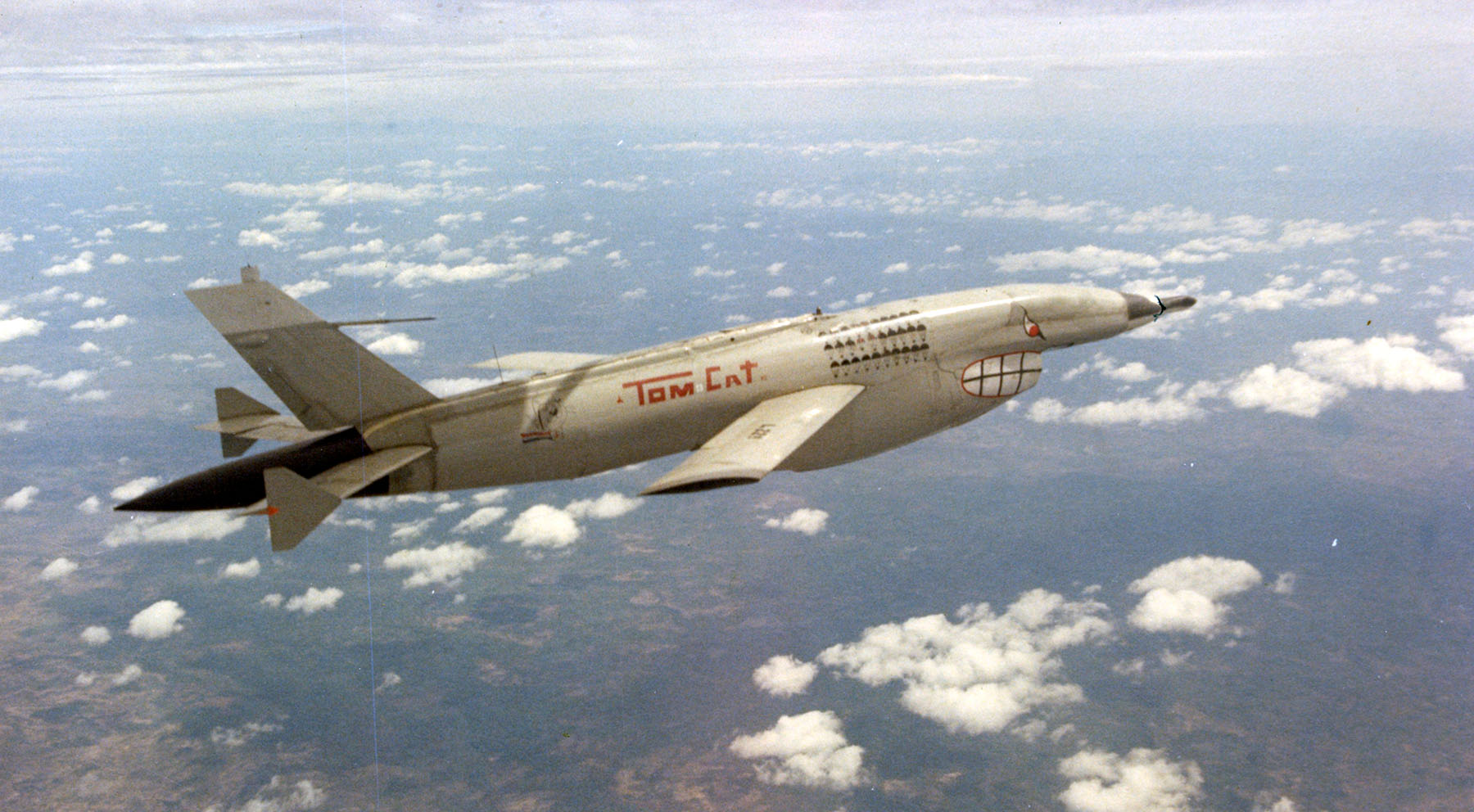
AQM-34 in flight

The USAF began the first of 3,435 unmanned drone reconnaissance missions during the war, using the Ryan AQM-34 Lightning Bug series. The first of the Lightning Bugs flew a mission in Chinese airspace, while others flew over locations in Southeast Asia. The drones could gather photographic, electronic, and communication intelligence, as well as to serve as decoys or to drop leaflets.

The ARVN 25th Division launched Operation Quyet Thang 505 to clear Binh Dinh's An Lão district, An Lao valley. For 11 days, four battalions and four Regional Forces companies backed by mechanized and artillery units prowled the valley, with the VC largely evading contact. The ARVN killed 55 VC, captured eight prisoners and six firearms for the loss of six dead and 14 wounded.

The VC overran Phu Tuc post in Kiến Hòa Province killing seven, wounding 15, and capturing the rest of the post's 36-man garrison and burning the post. An ARVN reaction force comprising 360 soldiers from the 41st Ranger Battalion and the 3rd Battalion, 12th Infantry arrived too late. As they withdrew, the VC 514th Battalion attacked the column repeatedly for an hour. ARVN losses were 85 killed, 60 wounded, 91 missing and 122 weapons lost. All four American advisers were killed. Westmoreland was dismayed because no local South Vietnamese had informed the ARVN that the VC were setting up the ambush.

U.S. Navy Lieutenant Charles F. Klusmann, who had been held captive by the Pathet Lao since 6 June, managed to escape his captors after he and five Laotian and Thai prisoners of war were able to tunnel under the wall of the compound and sneak past sentries. He and one of the five POWs were able to reach safety at Bouam Long. Klusmann would be one of only two U.S. Navy aviators to successfully escape captivity during the war.

21-25 August

Buddhists and students protest against the Khánh government.

21-26 August

An ARVN operation in Binh Dinh Province killed 92 VC, wounded one, and captured 52. Fourteen prisoners reportedly committed suicide. ARVN losses were nine killed and 18 wounded.

22 August

Seven ARVN battalions, two armored cavalry troops, and naval forces tried to encircle the VC in Kien Hoa province's Ham Long District. In the ensuing battle, 7th Division artillery fired 3,222 rounds, and the RVNAF flew 10 fighter-bomber sorties. The allies killed 98 VC and captured 43 prisoners and 37 weapons. Agents reported that the VC buried another 200 dead and evacuated 300 wounded. ARVN losses were 17 killed and 45 wounded.

25 August

A bomb exploded in Room 514 of the Caravelle Hotel, Saigon damaging nine rooms but causing no fatalities on a floor mainly occupied by foreign journalists.

25-29 August

Faced with large protests, Khánh abruptly resigned as Prime Minister of South Vietnam on 25 August. He returned to power as part of a triumvirate with Duong Van Minh and Tran Thien Khiem on 27 August. With demonstrations against the Khánh government and the U.S. continuing, Buddhist leader Thich Tri Quang told U.S. Embassy officials in Saigon that "the Buddhists could not accept government by Christians" and that the Buddhists might withdraw from the war, "leaving Catholics aided by Americans to fight the Communists." On 27 August ARVN troops opened fire on a crowd of 3,000 unarmed Roman Catholic demonstrators who were protesting outside of the national military headquarters. On 29 August Khánh fled Saigon to take refuge in Da Lat. In Saigon and other cities, street fighting among Roman Catholics, Buddhists, and students broke out. The VC applauded the struggle against the "confused puppet government" Nguyen Xuan Oanh was appointed as Prime Minister and charged with forming a caretaker government until domestic unrest and rioting could be brought under control.

31 August

Ambassador Taylor journeyed to Dalat and persuaded Khánh to return to Saigon to resume leadership of the government. The CIA analyzed the situation. "War weariness and a desire for a quick solution to the long struggle against the Viet Cong may be an important factor underlying the current agitation ... The confused situation is extremely vulnerable to exploitation by the Communists and by the proponents of a negotiated settlement." Khánh, however, was increasingly coming under the influence of militant Buddhists, led by Thích Trí Quang, who opposed foreign influences such as the United States and Catholicism.

== September ==
1 September

Hop Tac a major pacification operation in III Corps officially commenced.

3-5 September

Ove 500 VC overran four hamlets in Nghĩa Hành district, Quảng Ngãi Province. In reaction, the ARVN deployed three Regional Forces companies and five Popular Forces platoons north and south of the area, while the 1st Battalion, 45th Infantry, backed by a scout company and a platoon each of M113s and 105mm howitzers, advanced from east to west. The attack bogged down as troops tried to cross 700 meters of open ground. As reinforcements arrived, the VC withdrew into the northern blocking force where another fight occurred. The VC lost 79 killed and two captured, one 57mm recoilless rifle, three automatic rifles, and 18 other weapons. ARVN losses were 14 killed and 27 wounded.

4 September

Assistant Secretary of Defense John McNaughton recommended to his superior, Robert McNamara, that, given the chaotic state of South Vietnam, the U.S. consider sending a significant number of combat troops to South Vietnam and provoke actions to justify an air war against North Vietnam. Other advisers of Johnson were making similar proposals.

5 September

During an ARVN 7th Division operation in Dinh Tuong province, entrenched VC hit three of five UH–1B gunships from the 120th Aviation Company. The gunships in turn killed 60 VC and wounded an estimated 40 more, while 34 VC surrendered.

A VC battalion attacked the Vĩnh Xương and Tan An posts along the Cambodian border in An Giang Province. RVNAF A-1s engaged VC boats on the Mekong River throughout the afternoon, the boats withdrawing into Cambodia whenever they were hard-pressed. Eventually, Cambodian MiG-17 fighters chased off the A-1s, following them 13km into South Vietnam. The South Vietnamese lost 103 dead, 296 wounded, 67 prisoners and 194 weapons in the fighting. The VC lost 164 dead, 29 prisoners and 60 weapons.

6 September

Ambassador Taylor in Saigon reported to the Department of State in Washington that in South Vietnam only "the emergence of an exceptional leader could improve the situation." He proposed that the U.S. assume "increased responsibility" for the outcome of the war because "The consequences of this defeat in the rest of Asia, Africa, and Latin America would be disastrous."

The 7th Airborne Battalion entered a heavily fortified base near Phu Hoa, Binh Duong Province. The VC ambushed the paratroopers, then assaulted them, only to be repulsed. The paratroopers launched three successive counterattacks, none of which succeeded. By the end of the fight the airborne had lost seven killed and 39 wounded, VC losses were 30 killed.

8 September

A triumvirate of generals to lead South Vietnam until a civilian government could be permitted, was installed by the Military Revolutionary Council (MRC) under American pressure. The council was headed by Duong Van Minh and included Nguyen Khanh and Tran Thien Khiem.

9 September

Johnson held his first meeting since the Gulf of Tonkin incident with Taylor and with national security advisers and raised the question of "whether anyone doubted Vietnam was worth the effort" of going to war; at the time, everyone present agreed that it was necessary to fight in order to protect the credibility of the United States worldwide. According to notes taken of the meeting, Taylor said that the U.S. "could not afford to let Hanoi win, in terms of our overall position in the area and in the world". General Earle Wheeler, the new Chairman of the Joint Chiefs of Staff, said that the joint chiefs agreed "that if we should lose in South Vietnam, we would lose Southeast Asia", after which "country after country on the periphery would give way and look toward Communist China as the rising power of the area.".

10 September

Johnson approved National Security Action Memorandum 314 which authorized the resumption of naval patrols in the Tonkin Gulf and clandestine operations against North Vietnam under Operation 34A, limited actions in Laos, retaliatory actions if U.S. personnel were attacked, and continued economic aid to South Vietnam.

13 September

Prompted by Khánh's concessions to the Buddhists, Generals Dương Văn Đức and Lam Van Phat attempted a coup d'état. Air Force Commander Nguyễn Cao Kỳ and Generals Nguyen Chanh Thi and Nguyễn Văn Thiệu helped Khánh put down the coup. These three officers were the most prominent of the Young Turks, who gained increasing power in Saigon junta politics.

14 September

The VC 95th Battalion hit a company of the 51st Infantry in the Mộ Đức district about 20km south of Quang Ngai City. The VC then entered Duc Son village to gather rice. The province chief assembled a mixed force approximating two battalions and two M113 platoons. After establishing blocking positions, he launched a two-pronged attack as artillery hit egress routes. The US adviser saw three VC bodies, but accepted ARVN claims that the attack killed 80 VC. The ARVN also captured two prisoners, 12 individual weapons, a 57mm recoilless rifle, a .30-caliber machine gun, and a 60mm mortar. Reports of ARVN losses varied, with the highest being three killed, 15 wounded, and ten missing.

15 September

UN Secretary General U Thant secured agreement from North Vietnam to engage in exploratory talks with the United States. He passed that information to the U.S.'s UN Ambassador Adlai Stevenson who was "favorably surprised" and conveyed the news to Secretary of State Rusk. The U.S. did not respond to U Thant's invitation for talks and Stevenson was later told that President Johnson was too busy with the election to respond. It is unclear whether Thant's invitation for talks was ever shared with Johnson.

18 September

The USS Morton and the USS Richard S. Edwards detected radar signals and concluded that an attack from North Vietnamese patrol boats was imminent. The destroyers fired multiple shells, but, as with the Turner Joy incident, were ultimately unable to locate any enemy vessels.

Several hundred VC ambushed five Regional Forces companies near the village of Sou Hum Cha, 12km northwest of Tri Tôn. Two of the companies were caught in a trap sprung 5km from the border, and the other three retreated. The ARVN lost 23 dead, 41 wounded, 18 missing, a 60mm mortar, three automatic rifles, and 64 other weapons. The allies estimated that 100 VC casualties had been inflicted, mostly by air support.

19 September

A Montagnard revolt broke out in South Vietnam, near the Central Highland city of Ban Me Thuot. U.S. Special Forces soldiers had been training Montagnard soldiers under the CIDG program. The Montagnards and United Front for the Liberation of Oppressed Races (FULRO) activists launched attacks against South Vietnamese Special Forces soldiers and militiamen, killing several dozen and capturing hundreds. About 2,000 Montagnards faced off against an ARVN division. Several U.S. soldiers were taken hostage, while other U.S. Special Forces personnel served as intermediaries between the ARVN and the Montagnards.

20 September

During Operation Lam Son 129 elements of the ARVN 2nd Battalion, 1st Infantry engaged two VC companies near the village of Le Xuyen, about 10km from Quang Tri City. Two platoons of M113s attacked from the south and infantry blocked the VC's escape to the north. After an airstrike in which the VC shot down an RVNAF A–1H, they tried to withdraw eastward into rice paddies inundated with waist-deep water. The M113s pursued them and the ARVN killed 77 VC and captured 11 along with three light machine guns and 73 individual weapons. ARVN losses were one dead and seven wounded. At least one of the captives was a North Vietnamese who had just arrived in South Vietnam four days earlier. The Saigon government claimed both companies were elements of the PAVN, a statement MACV denied.

23 September

The VC attacked the Catholic hamlet of Long Phu, 8km from Bến Tre, having previously attacked it more than 40 times in the preceding year. The defenders repelled the assault killing 22 VC, with an estimated 72 further casualties having been removed; the VC left behind 26 weapons. The defenders had lost five dead and four wounded. The hamlet was subsequently evacuated.

25 September

Johnson said "There are those that say you ought to go north and drop bombs, to try to wipe out the supply lines, and they think that would escalate the war. We don't want our American boys to do the fighting for Asian boys."

26 September

Khánh and the senior officers in his military junta created a semblance of civilian rule by forming the High National Council (HNC), an appointed advisory body akin to a legislature. This came after lobbying by American officials, led by Ambassador Maxwell Taylor, as they placed great value in the appearance of civilian legitimacy, which they saw as vital to building a popular base for any government.

The 43rd Ranger Battalion chased a VC force into a fortified pagoda 5km southeast of Cầu Kè, Vinh Binh Province. Two companies were pinned down in flooded paddies and then the remainder of the battalion was also pinned down. Air support was called in and the USAF made ten sorties, losing one A–1E Skyraider. The VC disengaged at midnight. ARVN losses were nine dead and 27 wounded. One US advisor was killed. VC losses were 20 killed and seven weapons captured, with the VC reportedly carrying off 40 more casualties.

27 September

The High National Council elected Phan Khắc Sửu as its chairman and Tran Van Huong as Prime Minister. The job of the council was to draft a new constitution. The U.S. had urged the creation of the council to reduce the visibility of the South Vietnamese military in the government. Prime Minister Huong repressed Buddhist demonstrations in the months ahead.

U.S. Army troops rescued 60 South Vietnamese hostages and seized the main camp of the Montagnard rebels operating at Buon Sar Pa near South Vietnam's frontier with Cambodia. The Americans flew in on 50 helicopters from the Ban Me Thuot East Airfield and picked up the hostages, then aided in placing the 470 rebels on a convoy of trucks.

28 September

After negotiations, the last of the Montagnards in revolt released their prisoners. U.S. Special Forces remained with the Montagnards to maintain calm. The South Vietnamese government agreed to meet with the Montagnards to discuss their grievances. A few days later, a Montagnard congress demanded more autonomy for the Montagnards, including a 50,000 man Montagnard army trained by U.S. Special Forces rather than South Vietnamese or the U.S. Military Advisory Assistance Group (MAAG). MACV was displeased that the Montagnard showed more loyalty to the U.S. Special Forces than to South Vietnam.

== October ==
3 October

The ARVN killed 59 VC and captured 36 for the loss of two killed in An Xuyên Province.

3-5 October

The ARVN 2nd Battalion, 33rd Infantry launched Operation Dan Chi in An Xuyên province. As the troops riding M113s advanced on the hamlet of Tan Duc they flushed a VC company out into the open. Twelve US helicopters landed 56 rangers to engage an estimated 150 VC. The VC fought the rangers, who were supported US Army gunships, until nightfall when the VC withdrew. The allies found 46 VC dead and took 37 prisoners and captured 24 weapons. The rangers suffered two wounded. The operation continued for another two days, generating little contact.

4 October

Over 1,000 VC ambushed two ARVN 8th Infantry battalions as they were moving between the hamlets Phu Hoa Dong and Ap Dong Nhut, Bình Dương Province, killing 32 and one U.S. adviser, with 53 wounded, 13 missing and 37 weapons lost. The allies found 13 VC dead and estimated that the VC had lost 80 dead and one hundred wounded, mostly from airstrikes.

The VC forced civilians into a Regional Forces ambush site in Quang Ngai and then fired on the Regional Forces troops making them return fire and kill 16 civilians and wound 17.

5 October

George Ball, Undersecretary of State, wrote a lengthy memo dissenting from the direction of U.S. policy on Vietnam. He said the U.S. should tell South Vietnamese leaders the U.S. will continue support "only if they achieve a unity of purpose ... and create a government free from factionalism and capable of carrying on the affairs of the country." He continued, "We have spent months of concentrated effort trying to devise ways and means to advance the present policy of winning the war ... But we have given almost no attention to the possible political means of finding a way out without further enlargement of the war." The memo was read and responded to by Johnson's top advisers on Vietnam—but apparently was never shown to the President.

Mao Zedong received a delegation of officials from North Vietnam, including its Prime Minister, Phạm Văn Đồng, and predicted that the U.S. effort could be defeated. Noting that the U.S. had 18 army divisions and that it could only spare three in Asia, Mao concluded that it was "impossible for the United States to send many troops to South Vietnam." Historian Michael Lind would write nearly 50 years later, "The significance of these conversations can hardly be exaggerated. We now know that the nightmare of American strategists had come true in the summer and fall of 1964."

The 23rd Ranger Battalion and other units engaged a VC battalion near Tuy Hoa. ARVN losses were one killed and three wounded. VC losses were 42 killed, three captured and 11 weapons captured.

5-6 October

The VC infiltrated two hamlets in Binh Dinh, killing 11 Popular Forces soldiers, wounding 22, and capturing 76 weapons.

6-7 October

Over 800 VC in two battalions and a local force company attacked Luong Hoa, 24km southwest of Saigon at night. The ARVN responded by sending the 1st Battalion, 46th Infantry, and the 30th Ranger Battalion. They chose to approach the hamlet using the most obvious, and therefore the most likely ambushed, route. The 1/46th walked into an L-shaped ambush and the rangers broke and left the field. The VC attacked the 1/46th four times before starting to withdraw at 11:00 pursued by helicopter gunships and A-1s. ARVN losses were 31 dead, 53 wounded and 15 missing. US losses were five killed in a downed helicopter, and one wounded. The VC left 26 bodies and MACV estimated the allies had inflicted another 100 casualties.

7 October

The VC shot down a U.S. UH-1B helicopter over Hậu Nghĩa Province killing all six on board, including five Americans.

Trần Thiện Khiêm left Saigon ostensibly on a goodwill tour but was actually forced into exile for this role in the September coup attempt.

8 October

In the midst of a Presidential campaign, The New York Times excoriated Republican candidate Barry Goldwater for wanting "to convert an Asian war into an American war" in South Vietnam. Goldwater had accused Johnson of being indecisive and insufficiently aggressive in combating the spread of communism.

11 October

The North Vietnamese Central Military Commission ordered the VC and PAVN to jointly "annihilate a part of the enemy's main force units" in South Vietnam between December 1964 and March 1965. Prior to this announcement, PAVN units had not participated in the war in South Vietnam.

The ARVN 14th Infantry pushed a VC company into a confined area in Vinh Binh province where it was hit by aircraft and artillery. The ARVN commander refused an order from his superior to advance to block the VC escape. The operation continued into the following day, with the ARVN losing four dead and 16 wounded and the VC losing 21 dead, one prisoner, and three weapons.

Four VC battalions attacked two New Rural Life hamlets in Tay Ninh Province, 48km northwest of Saigon. The VC penetrated Phouc Thanh, which a rifle company and the headquarters of the ARVN 1st Battalion, 9th Infantry, defended. The VC captured a 57mm recoilless rifle and then withdrew. Twenty minutes later, they returned. This time the defenders repulsed the attack with the assistance of nearby artillery. At Ap Chanh, the VC dispersed two infantry companies from the 1/9th Infantry. The ARVN reoccupied the hamlet after dawn. The 9th Infantry lost 30 dead, 34 wounded, 29 missing, a recoilless rifle, and 43 other weapons lost. The VC left 64 bodies, 12 prisoners, and 17 weapons, with the allies estimating that the ARVN had caused another 100 casualties. Three civilians died in the fighting and five suffered injuries. Three battalions set off in pursuit of the VC. During this operation, the VC exploded a mine under a jeep bearing the commander of the 1st Battalion, 43rd Infantry, and two US advisers, killing all three.

12 October

Two ranger companies engaged a VC company in Tuy Phước district killing ten VC, including the district leader, capturing 40 VC and five weapons.

14 October

Leonid Brezhnev replaced Nikita Khrushchev as First Secretary of the Communist Party of the Soviet Union, with Alexei Kosygin succeeding him as premier.

The VC attacked an infantry company guarding the hamlet of So Do, 2km from the capital of Hau Nghia province. While VC gunners pinned down relief forces in the capital, the VC killed 25 soldiers and wounded 11. Another 12 soldiers went missing, as did 57 weapons.

15 October

Nguyễn Văn Trỗi was executed by firing squad in Saigon. A VC guerrilla, he was captured after trying to assassinate Secretary of Defense McNamara and future ambassador Henry Cabot Lodge, Jr. who were visiting South Vietnam, in May 1963. Troi was the first publicly executed VC.

16 October

China conducted its first successful nuclear weapons test. China's possession of nuclear weapons was seen in both Peking and Hanoi as a deterrent to an American invasion of North Vietnam.

Đức, Phát and 18 others were put on trial in a military court over the September coup attempt. The accused officers claimed to have only intended to make a show of force, rather than overthrow Khánh. Đức claimed that the objective of his actions was to "emphasize my ideas" and said his actions did not constitute a coup attempt and that he had decided to end what he regarded as a military protest demonstration when Khánh promised to consider his concerns. Asked why he had denounced Khánh as a "traitor" in a radio broadcast during the coup attempt, Phát said he had merely "gotten excited". One week later, on 24 October, the charges were dropped. Khánh then gave Đức and Phát two months of detention for indiscipline; their subordinates were incarcerated for shorter periods.

Two ranger battalions and the ARVN 21st Division's reconnaissance company were landed by US helicopters along the border of Bac Lieu and Ba Xuyen provinces to encircle a 200-man VC unit. The VC were forced into the open and hit by US Army helicopter gunships. The VC lost 89 killed, 13 captured and 37 weapons recovered. ARVN losses were six dead and 24 wounded.

The 2nd Battalion, 7th Infantry, accompanied by a Popular Forces platoon and a platoon of M24 tanks from the 1st Armored Cavalry Squadron was ambushed by a VC battalion 3km south of Ben Cat on Highway 13. The ARVN overran the original ambush and continued for 1km when they were ambushed again. Two M24s were destroyed by 57mm recoilless rifles and a third damaged before the vehicles could disengage. The VC then surged forward to surround the column. US Army UH–1B gunships and RVNAF A-1s arrived, and together with artillery fire helped the troops fall back to a position where a parallel column reinforced them. The combined force then counterattacked, with the engagement lasting until the VC broke contact at 11:30. The ARVN lost 16 dead, 21 wounded, and four missing. Reported VC losses ranged from 19 to 70 dead and between 40 and 100 casualties evacuated. One VC and 11 weapons were captured.

19 October

Two battalions of the ARVN 13th Infantry Regiment pursued an estimated 300 VC in Vinh Binh province. The battalions failed to make contact, but their movement flushed the VC into the open 2km north of the hamlet of Hoa Hung. ARVN troops landed by US helicopters killed three VC and captured one, and US Army helicopter gunships killed another 31 VC.

20 October

RVNAF aircraft bombed the village of Anlong Chrey in Cambodia killing seven civilians. Cambodia protested to the United Nations.

21 October

In a speech at Akron University, Ohio, Johnson said: "We are not about to send American boys nine or ten thousand miles away from home to do what Asian boys ought to be doing for themselves."

22-24 October

A patrol of 125 CIDG soldiers traveling by sampan along the So Ha River in Kien Phong Province advanced with the aim of capturing a small VC post just inside South Vietnam. As they neared the target, they met a VC company approximately 270m from the Cambodian border. During the ensuing fight, the VC retired across the border, supported by Cambodian troops who fired mortars and machine guns on the CIDG. Subsequently eight VC sampans dashed back into South Vietnam and captured the command sampan. The engagement ended with the allies losing four prisoners (including one US advisor), seven wounded, and four weapons. The allies estimated the VC had suffered 30 casualties. On the 24th CIDG forces found three of the four captives, who had all been executed by gunshots to the head.

23-25 October

After the VC captured several hamlets 20km southwest of Quang Ngai, the ARVN cordoned the area and then attacked the fortified hamlets of Tan Tu and Thuan Thanh Ap. The attack was delayed by minefields and barbed wire and armor and air support was required to break into the hamlets. The VC withdrew on the night of the 24th. ARVN losses were six killed and 22 wounded, while VC losses were 35 killed, 44 captured and over 100 suspects detained.

24 October

Ambassador Taylor met with Sửu and expressed his displeasure that the action had been taken without consulting with the United States. Taylor said that, in the future, "We could not accept" a failure of the government to consult with the U.S.

Cambodia shot down a USAF C-123 aircraft that was flying over the Cambodian border village of Dak Dam in the Mondulkiri Province. All eight crew members on board were killed.

25 October

Phan Khắc Sửu was installed as the new President of South Vietnam as part of the military leaders' promise to make the transition to a civilian government.

27 October

Head of State Sửu appointed Trần Văn Hương as Prime Minister of South Vietnam. Buddhists launched demonstrations against the Hương government. Hương was more resistant to Buddhist demands than the previous Prime Minister, General Khánh, had been. Khánh, however, remained important among the generals.

29-31 October

The ARVN 31st Rangers and two battalions of the 48th Infantry searched a VC base area in Phuoc Thanh province. When the VC fired on a UH–1B, one of the battalions diverted its course toward the gunfire and uncovered a large supply cache. The following day, the infantry drove a VC battalion into the open, where the armed helicopters, fighter-bombers, and artillery inflicted significant casualties. The allies had killed 54 VC, wounded 63, and captured four. They had also captured 660 tons of rice, 200 mines, 1,000 uniforms, and large quantities of other supplies.

30 October

After a visit to South Vietnam Leon Gouré of the RAND Corporation reported that U.S. airpower was having a significant impact on the VC and that further unrestrained use could hurt them even more.

== November ==
1 November

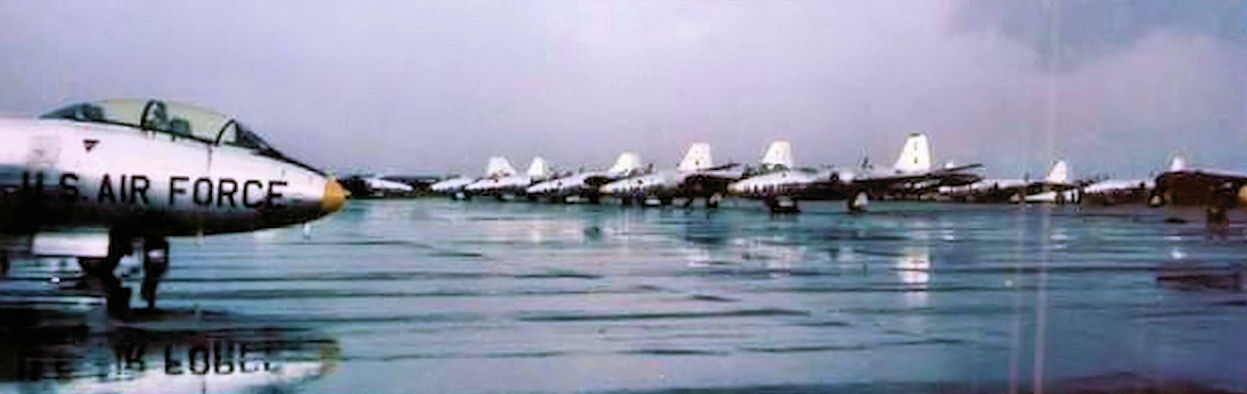
B-57s at Bien Hoa Air Base

The VC attacked Bien Hoa Air Base, 15 miles (24 km) northeast of Saigon, with mortars. Four Americans and two Vietnamese were killed and five B-57s, three A-1Hs and one HH-43F were destroyed and 13 B-57s, three A-1Hs, three HH-43s and two C-47s were damaged. Ambassador Taylor reported that the VC "had changed the ground rules" by targeting a U.S. installation. He advocated a reprisal, but with the election just two days away Johnson elected not to respond.

Due to deteriorating relations, the U.S. embassy in Phnom Penh orders the evacuation of dependents.

2-3 November

During an ARVN 21st Division operation to relieve the VC blockade of Năm Căn, the VC attacked Khai Quang post, 20km northwest of Ca Mau. The 44th Ranger Battalion was deployed by helicopter to the area and, supported by US Army gunships, cleared out VC fortifications killing 56 Viet Cong and capturing a 60mm mortar and 26 individual weapons for the loss of one dead and 16 wounded and one US door gunner killed.

3 November

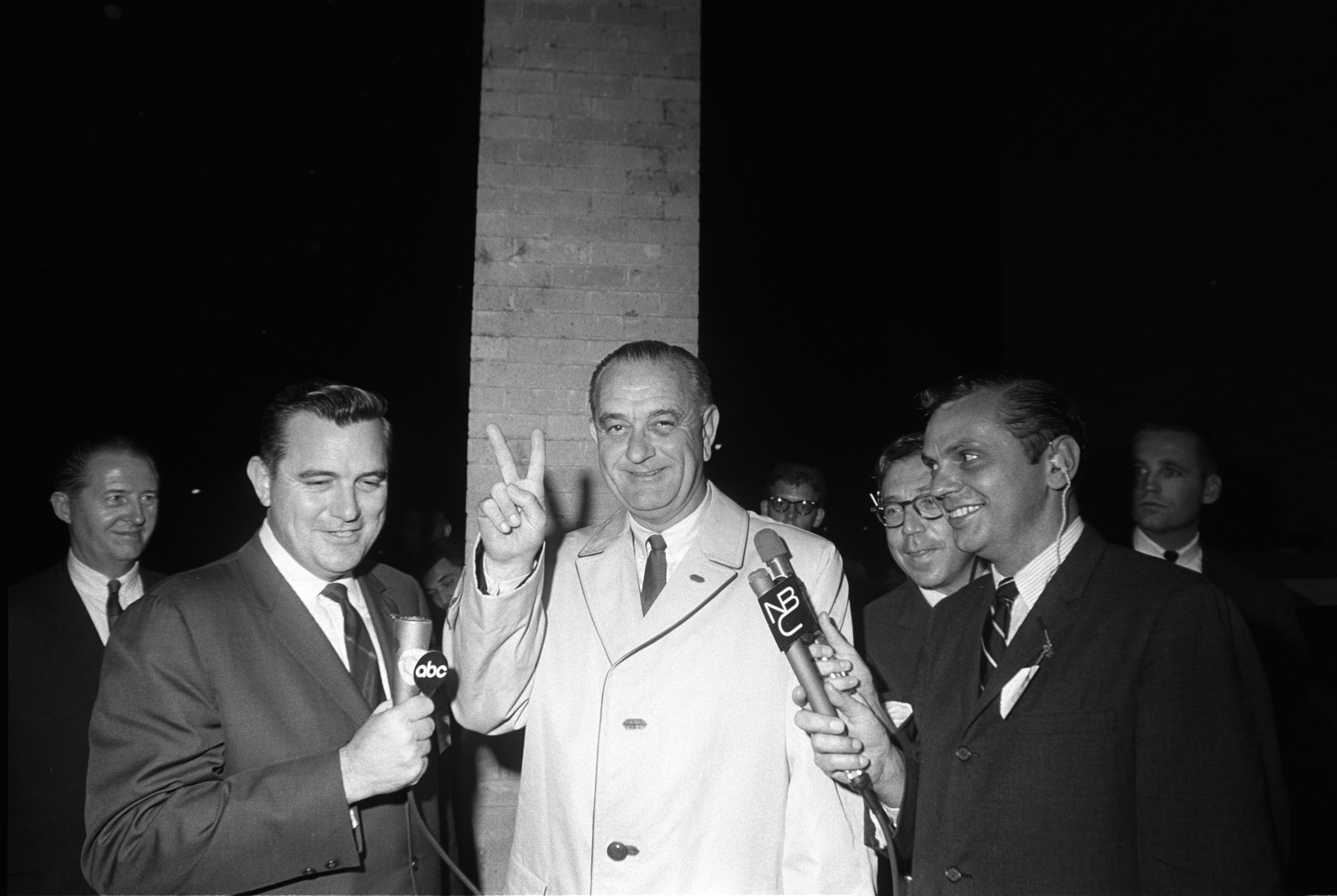
President Johnson celebrates his victory

Johnson won a landslide victory over his Republican opponent, Barry Goldwater, in the Presidential election. Johnson was perceived as the more moderate candidate on issues including the use of U.S. military forces in Vietnam.

4 November

Trần Văn Hương was installed as the new Prime Minister of South Vietnam as part of a civilian government selected by the nation's military leaders.

The VC launched coordinated attacks in Hau Nghia and Long An provinces. Most of the actions were diversionary to the true targets, which were three platoon bases protecting pacification operations along Highway 4 in Long An. The VC overran these in 30 minutes, but the 3rd Battalion, 50th Infantry, to whom the posts belonged, reacted quickly and drove off the VC. ARVN losses were ten dead and 14 wounded. The ARVN found 31 VC dead.

6 November

The RVNAF led by Air Vice Marshal Kỳ launched a 32-aircraft attack against a VC base area in retaliation for the attack on Bien Hoa Air Base, claiming to have killed 500 VC.

7 November

The South Vietnamese Government banned the sale of the latest issue of Newsweek because it contained a photo of the ARVN torturing a VC.

8 November- 31 December

The 23rd Ranger Battalion, two battalions of the 44th Infantry, and territorial forces combed Phu Yen province. By year's end, they had killed 119 VC and captured 13 VC, 29 suspects, and 15 weapons. ARVN losses were 73 dead, 106 wounded, 43 missing, and 45 weapons lost.

9 November

Typhoon Joan struck South Vietnam and parts of North Vietnam shortly after Typhoon Iris, temporarily halting most combat operations and causing torrential rains and floods that would kill more than 5,000 people. The floods affected 13 provinces in South Vietnam, with most of the dead in the Quảng Ngãi, Quảng Nam and Quảng Tín provinces.

10 November

Ambassador Maxwell Taylor cabled Washington with his views. Taylor favored the U.S. expanding its participation in the war against the VC and expanding the war to North Vietnam, even if the government of South Vietnam never became competent—advocating the removal of a previous U.S. prerequisite for participation in the war: the existence of a stable and efficient South Vietnamese government.

11 November

Two VC battalions overran one hamlet, attacked a second, and ambushed relief forces north of Hàm Tân district. The battles resulted in 29 ARVN killed, 33 wounded, and a mortar, an automatic rifle, and 30 weapons captured.

13 November

Cambodian soldiers entered South Vietnam and seized a civilian, this resulted in clashes in which the South Vietnamese capture two Cambodian soldiers and one civilian.

14 November

In an attempt to offset the increasing power of the Young Turks, Khánh brought back Don as the deputy chief of staff, and installed fellow Da Lat General Đính as his assistant.

15 November

China shot down the first of hundreds of Ryan Model 147 drone aircraft that the United States would send into Chinese airspace to monitor China's support of North Vietnam during the war. The drone flights would continue for nearly seven years before being suspended in July 1971.

18-22 November

The ARVN mounted Operation Phong Hoa a 14+ battalion operation against VC bases in Boi Loi Woods, Long Nguyen Secret Zone and the Ho Bo Woods, an area covering more than 770 square km in Hau Nghia, Binh Duong, and Tay Ninh provinces. The initial operation in the Boi Loi Woods was regarded as a complete failure, with the VC C56 Regiment having already withdrawn from the area. On 20 November, VC hidden in tunnels ambushed the 3rd Airborne Battalion in an abandoned rubber plantation. ARVN losses were 22 dead, 67 wounded and one missing. VC losses were claimed as 168 killed and 68 captured.

19 November

A Vietnam working group of mid-level officials from the Departments of State and Defense and the CIA presented its analysis to the senior policymakers of the Johnson Administration. The working group identified three U.S. policy options: Option A was to continue the present policy and reject negotiations with North Vietnam until the situation in South Vietnam improved; Option B was much increased military pressure against North Vietnam until the insurgency in the South was defeated; Option C called for a continuation of present policy but with gradually increased military pressure against the North with no firm position for or against negotiations. Option C was favored by the policymakers.

A South Vietnamese air assault in Quảng Nam Province killed 17 VC and captured 21.

A VC mine derailed a train killing four railway workers.

The ARVN 7th Division encircled the VC 514th and 267th Battalions near the hamlet of Ba Dua, 7km south of Cai Lay town. The attack started well, but the advance bogged down among deep canals bordered by fortified embankments from which the VC fought until escaping the cordon at night. ARVN losses were eight killed and 38 wounded. The allies reportedly killed 106 VC and estimated that the VC had evacuated another 20 to 30 dead. The ARVN also took 55 prisoners, 18 suspects, and a handful of weapons.

20 November

Three regiments (the first full units) of the PAVN to be sent to South Vietnam to assist the VC, departed from North Vietnam to march south along the Ho Chi Minh Trail. Other PAVN troops may have left North Vietnam in October.

The ARVN 2nd Division engaged VC who were searching for food 14km west of Quang Nam. ARVN losses were three dead, 19 wounded and three weapons lost. VC losses were 67 killed, 17 captured and 24 weapons captured.

22–26 November

Buddhists conduct violent protests against the government which continue until martial law is declared on the 26th.

25 November

William H. Sullivan became U.S. ambassador to Laos.

26-27 November

The ARVN 1st Division engaged a VC battalion south of Cam Lộ district. The operation resulted in one ARVN killed and 18 wounded, while the VC lost 73 killed (22 confirmed by American advisers) and three light machine guns, an antiaircraft machine gun, two 60mm mortars, and a 57mm recoilless rifle.

27 November

The ARVN 7th Division surrounded a VC force in a flooded rice paddy near Chợ Gạo. After an all-day battle, the ARVN lost eight killed and 19 wounded, and the VC lost 46 dead, seven prisoners, and 14 weapons, with the VC carrying off many more casualties.

27–28 November

Ambassador Taylor briefed the National Security Council, recommending increased U.S. bombing of North Vietnam. The Council endorsed Taylor's approach and recommended that Johnson adopt it.

28 November

U.S. Army Captain Norman W. Heck, in his last letter home before being killed, said that winning the war would be difficult, but that "A fairly effective program of improving the economic and political situation [of South Vietnam] is ... the whole key to success in winning the whole hearted support of the people, and not in the number of Viet Cong killed."

30 November

ARVN Rangers carried by USMC helicopters raided a hamlet 7km northwest of Danang where two VC platoons had taken refuge. The VC lost 49 killed and 31 captured and 16 weapons captured. It was estimated that the VC had evacuated a further 40 casualties.

== December ==
1 December

Johnson and his top-ranking advisers met to discuss plans to bomb North Vietnam. After some debate, they agreed on a two-phase bombing plan with an objective of ending North Vietnamese support of VC operations in South Vietnam and maintaining the security of other non-Communist nations in Southeast Asia. Phase 1 involved bombing infiltration routes through Laos, while Phase 2 would expand the bombing into North Vietnam.

The VC attacked and briefly captured Thien Giao district town in Binh Thuan Province. The ARVN lost 14 killed, including the district chief, 30 wounded, ten missing, and 194 weapons.

A VC unit captured Thanh My hamlet, 20km west of Ham Tan. The ARVN relief force killed 22 VC and captured eight as well as 11 weapons. The VC carried off an estimated twenty more casualties. ARVN losses were two dead and three wounded.

2 December

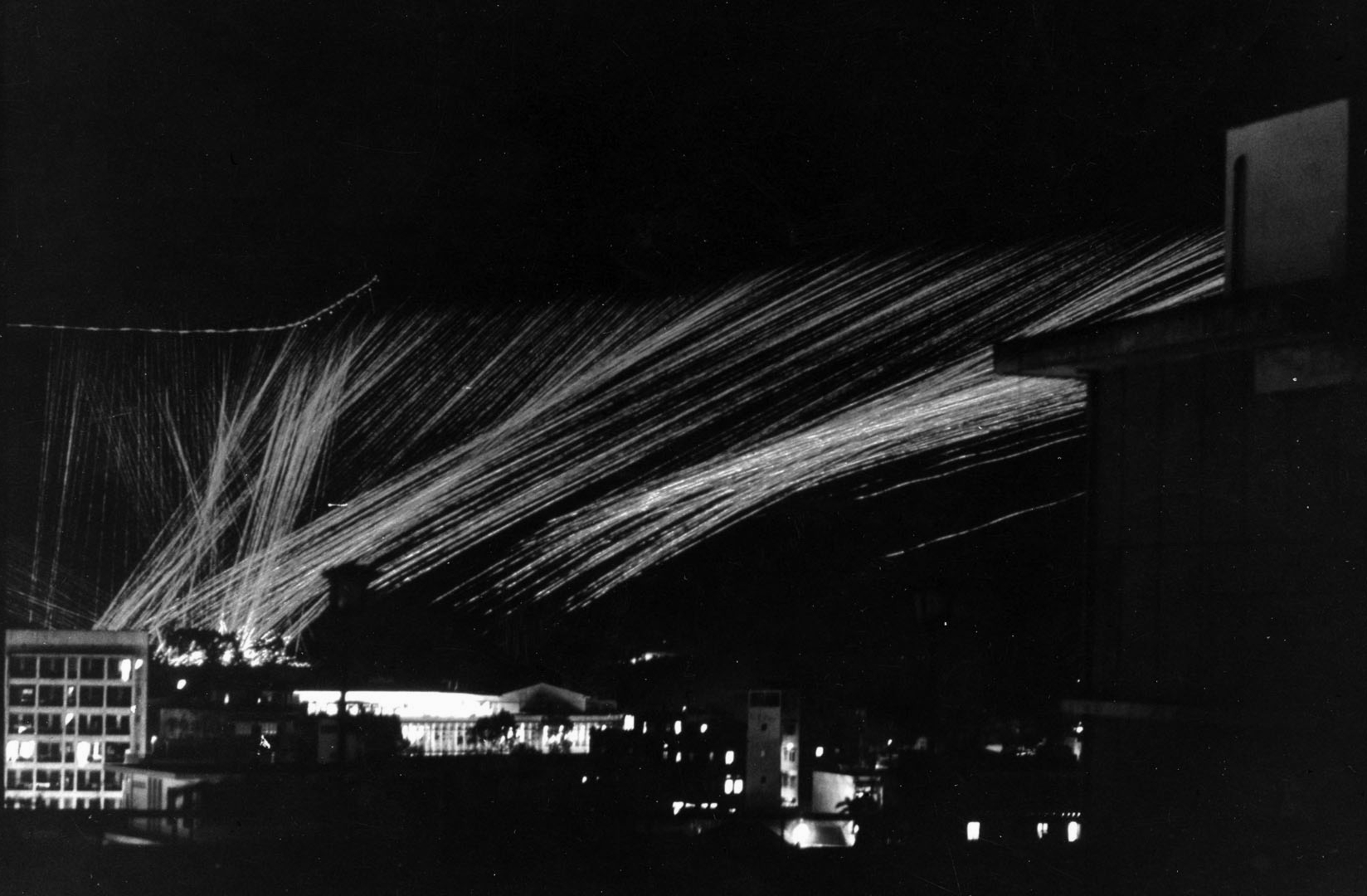
Tracer fire from an AC-47 gunship

Two USAF C-47s were modified at Bien Hoa Air Base to mount three GAU-2/A Miniguns. By 15 December both aircraft had been converted into FC-47 gunships and were assigned to the 1st Air Commando Squadron for combat testing.

5 December

The ARVN 21st Division attacked the VC U Minh 2 Battalion about 15km northeast of Ca Mau. Allied forces killed 115 VC and captured three 60mm mortars, five heavy machine guns, and 51 individual weapons. The ARVN lost 25 dead and 66 wounded. Six US Army aviators were wounded.

7 December

After evacuating 11,000 civilians from Hồng Ngự district on the Cambodian border, the allies hit 15 targets killing 57 VC and destroying 85 houses.

7-9 December

The Battle of An Lao began when the PAVN/VC captured the district headquarters of An Lão, about 300 miles (480 km) from Saigon. The PAVN/VC were successful in repeatedly beating back large numbers of counterattacking ARVN troops. This battle was the first time in that area that the PAVN/VC "used the new tactic of coordinating main force units with local and guerrilla forces." The battle resulted in 316 PAVN/VC killed, 34 ARVN and three US killed.

8 December

An ARVN 33rd Infantry battalion made an amphibious landing near Hà Tiên to look for VC. It advanced toward a cement plant before camping for the night. Although the unit secured its front, it neglected to guard the seacoast to its rear. Fifty VC infiltrated the camp from the coast and penetrated the command post. They killed the entire three-man US advisory team, the battalion commander, and eight other soldiers while they slept and wounded another ten soldiers before escaping.

9 December

A VC battalion attacked and overran an ARVN outpost on Hill 159 8km southwest of Tam Kỳ and attacked an outpost at Ky Long 5km further west. An ARVN 2nd Division force, supported by US Marine and Army helicopters, counter-attacked Hill 159 forcing the VC to retreat. VC losses were 162 killed and two captured and five machineguns, a 57mm recoilless rifle, and 51 individual weapons captured. ARVN losses were 26 dead and 43 wounded, one US advisor was killed.

9-14 December

A Project Delta operation southeast of Nha Trang resulted in 55 VC killed, 17 wounded and 24 captured.

11 December

An RVNAF C-123B crashed into Monkey Mountain shortly after takeoff from Da Nang Air Base killing all 38 on board, including two U.S.

The VC 261st Battalion attacked Ba Dua hamlet which was defended by the 1st Battalion, 11th Infantry, and the 7th Division reconnaissance company. The VC penetrated the hamlet and airburst artillery fire was called in on the hamlet, following which the ARVN counterattacked. ARVN losses were 12 dead and 19 wounded. The VC left 15 dead and it was estimated that they had suffered a further 50 casualties.

The VC D2 Regiment along with a reinforcing unit, four battalions in all, assaulted Long My town in Chuong Thien Province. The territorial defenders held as the VC set three ambushes for the relief forces. After mauling a 21st Division battalion sent toward Long My, the VC returned to attack the town. Once again, the defenders repelled the enemy. Eighteen US and RVNAF A-1s participated in the fighting, with the VC shooting down one and damaging three. They also damaged five US Army helicopters. Allied pilots claimed they had killed 400 insurgents. The ARVN lost 27 dead and 55 wounded. US losses were two dead, five wounded, and one missing.

13 December

A VC battalion captured two outposts simultaneously in Ba Xuyen province. Three territorial companies advanced in relief and engaged the VC in a fight that lasted into the afternoon. The VC broke contact when additional ARVN forces arrived. A hamlet chief and police chief died in the affair, as well as 18 other South Vietnamese, with 37 wounded and 54 missing. Seventy-nine individual and three crew-served weapons were also lost.

14-15 December

Operation Barrel Roll began, a covert interdiction and close air support campaign by the U.S. Air Force 2nd Air Division (later the Seventh Air Force) and U.S. Navy Task Force 77, conducted in the Kingdom of Laos. The campaign would continue until 1973.

A VC battalion attacked Thon La Chu, 3km southwest of Hue. The 1st Battalion, 31st Infantry attacked An Do hamlet but were unable to advance and withdrew to allow airstrikes and artillery fire. The VC evacuated An Do overnight. The battalion fought its way into Bon Tri hamlet, but then withdrew for the night. Again the VC evacuated overnight. ARVN loses were 12 dead and 39 wounded and one US adviser killed. VC losses were 58 killed and nine captured.

15-20 December

The ARVN 1st Battalion, 8th Infantry, backed by the 5th Division reconnaissance company and an engineer company, struck an underground complex 24km northwest of Saigon near Ap Nha Viec, Binh Duong province. For five days the troops searched the tunnels and then used explosives to seal their entrances. The operation resulted 21 VC killed and five captured. Defectors later said that about 100 VC died in the tunnels because of the demolition work. ARVN losses were one dead and three wounded.

16 December

The U.S. Embassy in Saigon reported that Prime Minister Huong had successfully repressed Buddhist demonstrations against the government, had imposed censorship and shut down ten newspapers suspected of collaborating with communists.

19 December

Junta leader Khánh led a group of military officers called the "Young Turks" comprising Air Marshal Nguyễn Cao Kỳ, I Corps commander General Nguyễn Chánh Thi and IV Corps commander Thiệu, in a coup. They dissolved the civilian High National Council, arrested a number of military officers and civilian officials, and created an Armed Forces Council. Hương remained as Prime Minister. Taylor was outraged by the coup, berating Khánh and the Young Turks who, he said, had acted "without consulting with U.S. representatives and in disregarding our advice on important matters."

A Cambodian diplomat in Hanoi reported that "Anti-aircraft guns have been positioned on rooftops, and people are busy digging trenches in the streets." Author Pierre Asselin later said, "Although Americans did not know it at the time, the Vietnam War had begun."

22 December

In an address over military radio, Khánh said, "We make sacrifices for the country's independence and the Vietnamese people's liberty, but not to carry out the policy of any foreign country." He said it was "better to live poor but proud as free citizens of an independent country rather than in ease and shame as slaves of the foreigners and Communists." Khánh pledged support for both Hương and Suu's civilian rule, and condemned colonialism in a thinly veiled reference to the US.

23 December

In an exclusive interview with Beverly Deepe published in the New York Herald Tribune on December 23, Khánh said "if Taylor did not act more intelligently, Southeast Asia would be lost" and added that Taylor's "attitude during the last 48 hours—as far as my small head is concerned—has been beyond imagination". Justifying the removal of the HNC, Khánh said they were "exploited by counter-revolutionary elements who placed partisan considerations above the homeland's sacred interest."

In the evening, Khánh convinced his fellow officers to join him in lobbying Hương to declare Taylor persona non grata and expel him from South Vietnam. However, someone in the junta was a CIA informant and reported the incident, allowing American officials to individually lobby the officers to change their stance. At the same time, the Americans informed Hương if Taylor was expelled, US funding would stop. The next day, the generals changed their mind and when they met Hương at his office, only asked him to formally denounce Taylor's behavior in his meetings with Khánh and his quartet and to "take appropriate measures to preserve the honor of all the Vietnamese armed forces and to keep national prestige intact".

24 December

On December 24, Khánh issued a declaration of independence from "foreign manipulation", and condemned "colonialism", explicitly accusing Taylor of abusing his power. In response to the strained relations, General Westmoreland requested CINCPAC to place a Marine Landing Force off Vũng Tàu, at the mouth of the Saigon River around 80 km southeast of the capital. Westmoreland also put American marines based at Subic Bay in the Philippines on notice.

Bob Hope made his first Christmas visit to South Vietnam, and he and his 60-member troupe entertained 1,200 servicemen at Bien Hoa Air Base. He opened by joking, "Hello, advisers. Here I am in Bien Hoa ... which is Vietnamese for 'Duck!!'". Referring to his surroundings as "Sniper Valley", he said, "As I flew in today, they gave us a 21-gun salute ... Three of them were ours."

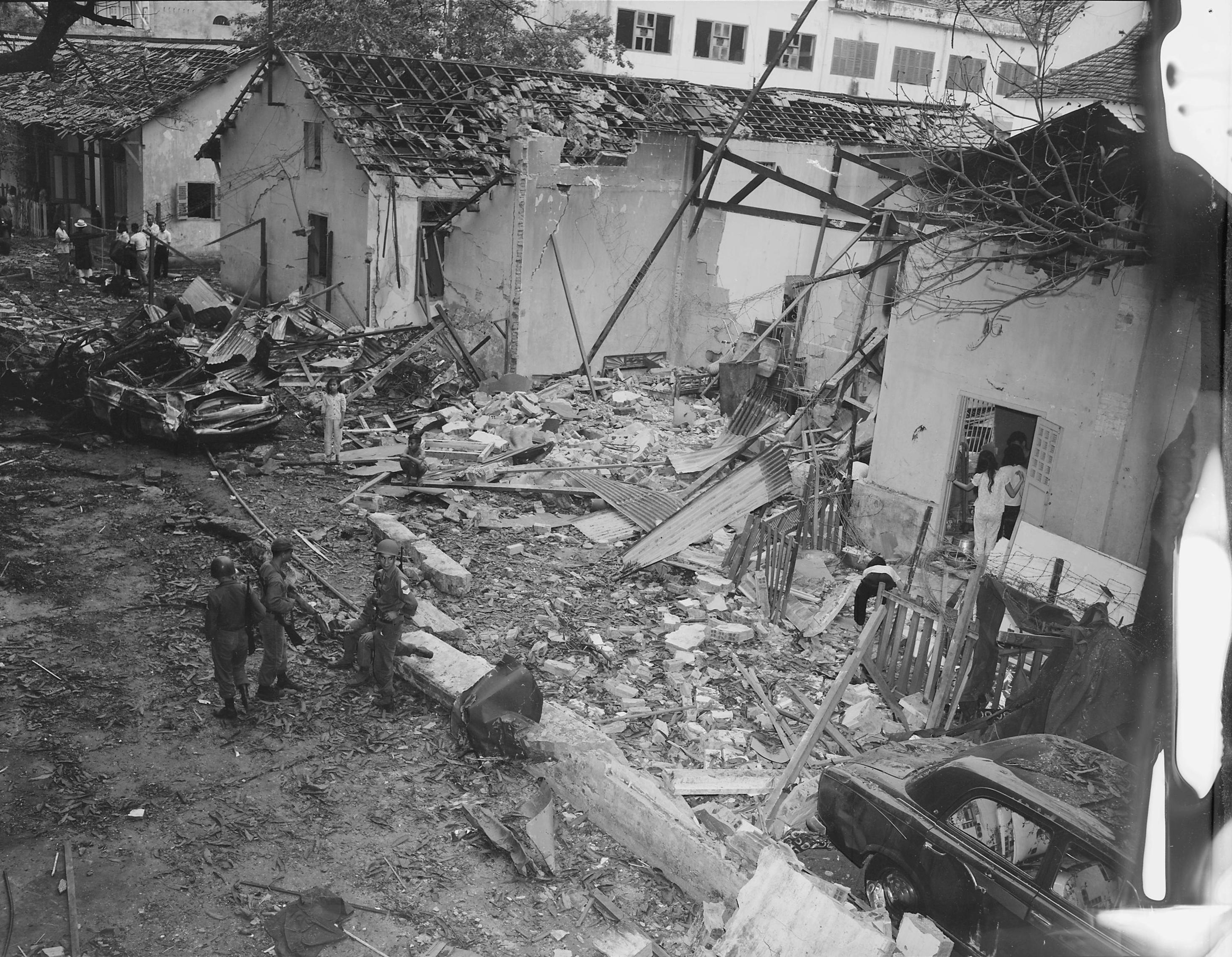
Aftermath of the Brinks Hotel Bombing

The Brinks Hotel in Saigon was bombed by the VC. Two VC operatives detonated a car bomb underneath the hotel, which was a Bachelor Officer Quarters for U.S. Army officers; the explosion killed two American officers and injured approximately 60, including military personnel and Vietnamese civilians. The attack just missed the arrival of Bob Hope's entourage. So unsettled was the situation in South Vietnam that the U.S. could not immediately determine whether the attack was by the VC or by disenchanted South Vietnamese officials.

25 December

Angry with Deepe for airing Khánh's grievances, Taylor excluded her from a private briefing to the other US journalists. However, someone informed Deepe of what Taylor had said, and she published the remarks on December 25 under the title "Taylor Rips Mask Off Khánh". In this article, Taylor was quoted as describing some South Vietnamese officers as borderline "nuts" and accusing many generals of staying in Saigon and allowing their junior officers to run the war as they saw fit. Deepe's article caused an uproar due to the tension between Taylor and the Vietnamese generals.

27 December

A VC battalion overran the 21-man garrison of Quoi Thanh post and the neighboring district town of Ham Long in Kien Hoa province. The ARVN 7th Division sent in a relief force. At 15:00, the 3rd Battalion, 10th Infantry walked into an L-shaped ambush in a palm forest. The battalion formed a defensive perimeter and awaited reinforcements, but was unable to be relieved until after the VC withdrew that night. The ARVN lost 52 killed, 36 wounded, and 31 missing along with 58 weapons. The allies captured tow VC and estimated VC casualties at 100.

ARVN territorial soldiers encountered a battalion from the VC D2 Regiment and two local force companies, 500 troops in all, that were protecting the commander of Military Region 3, General Dong Van Cong. US Army helicopters deployed 80 men from the 42nd Ranger Battalion who were immediately pinned down. After two hours of heavy fighting, the 44th Rangers were landed and they attacked the VC in the flank, driving them from their positions. US Army gunships and RVNAF A-1s then pursued the retreating VC. The ARVN lost 15 dead and 38 wounded. US losses were twelve wounded, with one UH–1B destroyed. C losses were 82 killed and eight captured, with some claiming VC casualties totaled 300. The South Vietnamese captured a machine gun, two 75mm recoilless rifles, two 60mm mortars, five .50-caliber antiaircraft machine guns, and 29 other weapons. According to prisoners and captured documents, the D2 Regiment had lost 50 percent of its strength between the battles of 11 and 27 December, General Cong, however, escaped.

28-30 December

Two battalions of the 49th Infantry and three platoons of artillery attacked the VC 506th Battalion. VC losses were 25 killed, three wounded and 20 suspects captured. The ARVN had eight casualties.

28 December – 2 January 1965

In the Battle of Binh Gia, a Catholic village not far from Saigon was attacked by the VC. Before retiring, the VC killed 201 ARVN soldiers and five American advisers, VC losses were at least 32 killed. Binh Ghia was the largest battle to date between the ARVN and the VC.

29 December

The Guardian echoed a large number of media outlets worldwide, saying, "Perhaps the least damaging decision for America ... would be a withdrawal (from South Vietnam) based on a clear and detailed statement explaining the impossibility of assisting a sovereign country to defend itself when it refuses to concentrate its own efforts or its own defense, or to abandon its internal factional struggles."

29-30 December

The VC 2nd Regiment attacked a CIDG company encamped at the hamlet of Dong So, Binh Duong Province. Of the 150 CIDG defenders, 28 died, 26 were wounded, and 11 went missing. Two newly arrived US advisers from Detachment A–314were killed.

30 December

Johnson cabled Ambassador Taylor in Saigon, criticizing Taylor for his inability to communicate "sensitively and persuasively" with the South Vietnamese during the ongoing political crisis there. Turning to the military situation, Johnson said, "Every time I get a military recommendation it seems to me that it calls for large-scale bombing. I have never felt that this war will be won from the air, and it seems to me that what is much more needed and would be more effective is a larger and stronger use of Rangers and Special Forces and Marines, or other appropriate military strength on the ground." Johnson said, "I myself am ready to substantially increase the number of Americans fighting in Vietnam."

Johnson rejected the calls from Westmoreland and Taylor among others to authorize reprisal bombings against North Vietnam, citing political instability in Saigon. He reasoned that outside opinion was unlikely to believe the Viet Cong were behind the attack, feeling they would instead blame local infighting for the violence and conclude that the Americans were "trying to shoot its way out of an internal [South Vietnamese] political crisis".

31 December

During 1964 16,785 VC/PAVN were killed, 4,157 captured, 5,417 became Chieu Hoi and 5,881 weapons were captured. South Vietnamese losses were 7,457 killed, 16,700 wounded, 5,000 became prisoners or went missing, 73,000 deserted and more than 14,000 weapons were lost. US losses were 146 killed, 1,034 wounded and 22 missing or captured. The VC kidnapped or killed 2,490 officials and 9,782 civilians as part of its campaign to paralyze the government and to terrorize the population into submission.

Over the course of the year, in South Vietnam the VC and PAVN main-force soldiers increased to 56,600, while the total number of guerrilla personnel was about 81,000, with a further 43,100 cadre, logistical and administrative personnel. Although the total number may have been as high as 295,000. They were better armed, especially with Chinese-made AK-47s, and more aggressive. Casualties inflicted on South Vietnam's armed forces increased from 1,900 in January to 3,000 in December. An estimated 12,400 soldiers from North Vietnam were infiltrated into South Vietnam during the year.

Estimated government control over the South Vietnamese population had declined from 79% at the time of Diem's overthrow in November 1963 to 64% in January and then to 55% in December.

== Year in numbers ==
Armed Force	Strength	KIA	Military costs – 1964	Military costs – 2014	Reference
South Vietnam	514,000	7,457
United States Forces	23,310	146
South Korea	200
Australia	200	1
Philippines	17
New Zealand	30
Vietnam PAVN/VC	137,600	16,785

== Sources ==
- Foreign Relations of the United States, 1964–1968, Volume I, Vietnam, 1964. U.S. Department of State.
- "Transcript of Tonkin Gulf Resolution (1964)". Our Documents. 9 April 2021.

== See also ==
List of allied military operations of the Vietnam War (1964)
