= Battle of Kien Long =

Part of the Vietnam War (1964)

- Part of the Vietnam War
Date	11-12 April 1964
Location	Kien Long, Chương Thiện Province, South Vietnam
Result	South Vietnamese victory; successful Viet Cong withdrawal

Belligerents
South Vietnam	Viet Cong

Strength
Five+ battalions	Three battalions

Casualties and losses
300	ARVN claimed: 175 dead 1 captured

The Battle of Kiên Long was an early engagement of the Vietnam War. It was initiated by the Viet Cong (VC) invasion of the Kiên Long district in the Chương Thiện Province of South Vietnam.

== Battle ==
On the night of 11–12 April 1964, the VC attacked several outposts and Kien Long district town in southern Chương Thiện province, 200km south of Saigon. The VC 96th Battalion captured the town and then blew up the homes of the district chief and his deputy, killing both officials and their families. The VC had a harder time with the town's Civil Guard post. Although the VC penetrated the base and captured a 105mm howitzer, which allied aircraft then destroyed, the defenders continued to fight until the VC withdrew at dawn.

The withdrawal was a tactical move, as the VC massed three battalions to await the expected relief operation. The first relief forces to arrive at Kien Long were 150 rangers ferried in by U.S. Army helicopters. The helicopters surprised the VC by making a contour-hugging approach, but the VC quickly recovered. The VC shot down one helicopter and hit 13 others. Then, at 11:30, ten C–123 aircraft dropped a reinforced airborne battalion, with strong winds causing many casualties among the parachutists. As the day progressed, four infantry battalions arrived to try to seal the area, with the 1st Battalion, 32nd Infantry, showing particular gallantry. Meanwhile, three CIDG companies advanced from Tan Phu toward the battlefield. They walked into an ambush set by the VC 309th Battalion from which they barely escaped, suffering 20 dead, 33 wounded (including two Americans), and eight missing. The wider battle raged all day and into the night with allied aircraft flying more than 100 sorties.

== Aftermath ==
South Vietnamese casualties included about 300 soldiers and an equal number of civilians. The U.S. suffered eight casualties. The VC lost 175 soldiers. During the battle, the VC had demonstrated their improving logistical situation by firing more than 300 rounds of 81mm mortar ammunition.
