= Nam Dong =

- Commune
- Interactive map of Nam Dong
- Coordinates: 12.658373°N 107.867705°E
- Country: Vietnam
- Region: South Central Coast and Central Highlands
- Province: Lâm Đồng
- Established: 26 January 1989
- Administrative headquarters: Hamlet 14

Area
  - Total: 104.04 km^{2} (40.17 sq mi)

Population (31 December 2024)
  - Total: 35,701
  - Density: 343/km^{2} (890/sq mi)
- Postal code: 65410

Nam Dong is a commune in Lâm Đồng province, Vietnam.

On 16 June 2025, the Standing Committee of the National Assembly of Vietnam issued Resolution No. 1671/NQ-UBTVQH15 on the arrangement of commune-level administrative units in Lâm Đồng province in 2025. Under the resolution, the entire area and population of Đắk D'rông and Nam Dong communes, formerly part of Cư Jút district, Đắk Nông province, were merged to form a new commune named Nam Dong.
