= An Lão, Gia Lai =

An Lão Xã An Lão
- Commune
- An Lão commune
- Location within Vietnam
- Coordinates: 14°36′39″N 108°53′31″E
- Country: Vietnam
- Region: South Central Coast
- Province: Gia Lai
- Time zone: UTC+7 (UTC + 7)

An Lão is a commune (xã) of Gia Lai Province, Vietnam.
