= Battle of Long Dinh =

1964 battle of the Vietnam War

- Part of the Vietnam War
Date	26 February 1964
Location	Long Định, Định Tường province, South Vietnam
Result	South Vietnamese victory

Belligerents
South Vietnam	Viet Cong

Commanders and leaders
(South Vietnam) Colonel Tan Hoang Quan	Unknown

Units involved
4+ battalions	514th Battalion

Strength
~3,000	600

Casualties and losses
19 killed 1 missing	89 killed 2 captured

The Battle of Long Định took place during the Vietnam War between the Viet Cong (VC) and the Army of the Republic of Vietnam (ARVN).

== Background ==
In late February the ARVN operations and intelligence center reported that the VC 514th Battalion was operating in Long Dinh District, Định Tường province. Agents subsequently confirmed the information.

== Operation ==
At 07:30 on 26 February an airborne battalion, two marine battalions, an M113 troop, two Civil Guard companies, and naval craft encircled the suspect area. The government troops then converged, cutting their way through heavy vegetation. Contact began almost immediately, but major fighting did not commence until 13:00. Artillery and fighter-bombers hit the VC as the force advanced and U.S. helicopters flew a ranger battalion into a blocking position. At 18:30, the 514th Battalion charged the 1st Marine Battalion in a mangrove swamp. Two companies held in heavy fighting, but a third company broke, allowing the VC to escape. Operations on subsequent days failed to regain contact.

== Aftermath ==
The South Vietnamese lost 19 killed, 40 wounded, and one missing. 89 VC were killed and took two captured and a further 22 suspects were detained. In a rare imposition of accountability, the South Vietnamese demoted to the rank of private three officers in the Marine company that had fled the battle.
