= Bến Súc =

Vietnamese village destroyed in 1967

Coordinates: 11°9′39.97″N 106°26′54.72″E

Bến Súc was a village in Dầu Tiếng District that was evacuated then systematically destroyed in January 1967, in Operation Cedar Falls, during the Vietnam War. Today, the modern village of Thanh Tuyền, Dầu Tiếng is located on the site of Bến Súc.

== Vietnam War history ==
Ben Suc was the main pillar of the Vietcong's dominance over the Iron Triangle. This fortified village functioned as a major supply and political center with its population organized as rear service companies.

Following the village's screening, 106 villagers were detained; the remaining inhabitants of Ben Suc and of surrounding villages, some 6,000 individuals, two-thirds of them children, were deported, along with their belongings and livestock, in trucks, river boats and helicopters to relocation camps. After the deportation of the village's population, Ben Suc was systematically erased by American engineers who first burned the village's buildings to the ground and then leveled their remnants as well as the surrounding vegetation using bulldozers.
