= Chương Thiện province =

Historic province of Vietnam

Chương Thiện was a former province of South Vietnam from 1961 to 1975, after the war, it became the Hau Giang province. On 24 December 1961, it was formed after the Decree No. 244-NV. In June 2025, the province merged with Can Tho when the vietnamese government decided to merge countless provinces together.

It had 5 districts: Đức Long, Kiên Hưng, Kiên Long, Kiên Thiện and Long Mỹ. Vi Thanh was the capital of the province. Chương Thiện was created in 1961 by taking land from the provinces located surrounding what became Chương Thiện. The new province had no land on the coast and was very rural. The land in the province went back to more historical boundaries at the end of the Vietnam War.
