= Ngã Bảy =

Ward in Cần Thơ city, Vietnam

- Ward
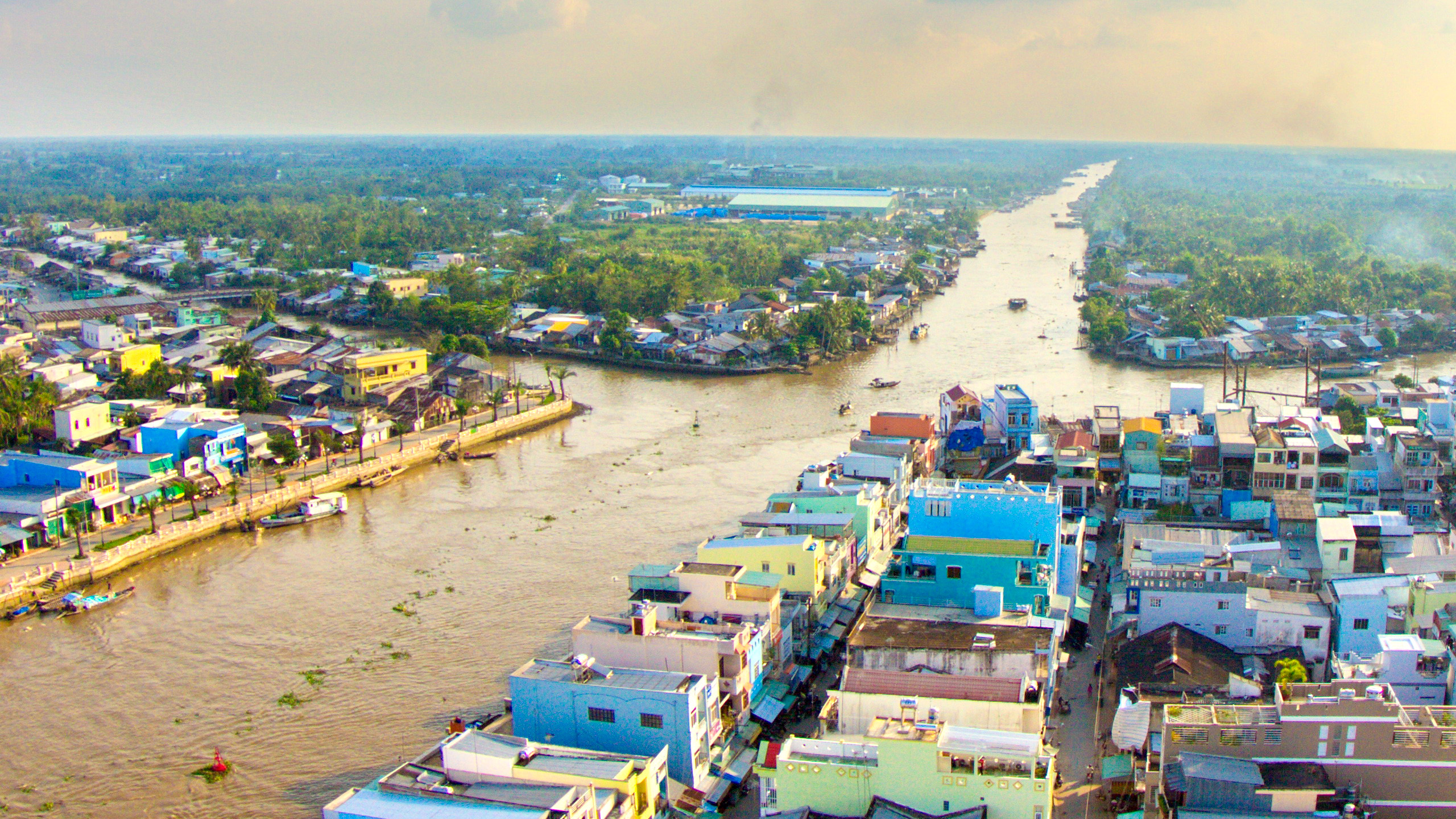
- A view in Ngã Bảy
- Country: Vietnam
- Region: Mekong Delta
- Centrally- governed city: Cần Thơ
- Establish: June 16, 2025

Government
  - Type: Ward
  - Body: People's Council of Ngã Bảy ward

Area
  - Total: 25.17 km^{2} (9.72 sq mi)

Population (2025)
  - Total: 37,861 people
  - Density: 1,504/km^{2} (3,896/sq mi)
- Time zone: UTC+07:00

Ngã Bảy is a ward in Cần Thơ city, Vietnam. It is one of 103 wards and communes in the city following the 2025 reorganization. Prior to 2025, Ngã Bảy was the name of a ward and a provincial city in Hậu Giang province.

Ngã Bảy is closely associated with a complex system of rivers, canals, and waterways, and its transportation activities. This area has a thriving economy in trade, services, agriculture, and transportation.

Ngã Bảy has the Ngã Bảy Floating Market, a distinctive cultural feature of Mekong Delta's trading culture. Ngã Bảy is located 25km south of Ninh Kiều ward and 140km southwest of Ho Chi Minh City.

== Etymology ==
Ngã Bảy means "the intersection of seven canals" because it is the place where seven canals: Cái Côn, Quản Lộ – Phụng Hiệp, Lái Hiếu, Mang Cá, Mương Lộ, Xẻo Dong and Xẻo Môn.

== Geography ==
Location of Ngã Bảy ward on Cần Thơ municipality map.

Ngã Bảy is a ward in Cần Thơ city, located 25km south of Ninh Kiều ward, 25km north of Sóc Trăng ward, and 40km east of Vị Thanh ward. It borders Đại Thành ward to the north, Đại Hải commune to the east; Tân Phước Hưng and Hiệp Hưng commune to the south; Phụng Hiệp commune to the west.

== Subdivisions ==
Ngã Bảy ward is divided into 10 neighborhoods, numbered from 1 to 10.

== History ==
Prior to 2025, Ngã Bảy ward consisted of Hiệp Thành, Lái Hiếu and Ngã Bảy wards belonging to Ngã Bảy provincial city, Hậu Giang province.

On June 12, 2025, the National Assembly of Vietnam issued Resolution No. 202/2025/QH15 on the reorganization of provincial-level administrative units. Cần Thơ city was established by merging the entire area and population of Cần Thơ city, Hậu Giang, and Sóc Trăng provinces.

On June 16, 2025, the Standing Committee of the National Assembly of Vietnam issued Resolution No. 1668/NQ-UBTVQH15 on the reorganization of commune-level administrative units in Cần Thơ city. Ngã Bảy ward was established by merging the entire area and population of Hiệp Thành, Lái Hiếu and Ngã Bảy wards (formerly part of Ngã Bảy provincial city).
