= Đại Thành =

Ward in Cần Thơ city, Vietnam

- Ward
- Interactive map of Đại Thành
- Country: Vietnam
- Region: Mekong Delta
- Centrally- governed city: Cần Thơ
- Established: June 16, 2025

Government
  - Type: Ward
  - Body: People's Council of Đại Thành ward

Area
  - Total: 53.00 km^{2} (20.46 sq mi)
- Time zone: UTC+07:00

Đại Thành is a ward in Cần Thơ city, Vietnam. It is one of 103 wards and communes in the city following the 2025 reorganization.

== Etymology ==
The name Đại Thành is derived from the names of two martyrs, Nguyễn Văn Đại and Nguyễn Văn Thành, who died in Phụng Hiệp during the resistance against French colonialism.

== Geography ==
Location of Đại Thành ward on Cần Thơ city map.

Đại Thành is a ward in Cần Thơ city, located 20km south of Ninh Kiều ward, 40km east of Vị Thanh ward and 30km north of Sóc Trăng ward. It borders with Phụng Hiệp commune and Ngã Bảy ward; An Lạc Thôn and Đại Hải communes to the east; Phú Hữu commune to the north and Thạnh Hòa commune to the west.

== Subdivisions ==
Đại Thành ward is divided into 11 neighborhoods: Ba Ngàn, Cái Côn, Đông An A, Đông An B, Đông Bình, Láng Sen, Mái Dầm, Sơn Phú 1, Sơn Phú 2, Xẻo Vông A, Xẻo Vông B.

== History ==
Prior to 2025, the area of Đại Thành ward was formerly Đại Thành, Tân Thành communes and Hiệp Lợi ward of Ngã Bảy provincial city, Hậu Giang province.

On June 12, 2025, the Vietnamese National Assembly issued Resolution No. 202/2025/QH15 on the reorganization of provincial-level administrative units. Hậu Giang and Sóc Trăng provinces were merged into Cần Thơ city.

On June 16, 2025, the Standing Committee of the National Assembly of Vietnam issued Resolution No. 1668/NQ-UBTVQH15 on the reorganization of commune-level administrative units in Cần Thơ city. Đại Thành ward was established by merging the entire area and population of Hiệp Lợi ward, Đại Thành and Tân Thành communes (formerly part of Ngã Bảy provincial city).
