= Thanh An =

Thanh An may refer to:

- Thanh An, Bình Dương, a commune in Dầu Tiếng District, Bình Dương Province
- Thanh An, Điện Biên, a commune in Điện Biên District, Điện Biên Province
- Thanh An, Bình Phước, a commune in Hớn Quản District, Bình Phước Province
- Thanh An, Quảng Ngãi, a commune in Minh Long District, Quảng Ngãi Province
- Thanh An, Nghệ An, a commune in Thanh Chương District, Nghệ An Province
- Thanh An, Hải Dương, a commune in Thanh Hà District, Hai Duong Province

== Thành An ==
- Thành An, Gia Lai, a commune in An Khê District, Gia Lai Province
- Thành An, Bến Tre, a commune in Mỏ Cày Bắc District, Bến Tre Province
- Thành An, Thanh Hóa, a commune in Thạch Thành District, Thanh Hóa Province

== Thạnh An ==
- Thạnh An, Ho Chi Minh City, a commune in Cần Giờ District, Ho Chi Minh City
- Thạnh An, Long An, a commune in Thạnh Hóa District, Long An Province
- Thạnh An (township), Cần Thơ, a township and district seat of Vĩnh Thạnh District, Cần Thơ
- Thạnh An (commune), Cần Thơ, a commune in Vĩnh Thạnh District, Cần Thơ
