= Ô Môn =

- Ward
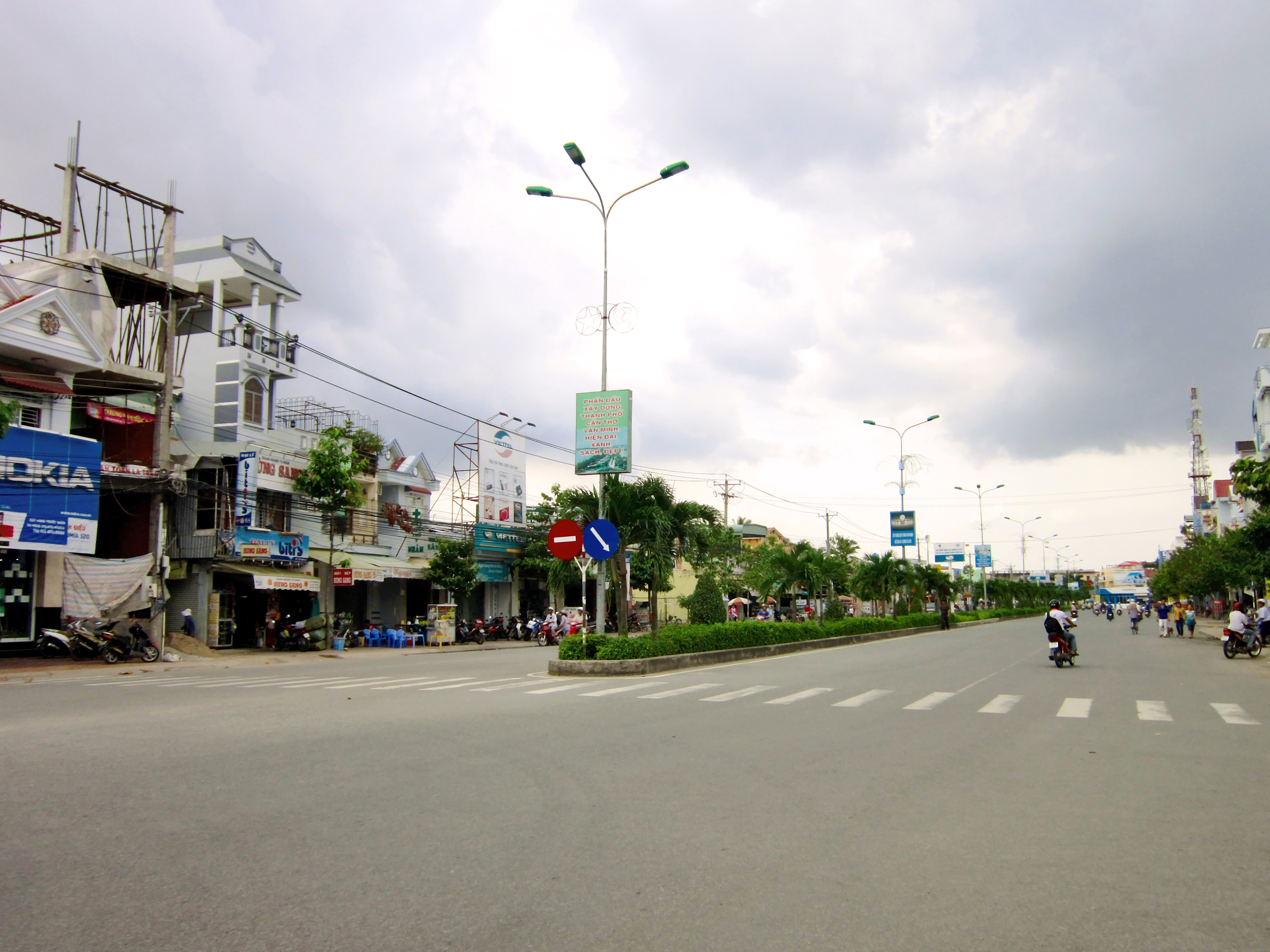
- Trần Hưng Đạo avenue
- Interactive map of Ô Môn
- Coordinates: 10°07′10″N 105°37′30″E
- Country: Vietnam
- Municipality: Cần Thơ
- Establish: June 16, 2025

Area
  - Total: 54.69 km^{2} (21.12 sq mi)

Population (2025)
  - Total: 73,412 people
  - Density: 1,342/km^{2} (3,477/sq mi)
- Time zone: UTC+07:00

Ô Môn is a ward in Cần Thơ municipality, Vietnam. It is one of 103 wards and communes in the municipality after following the 2025 reorganization.

== Geography ==
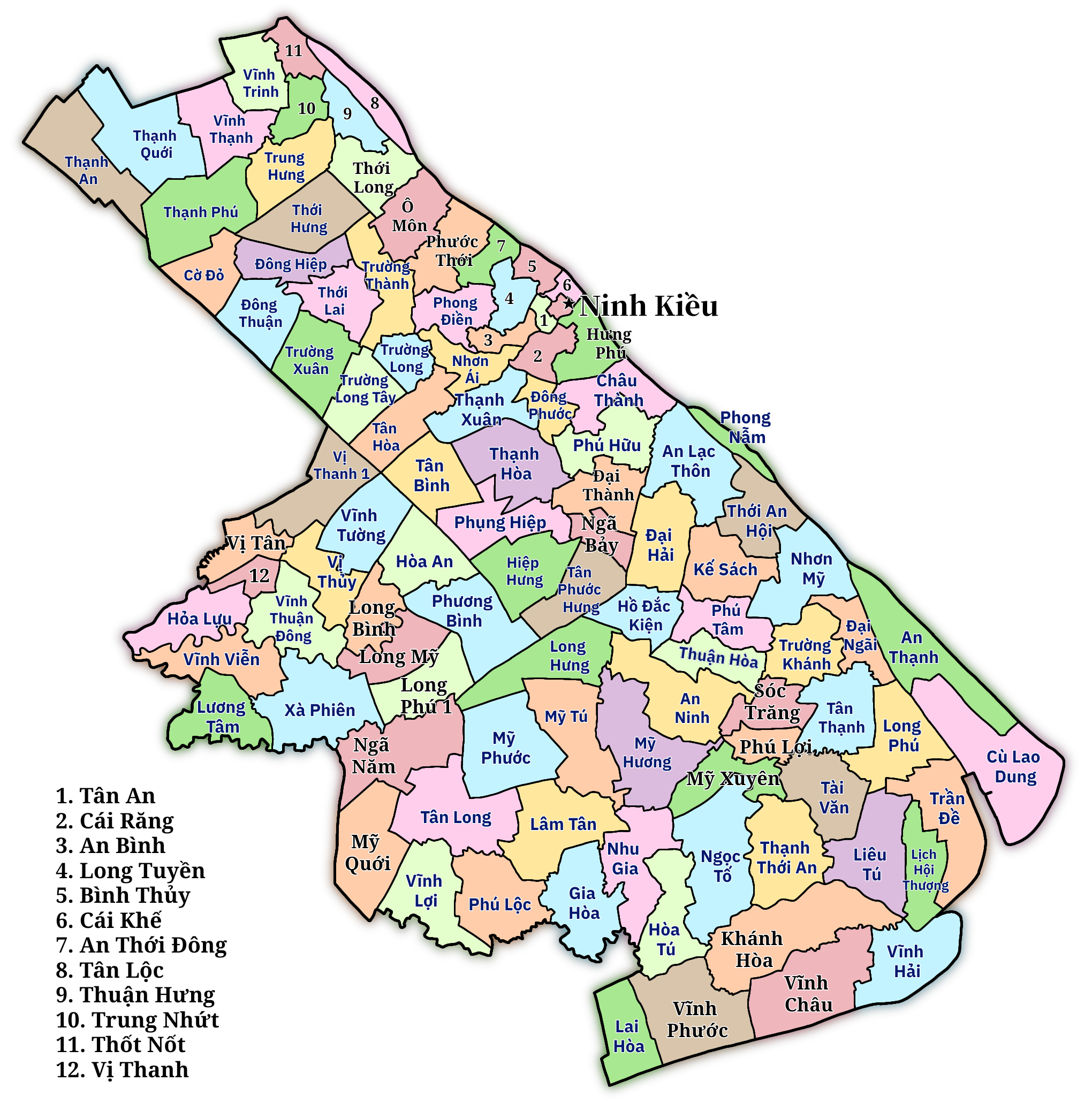
Location of Ô Môn ward on Cần Thơ municipality map.

Ô Môn ward has the following geographical location:

- To the east, it borders Phước Thới ward and Đồng Tháp province.
- To the west and southwest, it borders Trường Thành commune.
- To the northwest it borders Thới Long ward.

== History ==
Prior to 2025, Ô Môn ward was formerly Châu Văn Liêm, Thới An, Thới Hòa wards (belonging to Ô Môn district) and Thới Thạnh commune (belonging to Thới Lai district) of Cần Thơ municipality.

On June 12, 2025, the National Assembly of Vietnam issued Resolution No. 202/2025/QH15 on the reorganization of provincial-level administrative units. Accordingly:

- Cần Thơ municipality was established by merging the entire area and population of Cần Thơ municipality, Hậu Giang province, and Sóc Trăng province.

On June 16, 2025, the Standing Committee of the National Assembly of Vietnam issued Resolution No. 1668/NQ-UBTVQH15 on the reorganization of commune-level administrative units in Cần Thơ municipality. Accordingly:

- Ô Môn ward was established by merging the entire area and population of Châu Văn Liêm, Thới An, and Thới Hòa wards (formerly part of Ô Môn district) and Thới Thạnh commune (formerly part of Thới Lai district).
