= Thới Lai (disambiguation) =

Thới Lai may refer to several places in Vietnam:

- Thới Lai, Cần Thơ, a commune of Cần Thơ
- Thới Lai district, a former rural district of Cần Thơ
- Thới Lai, Bến Tre, a former commune of Bình Đại District
