= Thanh Điền (guitarist) =

- Born: Lê Thanh Điền; 4 May 1967; Cần Thơ, Vietnam
- Died: 25 December 2023 (aged 56) Cần Thơ, Vietnam

Lê Thanh Điền (4 May 1967 – 25 December 2023), known online as Thanh Điền guitar and Thanh Dien guitarist, was a Vietnamese guitarist.

Born blind, he was known for his YouTube channel, where he provided backing music for singers singing old and modern songs.

== Life and career ==
Thanh Điền was born blind on 4 May 1967, and was adopted by a family. After his adoptive parents died, Thanh Điền lived with his adoptive brother in Trung An commune, Cờ Đỏ district, Cần Thơ city.

Thanh learned to play the guitar from 9–10 years old. He said it took him about 15 years to be able to be proficient in playing. He could play guitar, mandolin, đàn nhị and đàn nguyệt.

Thanh made a living by playing the guitar at parties and weddings. According to him, when playing the accompaniment for others to sing, he found himself useful. In addition to backing, he could play solo, or backing nhạc tài tử.

== Death ==
Thanh Điền died of severe anemia on 25 December 2023, at the age of 56.
