= Vinh Thanh High School =

Vinh Thanh high school
- Trường Trung học phổ thông Vĩnh Thạnh
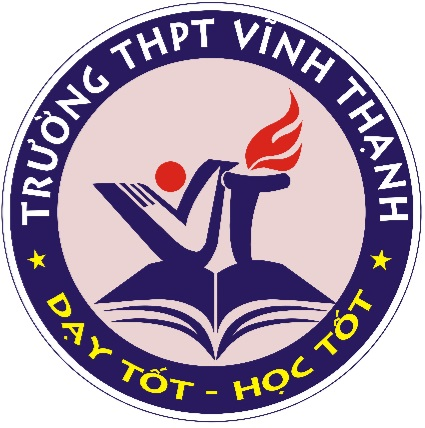

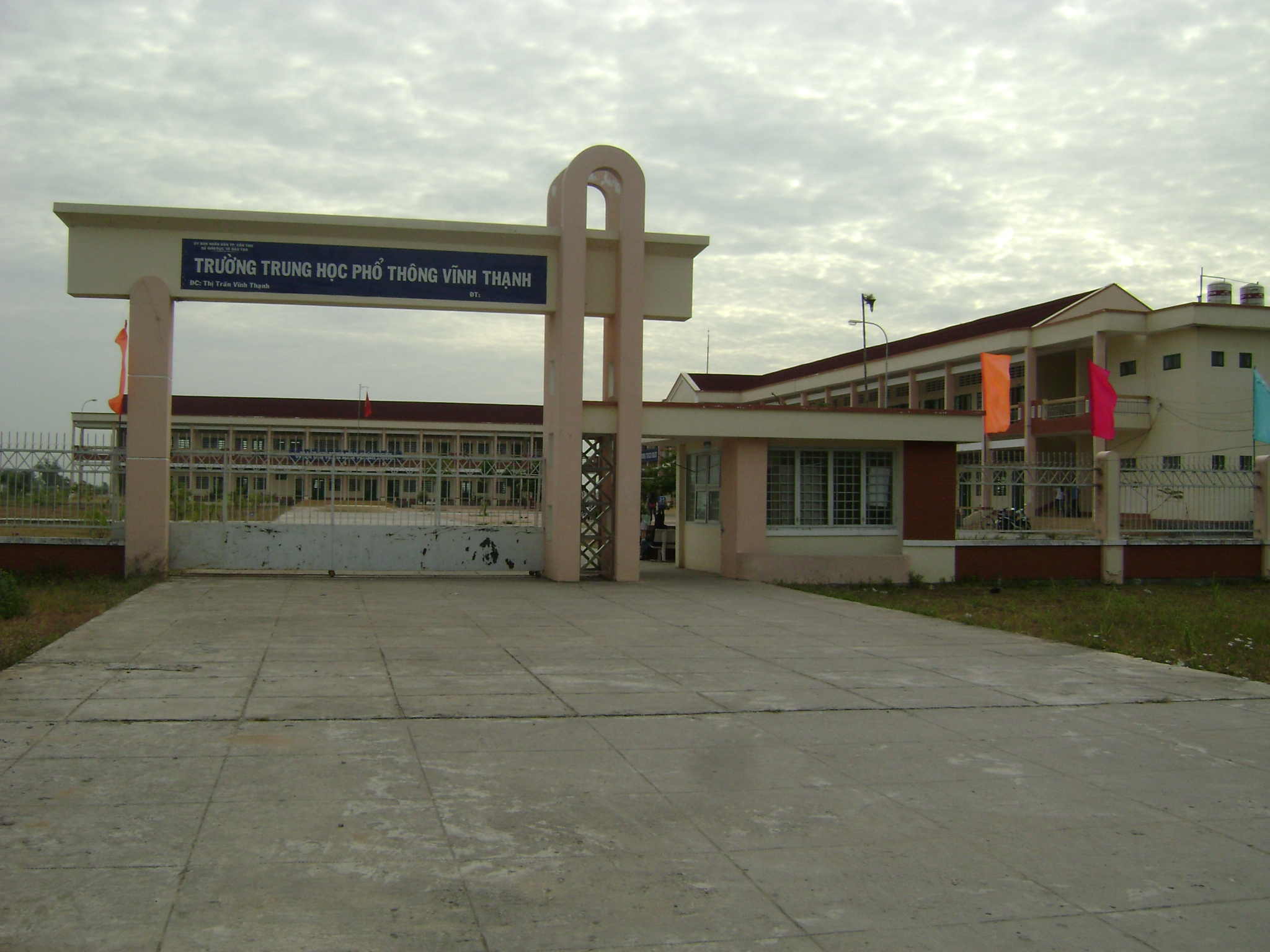

Location
- Vĩnh Thạnh district, Cần Thơ; Vietnam
- Coordinates: 10.2323°N 105.3987°E

Information
- Type: Public
- Established: 2010
- Principal: Phạm Đức Quyền
- Grades: 10-12
- Enrollment: 1,000
- Area: 34.053 sq.meter

Vinh Thanh High School (Vietnamese: Trường Trung học phổ thông Vĩnh Thạnh), one of the three public high schools in Vinh Thanh, was founded in 2010 from Thanh An High School. It is located in Vĩnh Thạnh district, Can Tho City, Vietnam.

== History ==
In 2008, the People's Committee of Can Tho City initiated a plan to locate the school's campus in an area of over 3 hectares in Vinh Thanh Town. After two years of construction, the campus officially came to effect in 2010, with better equipped infrastructure and learning environment.

== Teaching Staff ==
The Principal is Mr. Phạm Đức Quyền, a learned man, majors in Maths. There are about 50 teachers with 7 groups, Literature, English, History-Geography-Civic Education, Maths-Informatics, Physics-Chemistry-Industrial Engineering, Physical Education-National Defense and Biology-Agricultural Engineering. Most teachers are young, qualified experienced and devoted.

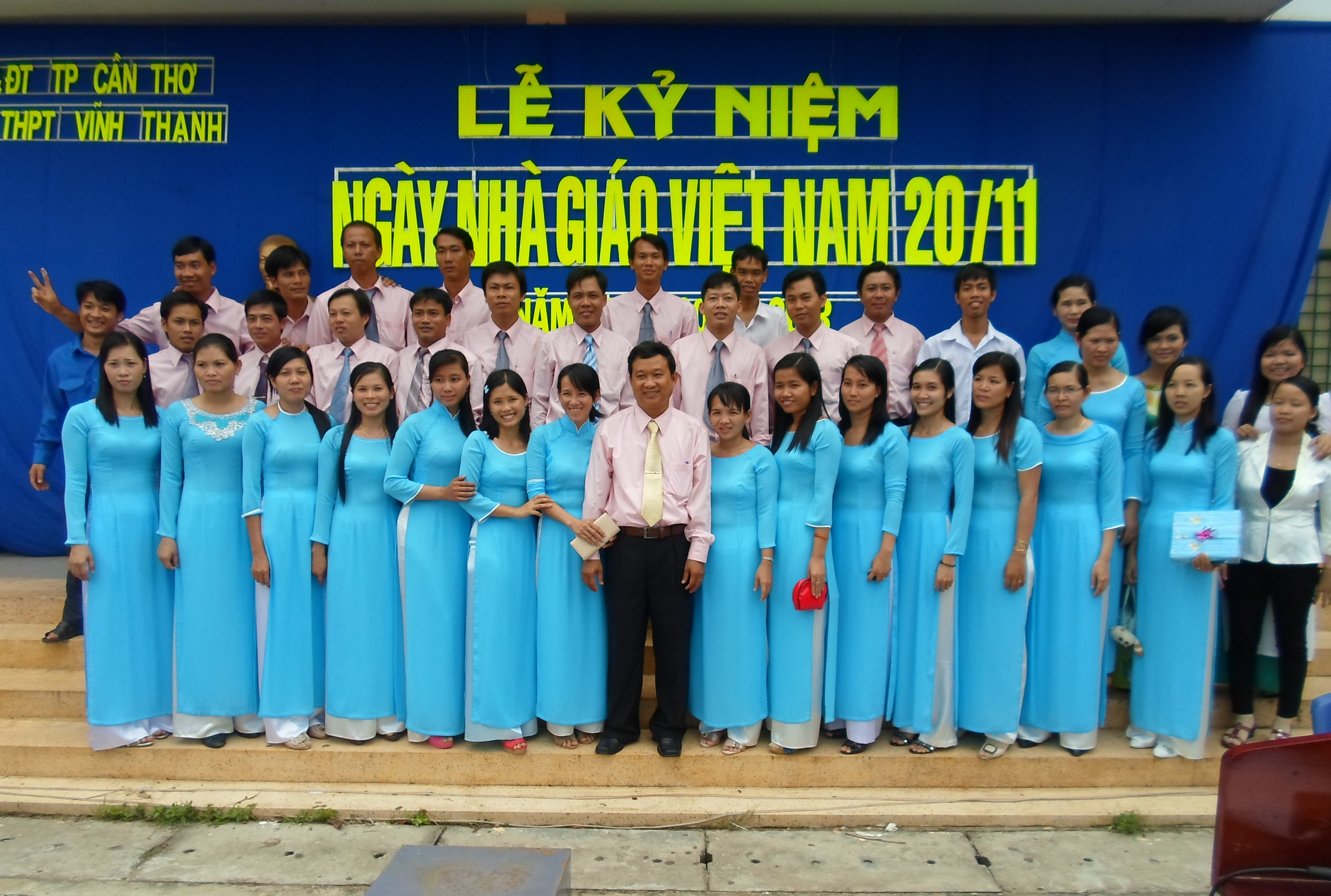
Teaching staff

== Infrastructure ==
The school was located in a large campus (over 3 hectares) in 2010. The city government funded the school to make it a "high-quality school". This brings about more learning space as well as more modern and fully equipped classrooms and laboratories. The campus of the school is recognized as the biggest in Vinh Thanh. It is surrounded by a playground on one side and a garden on the other side. The school has three rows of large buildings. In addition to studying, the school also provides area for recreational and athletic activities including a larger playground, football grounds and a multi-purpose sport center to be built in the next coming years.

== Education ==
Vinh Thanh High School offers each grade 10th, 11th, and 12th special education to help students perform well with their own talents. Students must wear uniforms when at school, which consist of blue pants and white shirts. The girls wear áo dài every Monday. The school functions from 7.00 A.M. to 5 P.M. During the recess hour students can go to the playground or go to the library to read books or newspapers. Games such as football and volleyball are played during break time.

Tuition fee is at the same level with public schools in Vietnam. Apart from the statutory fee, each student has to pay an extra amount of approximately 150,000 VND (US$0,8) per month for the duration of a school year if they wish to apply for the school's special enhancing program for Vietnamese university entrance examination.

=== Admission ===
Students who want to be admitted must take a written examination consisting of three tests: Mathematics, Literature, and English. Approximately 400 students achieving the highest scores in the examination will be chosen from the competitive pool of hundreds of candidates.
