= Thới Lai district =

Coordinates: 9°59′57″N 105°39′40″E

Thới Lai district Huyện Thới Lai
- District
- Interactive map of Thới Lai district
- Country: Vietnam
- City: Cần Thơ
- Capital: Thới Lai

Area
  - Total: 98.71 sq mi (255.66 km^{2})

Population (2018)
  - Total: 147,546
- Time zone: UTC+7 (Indochina Time)

Thới Lai was a rural district (huyện) of Cần Thơ City in the Mekong Delta region of Vietnam. As of 2009 the district had a population of 120,964, rising to 147,546 in 2018. The district covers an area of 255.66 km^{2}. The district capital lies at Thới Lai. The district was formed in 2009 from the southern portion of Cờ Đỏ district.

The district borders Phong Điền and Ô Môn districts to the east, Cờ Đỏ district and Kiên Giang province to the west, Phong Điền District and Hậu Giang province to the south and Cờ Đỏ and Ô Môn districts to the north.

On June 16, 2025, the Standing Committee of the National Assembly issued Resolution No. 1685/NQ-UBTVQH15. The district was dissolved and new wards were rearranged from the district.

== Administrative divisions ==
The district is divided into one commune-level town, Thới Lai, and 13 communes: Thới Thạnh, Tân Thạnh, Định Môn, Trường Thành, Trường Xuân, Trường Xuân A, Trường Xuân B, Trường Thắng, Xuân Thắng, Thới Tân, Đông Bình and Đông Thuận.
