= Ninh Kiều (disambiguation) =

Ninh Kiều could be:

- Ninh Kiều ward, a ward and administrative center of Cần Thơ municipality
- Ninh Kiều district, a former urban district of Cần Thơ municipality
