= Ngã Bảy (city) =

Former provincial city of the former Hậu Giang province, Vietnam

Coordinates: 9°48′59″N 105°49′11″E

- Provincial city
- (Class-3)
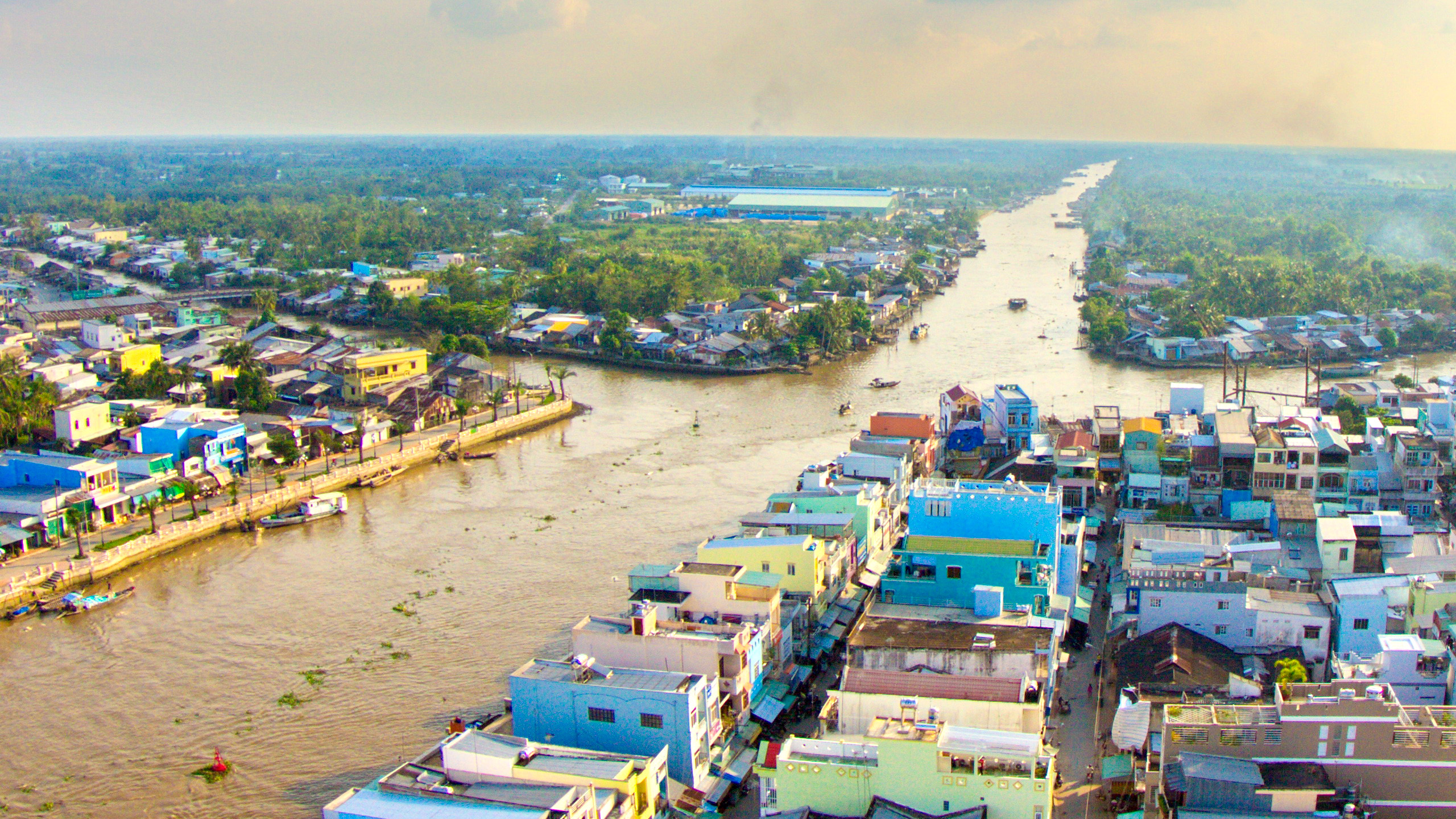
- Interactive map outlining Ngã Bảy
- Location within Vietnam Location within Southeast Asia Location within Asia
- Country: Vietnam
- Region: Mekong Delta
- Province: Hậu Giang
- Dissolution: July 1st, 2025

Government
  - Type: Provincial city

Area
  - Total: 30.48 sq mi (78.95 km^{2})

Population (2019)
  - Total: 101,192
- Time zone: UTC+7 (Indochina Time)

Ngã Bảy is a former provincial city of Hậu Giang province, Vietnam. With a population of 101,192 (2017), it is the biggest city of Hau Giang, surpassing the capital Vị Thanh. It was originally part of Phụng Hiệp district. In 2005, it was split from Phụng Hiệp and was originally named Tân Hiệp, but was met with objections from locals. In late 2006, it was renamed Ngã Bảy, after a popular market in the district. It has a population of 61,024 and an area of 78.9493 km^{2} (2005). It is administratively subdivided into 4 phường (urban wards) (Hiệp Lợi, Hiệp Thành, Lái Hiếu and Ngã Bảy) and 2 xã (rural communes) (Đại Thành and Tân Thành).

"Ngã Bảy" means "The Seven-way Intersection" in Vietnamese. Ngã Bảy city is the meeting place of seven canals (Cái Côn, Quản Lộ - Phụng Hiệp, Lái Hiếu, Mang Cá, Mương Lộ, Xẻo Dong, Xẻo Môn) and is also an important waterway traffic hub in the Mekong Delta.

Ngã Bảy is 30 km from Cần Thơ, 30 km from the city of Sóc Trăng and 40 km from the provincial capital Vị Thanh.

Ngã Bảy borders Sóc Trăng Province to the east, Phụng Hiệp to the west and south and Châu Thành District to the north.

Ngã Bảy is more than 70 km from Vị Thanh by highway, but it is conveniently located for economic developments. It lies on National Road 1A and lies between the regional towns of Cần Thơ and Sóc Trăng.

From 1915, Phụng Hiệp floating market was formed at the intersection of seven different rivers.

The town of Tân Hiệp was established by Government Decree 98/2005/ND-CP, issued on July 26, 2005, which divided the district of Phụng Hiệp into the new town of Tân Hiệp and Phụng Hiệp district. The new name came as a shock to the locals, who protested against it.

== Notable residents ==
- Đinh Thị Thu Thủy (born 1982), blogger and human rights activist.
