= Thới Lai =

Thới Lai Xã Thới Lai
- commune
- Thới Lai commune
- Location within Vietnam
- Coordinates: 10°03′58″N 105°33′36″E
- Country: Vietnam
- Region: Mekong Delta
- Municipality: Cần Thơ
- Time zone: UTC+7 (UTC + 7)

Thới Lai is a commune (xã) of Cần Thơ, Vietnam.
