= Vĩnh Tường, Cần Thơ =

Vĩnh Tường
- Rural commune
- Country: Vietnam
- Province: Cần Thơ
- Time zone: UTC+07:00

Vĩnh Tường is a rural commune (xã) of Cần Thơ, in south-western Vietnam.
