= Cờ Đỏ district =

Coordinates: 10°02′48″N 105°29′46″E

Co Do district Huyện Cờ Đỏ
- District
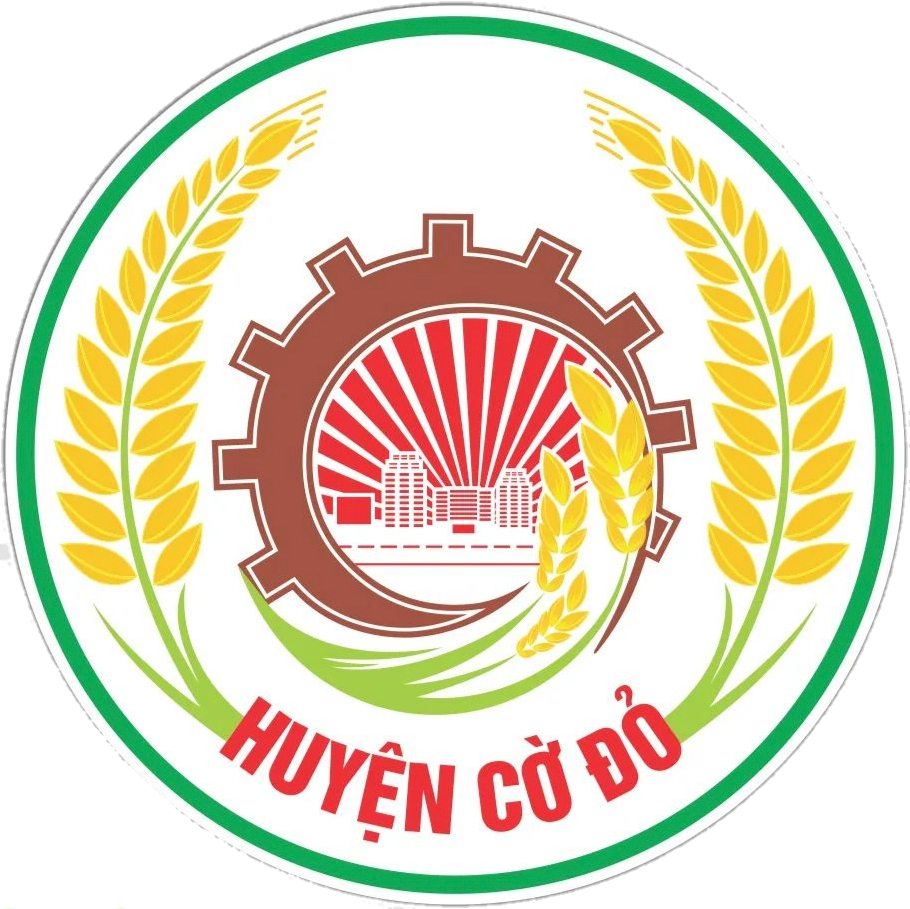
- Seal
- Interactive map of Co Do district
- Country: Vietnam
- Province: Cần Thơ
- Capital: Thới Lai

Area
  - Total: 156 sq mi (403 km^{2})

Population (2003)
  - Total: 158,467
  - Density: 1,020/sq mi (393/km^{2})
- Time zone: UTC+7 (Indochina Time)

Cờ Đỏ was a rural district (huyện) of Cần Thơ in the Mekong Delta region of Vietnam. As of 2003 the district had a population of 158,467. The district covers an area of 403 km^{2}. The district capital lies at Thới Lai.

== Geographical Location ==
The district borders Vĩnh Thạnh district to the west, Kiên Giang province to the southwest and Thốt Nốt district to the north.

== History ==
The district was established under Decree No. 05/2004/ND-CP on January 2, 2004.

On June 16, 2025, the Standing Committee of the National Assembly issued Resolution No. 1685/NQ-UBTVQH15. The district was dissolved and new wards were rearranged from the district.

== Administrative divisions ==
The district is divided into one urban municipality, Cờ Đỏ, and 9 communes: Thới Hưng, Đông Hiệp, Đông Thắng, Thới Đông, Thới Xuân, Trung Hưng, Thạnh Phú, Cần Thơ, Trung An and Trung Thạnh.
