= Vĩnh Thạnh district, Cần Thơ =

Coordinates: 10°11′35″N 105°22′45″E

Vĩnh Thạnh district Huyện Vĩnh Thạnh
- District
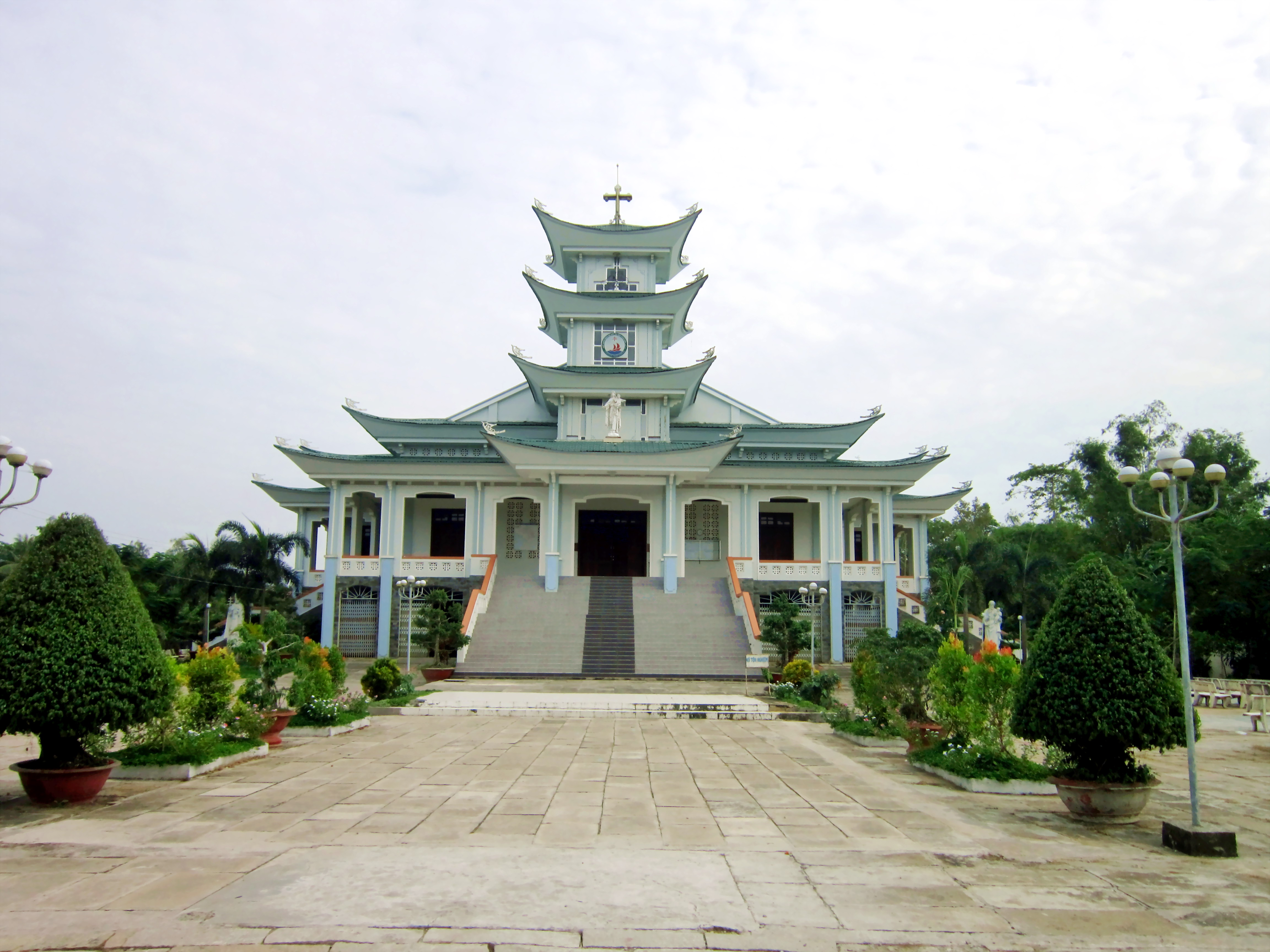
- In front of Môi Khôi temple
- Interactive map of Vĩnh Thạnh district
- Country: Vietnam
- Province: Cần Thơ
- Capital: Vĩnh Thạnh

Area
  - Total: 160 sq mi (410 km^{2})

Population (2007)
  - Total: 162,759
  - Density: 1,030/sq mi (397/km^{2})
- Time zone: UTC+7 (Indochina Time)

Vĩnh Thạnh is a rural district of Cần Thơ city in the Mekong Delta region of Vietnam. The district borders An Giang province to the west, Kiên Giang province to the south and Thốt Nốt district to the north. As of 2004 the district had a population of 155,011. By 2007 this had risen to 162,759. The district covers an area of 410 km^{2} (160 sq mi). The district capital lies at Vĩnh Thạnh.

== History ==
Vĩnh Thạnh district was established in May 2004 by Decree No. 05/2004/ND-CP.

On June 16, 2025, the Standing Committee of the National Assembly issued Resolution No. 1685/NQ-UBTVQH15. The district was dissolved and new wards were rearranged from the district.

== Administrative divisions ==
The district consists of two towns, the urban municipalities of Thạnh An and Vĩnh Thạnh, and 9 communes: Vĩnh Trinh, Vĩnh Bình, Thạnh Mỹ, Thạnh Quới, Thạnh An, Thạnh Tiến, Thạnh Thắng, Thạnh Lợi and Thạnh Lộc.

== Leaders' Information ==
- Chairman of the People Committee: Vo Van Phuong
- Vice Chairman of the People Committee: Doan Trung Kien
- Vice Chairman of the People Committee: Do Si Nhuong

== Education ==
Vĩnh Thạnh has 3 high schools. Vĩnh Thạnh High School is in Vĩnh Thạnh Town with more than 800 students from grades 10 to 12. Vĩnh Thạnh High School is in Thạnh An Town with more than 1200 students from grades 10 to 12. Thạnh Thắng Lower and Upper Secondary Schools are in Thạnh Thắng Commune with more than 1500 students.
