= Châu Thành, Cần Thơ =

Châu Thành
- Rural commune
- Country: Vietnam
- Province: Cần Thơ
- Time zone: UTC+07:00

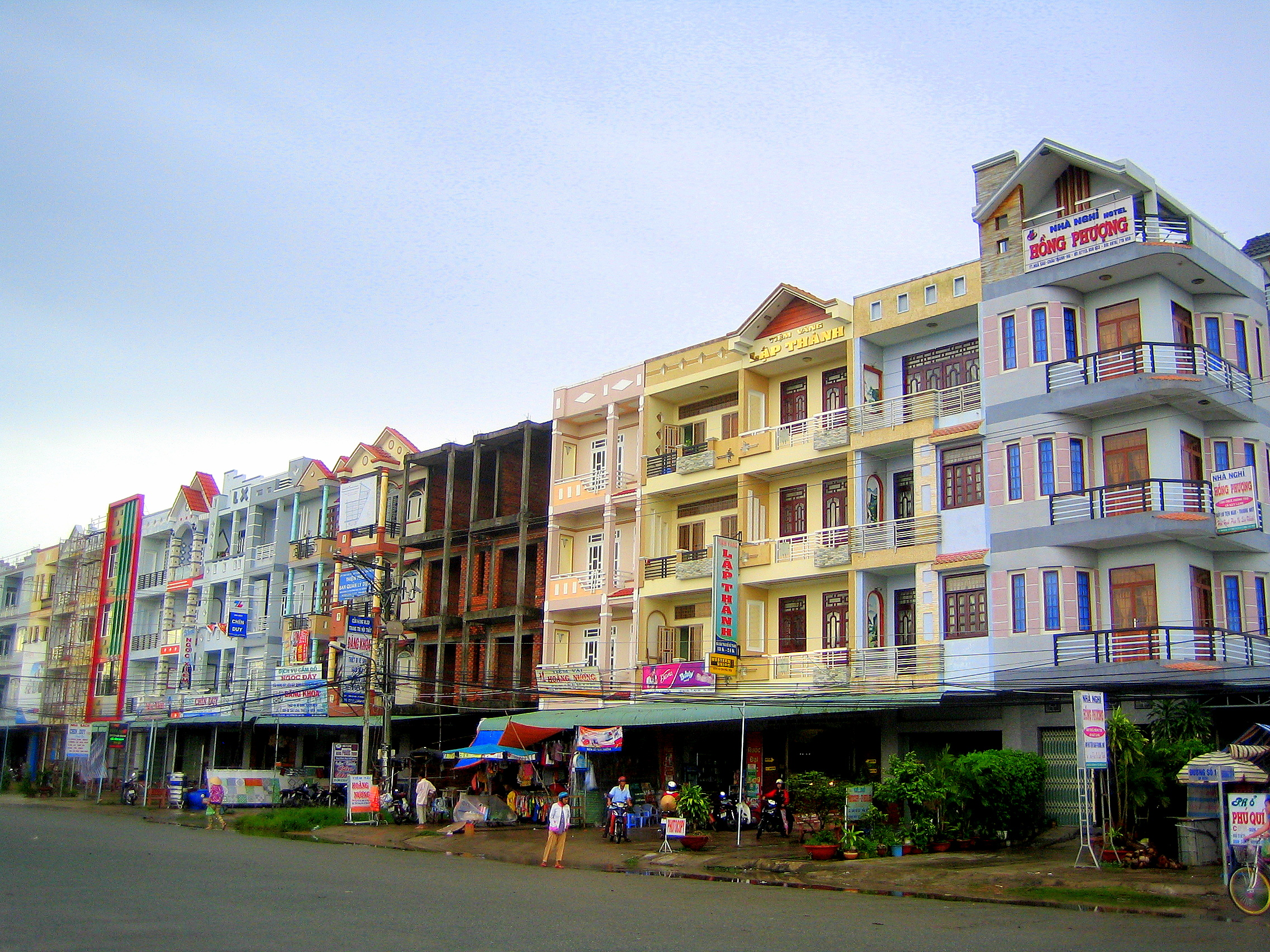
Nga Sau town is center of Chau Thanh, Hau Giang

Châu Thành is a rural commune (xã) of Cần Thơ, in south-western Vietnam. It is one of the 103 new wards and communes of the city following the reorganization in 2025.

On June 16, 2025, the Standing Committee of the National Assembly issued Resolution No. 1668/NQ-UBTVQH15 on the arrangement of commune-level administrative units in Cần Thơ in 2025. Accordingly, Châu Thành Commune was established in Cần Thơ by merging the entire natural area and population of Mái Dầm Township, Ngã Sáu Township, and Đông Phú Commune, formerly in Châu Thành District, Hậu Giang Province.
