= Ô Môn district =

Coordinates: 10°04′12″N 105°22′12″E

Ô Môn district Quận Ô Môn
- Urban district
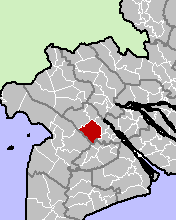
- Location in Cần Thơ province.
- Country: Vietnam
- Province: Cần Thơ

Area
  - Land: 49 sq mi (126 km^{2})

Population (2018)
  - Total: 164,234
  - Density: 3,380/sq mi (1,300/km^{2})
- Time zone: UTC+7 (Indochina Time)

Ô Môn was an urban district (quận) of Cần Thơ in the Mekong Delta region of Vietnam. As of 2004 the district had a population of 128,075, and 164,234 people in 2018. The district covers an area of 126 km^{2}.

== Histoty ==
The district was created by Decree No. 05/2004/ND-CP dated January 2, 2004.

On June 16, 2025, the Standing Committee of the National Assembly issued Resolution No. 1685/NQ-UBTVQH15. The district was dissolved and new wards were rearranged from the district.

== Wards ==
The administration consists of 7 wards:

- Châu Văn Liêm Ward: 22,719 people (2007)
- Thới Hòa Ward: 7,766 people (2007)
- An Thới Ward: 26,474 people (2004)
- Phước Thới Ward: 20,193 people (2004)
- Trường Lạc Ward: 15,803 people (2004)
- Thới Long Ward: 20,609 people (2007)
- Long Hưng Ward: 14,029 people (2007)
