= Thạnh An, Cần Thơ =

Thạnh An Xã Thạnh An
- Commune
- Thạnh An commune
- Location within Vietnam
- Coordinates: 10°09′20″N 105°19′27″E
- Country: Vietnam
- Region: Mekong Delta
- Municipality: Cần Thơ
- Time zone: UTC+7 (UTC + 7)

Thạnh An is a commune (xã) of Cần Thơ, Vietnam.
