= Vĩnh Thạnh, Cần Thơ =

Vĩnh Thạnh Xã Vĩnh Thạnh
- Commune
- Vĩnh Thạnh commune
- Location within Vietnam
- Coordinates: 10°13′44″N 105°23′54″E
- Country: Vietnam
- Region: Mekong Delta
- Municipality: Cần Thơ
- Time zone: UTC+7 (UTC + 7)

Vĩnh Thạnh is a commune (xã) of Cần Thơ, Vietnam.
