= Phụng Hiệp =

- Commune
- Interactive map of Phụng Hiệp
- Coordinates: 9°49′36″N 105°46′32″E
- Country: Vietnam
- Municipality: Cần Thơ
- Region: Mekong Delta
- Seat: No. 359, Provincial Road 928, Ấp Mỹ Thành

Area
  - Total: 66.78 km^{2} (25.78 sq mi)

Population (31 December 2024)
  - Total: 33,408
  - Density: 500/km^{2} (1,300/sq mi)
- Website: phunghiep.cantho.gov.vn

Phụng Hiệp is a commune in Cần Thơ, Vietnam.

On 12 June 2025, the National Assembly of Vietnam adopted Resolution No. 202/2025/QH15 on the reorganization of provincial-level administrative units, which took effect on the same date. Under the resolution, Hậu Giang province and Sóc Trăng province were merged into Cần Thơ.

On 16 June 2025:

- The National Assembly of Vietnam adopted Resolution No. 203/2025/QH15 on amendments and supplements to several articles of the Constitution of the Socialist Republic of Vietnam. Under the resolution, district-level administrative units nationwide ceased operations from 1 July 2025.
- The Standing Committee of the National Assembly of Vietnam adopted Resolution No. 1668/NQ-UBTVQH15 on the reorganization of commune-level administrative units in Cần Thơ in 2025. Under the resolution, Phụng Hiệp commune was established in Cần Thơ from the entire area and population of Hòa Mỹ and Phụng Hiệp communes in the former Phụng Hiệp district, Hậu Giang province.
