= Hiệp Hưng =

- Commune
- Location in Vietnam
- Coordinates: 9°45′43″N 105°44′22″E
- Country: Vietnam
- Province: Cần Thơ
- Time zone: UTC+7 (UTC+7)

Hiệp Hưng is a village and commune of Cần Thơ, Vietnam.
