= Thanh An, Điện Biên =

Coordinates: 21.3336°N 103.0389°E

Thanh An
- Commune and village
- Interactive map of Thanh An
- Country: Vietnam
- Province: Điện Biên
- Time zone: UTC+07:00 (Indochina Time)

Thanh An is a commune (xã) and village of the Điện Biên Province, northwestern Vietnam.

The entire natural area and population of Noong Hẹt Commune, Sam Mứn Commune, and Thanh An Commune are reorganized to form a new commune named Thanh An Commune.
