= Ninh Kiều =

Ward and capital of Cần Thơ city, Vietnam

- Ward
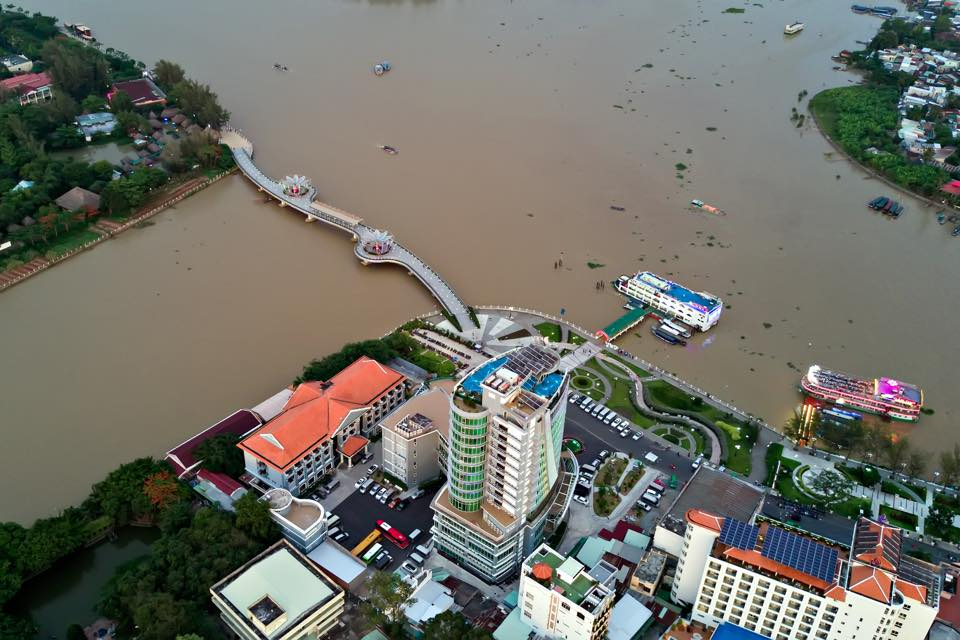
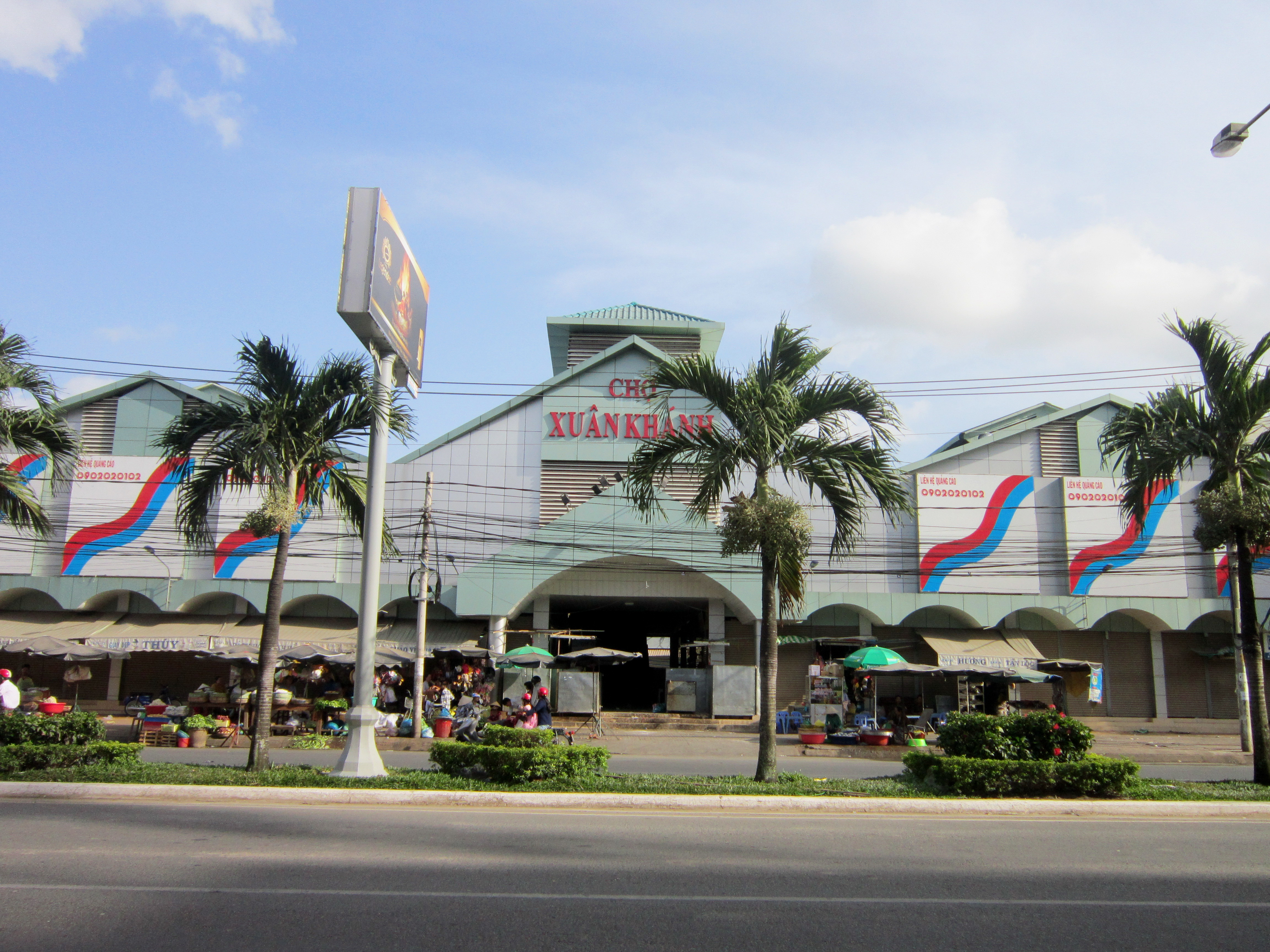
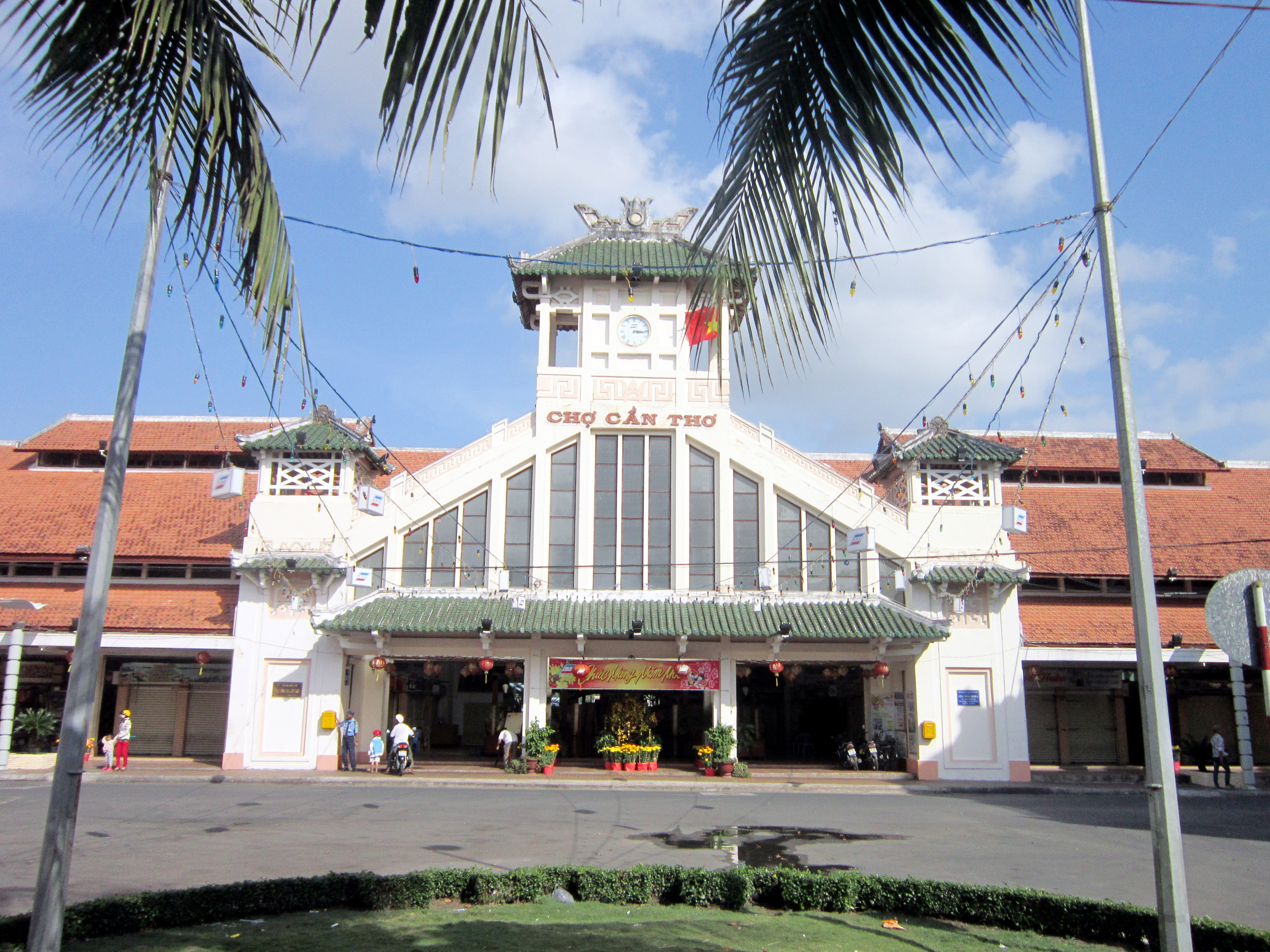
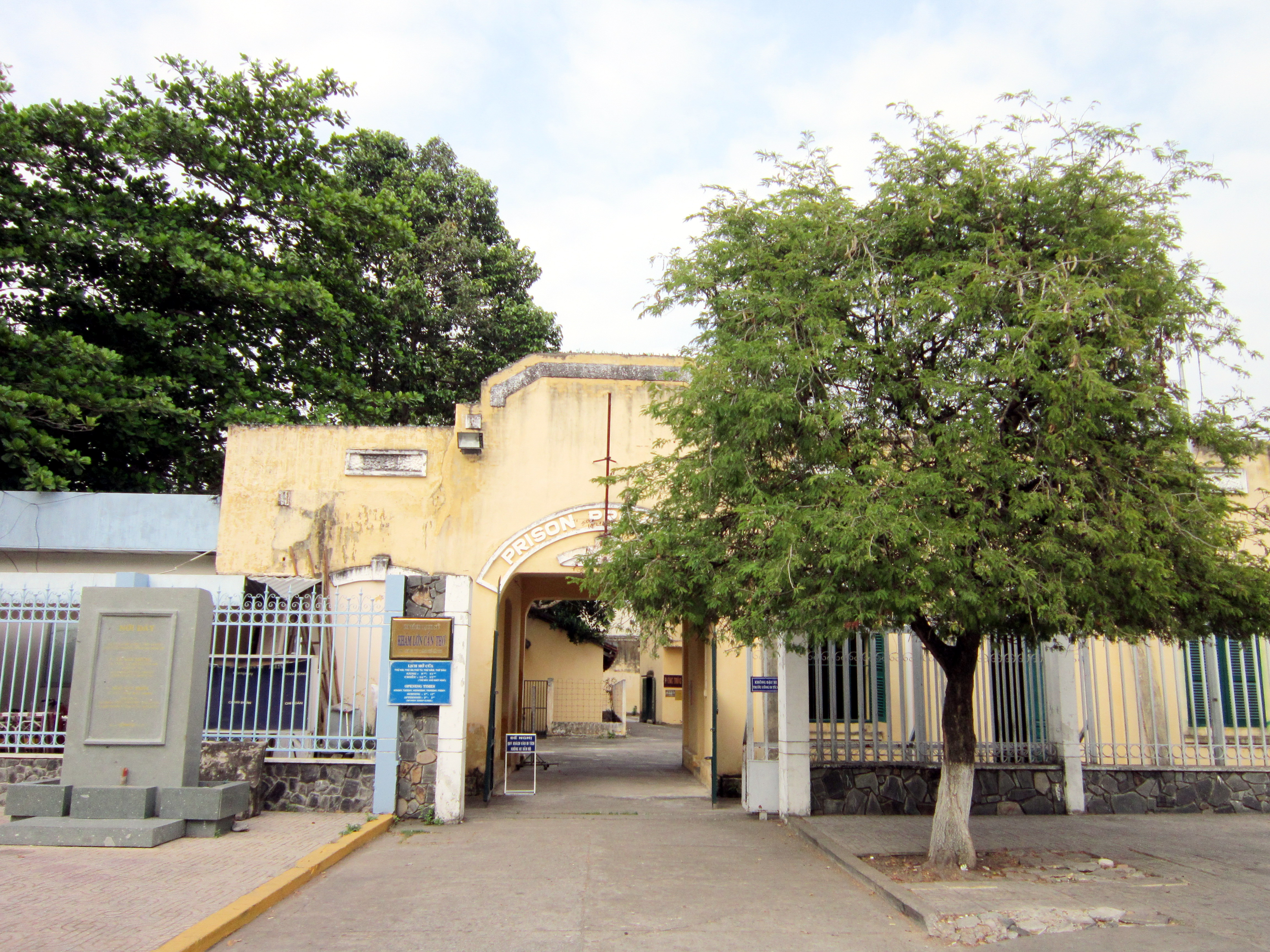
- From top to bottom, from left to right: Ninh Kiều wharf, Xuân Khánh market, Cần Thơ market, Cần Thơ grand prison historical site
- Country: Vietnam
- Centrally- governed city: Cần Thơ
- Establish: June 16, 2025
- Headquarters of the People's Committee: 215, Nguyễn Trãi street, Ninh Kiều ward

Area
  - Total: 5.42 km^{2} (2.09 sq mi)

Population (2025)
  - Total: 119,547 people
  - Density: 22,056/km^{2} (57,120/sq mi)

Ninh Kiều is a ward in Cần Thơ city, Vietnam. It is one of 103 wards and communes in the city after the 2025 reorganization. Ninh Kiều ward is the administrative center of Cần Thơ city.

== Geography ==
Ninh Kiều ward is where the headquarters of the People's Committee of Cần Thơ city is located. The ward has the following geographical location:

- To the east and north, it borders Cái Khế ward.
- To the west, it borders Tân An ward.
- To the south, it borders Hưng Phú ward.

== History ==
Prior to 2025, Ninh Kiều ward was formerly Tân An ward, Thới Bình ward, and Xuân Khánh ward belonging to Ninh Kiều urban district, Cần Thơ city.

On June 12, 2025, the National Assembly of Vietnam issued Resolution No. 202/2025/QH15 on the reorganization of provincial-level administrative units. Accordingly:

- Cần Thơ city was established by merging the entire area and population of Cần Thơ city, Hậu Giang province, and Sóc Trăng province.
- After the reorganization, Cần Thơ city will have an area of 6,360.83 km^{2}, a population (in 2025) of 4,199,824 people, and a density of 660 people/km^{2}.
- Cần Thơ municipality borders An Giang province to the northwest and north, Cà Mau province to the southwest, Đồng Tháp province to the northeast, Vĩnh Long province to the east, East Sea to the south.

On June 16, 2025, the Standing Committee of the National Assembly of Vietnam issued Resolution No. 1668/NQ-UBTVQH15 on the reorganization of commune-level administrative units in Cần Thơ city. Accordingly:

- Ninh Kiều ward was established by merging the entire area and population of Tân An ward, Thới Bình ward, and Xuân Khánh ward (formerly part of Ninh Kiều urban district).
- After the reorganization, Ninh Kiều ward has an area of 5.42 km^{2}, a population of 119,567 people, and a population density of 22,056 people/km^{2}.
