= Phụng Hiệp district =

Coordinates: 9.800°N 105.750°E

Phụng Hiệp district Huyện Phụng Hiệp
- District
- Seal

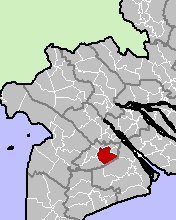
- Location in Hậu Giang province
- Country: Vietnam
- Region: Mekong Delta
- Province: Hậu Giang

Area
  - Total: 187.19 sq mi (484.81 km^{2})

Population (2018)
  - Total: 210,089
- Time zone: UTC+7 (Indochina Time)

Phụng Hiệp is a former rural district (huyện) of Hậu Giang province in the Mekong Delta region of Vietnam. The district is split into 3 commune-level towns Cây Dương (capital), Búng Tàu and Kinh Cùng, and 12 rural communes: Bình Thành, Hiệp Hưng, Hòa An, Hòa Mỹ, Long Thạnh, Phụng Hiệp, Phương Bình, Phương Phú, Tân Bình, Tân Long, Tân Phước Hưng, Thạnh Hòa.
