= Cần Thơ =

Centrally-governed city of Vietnam

- Centrally-governed city
- (Class-1)
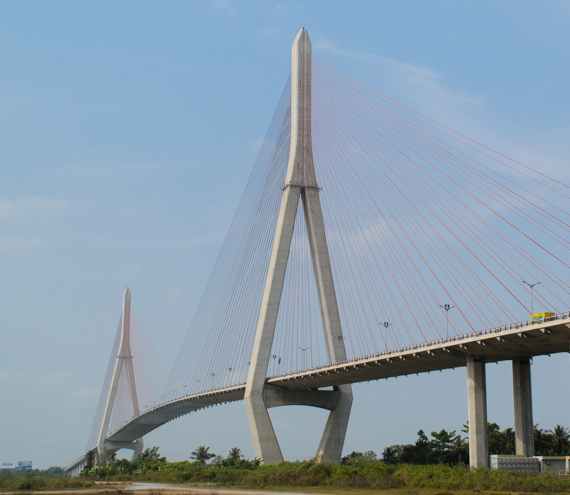
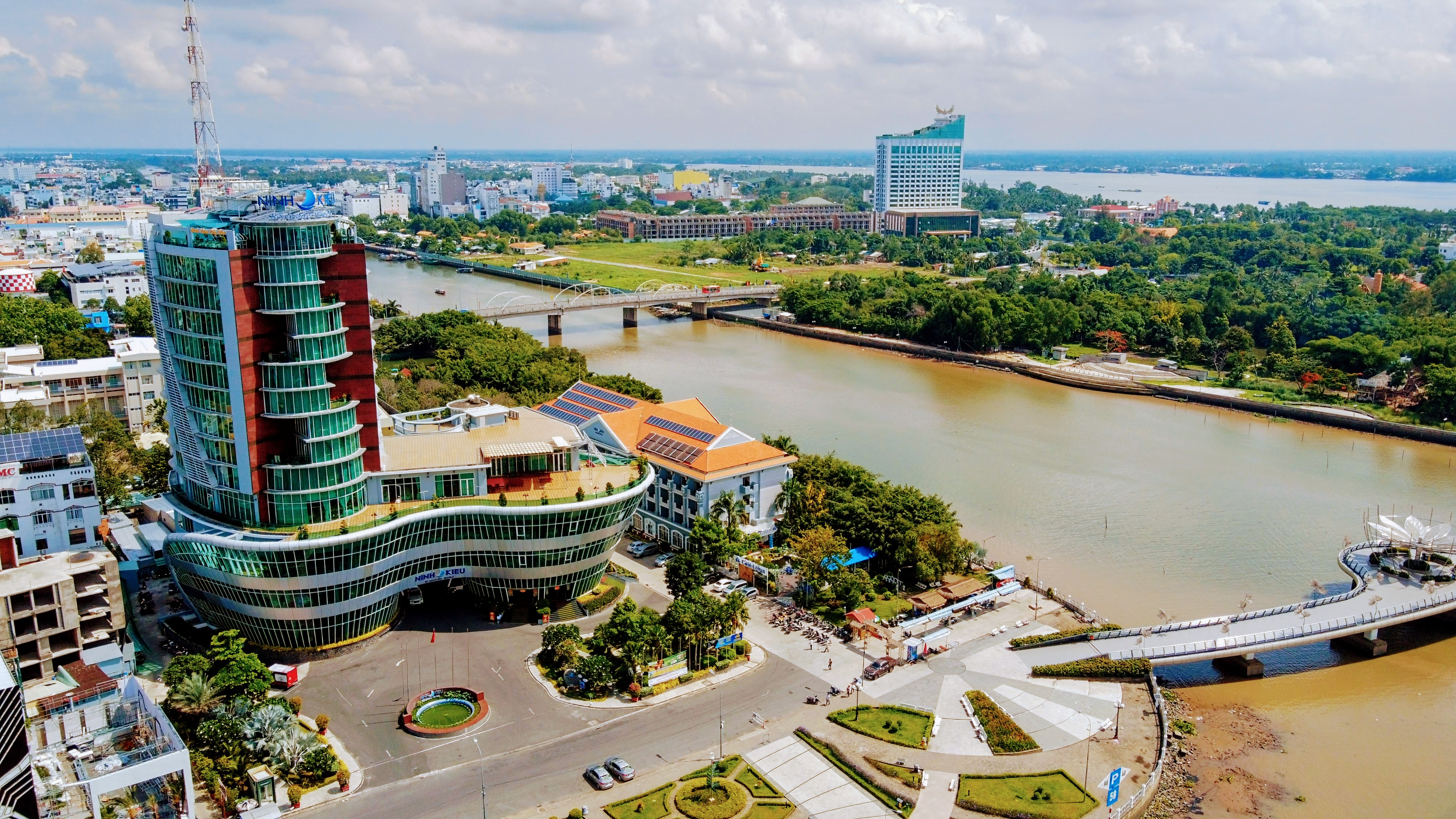
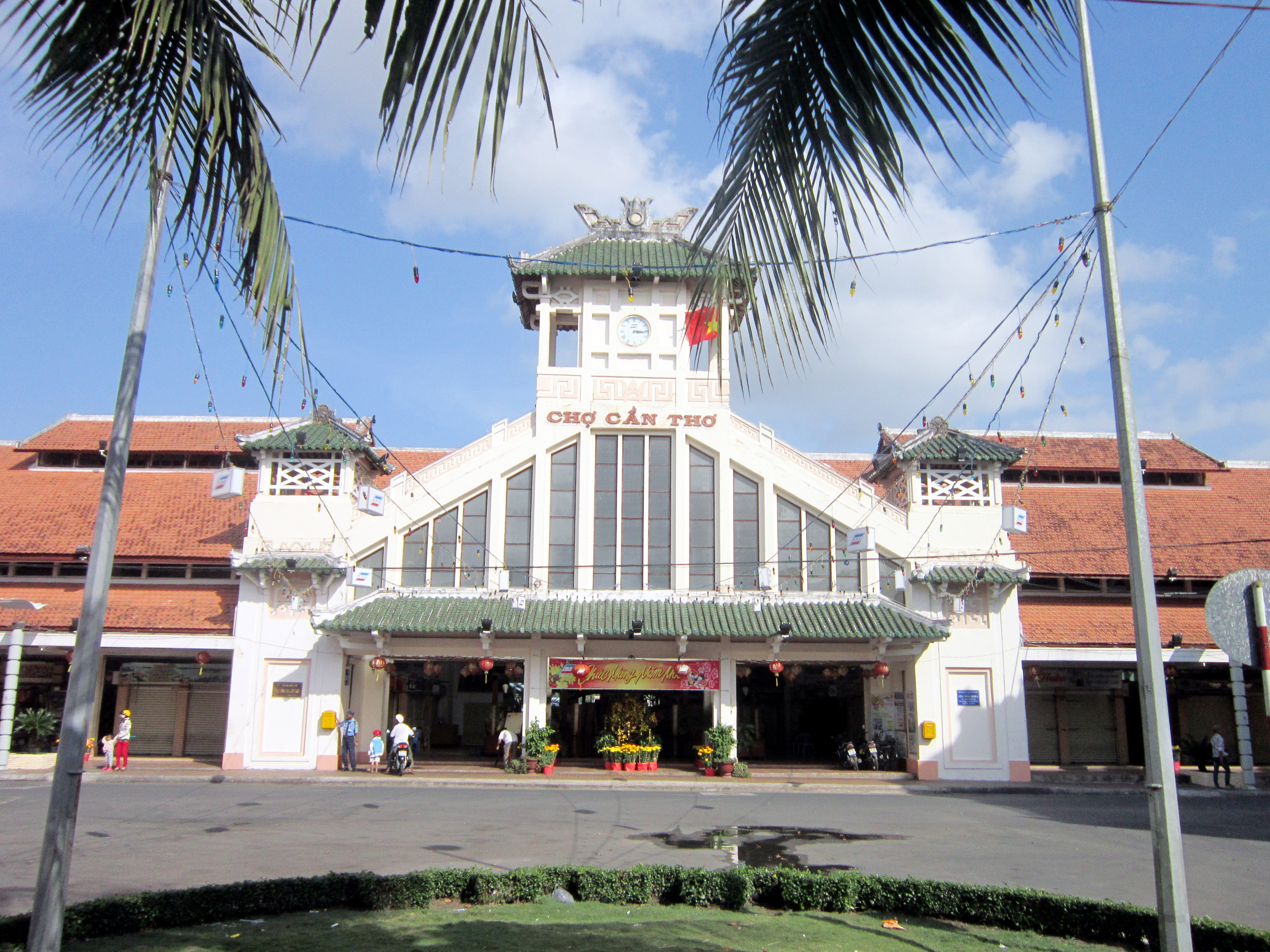
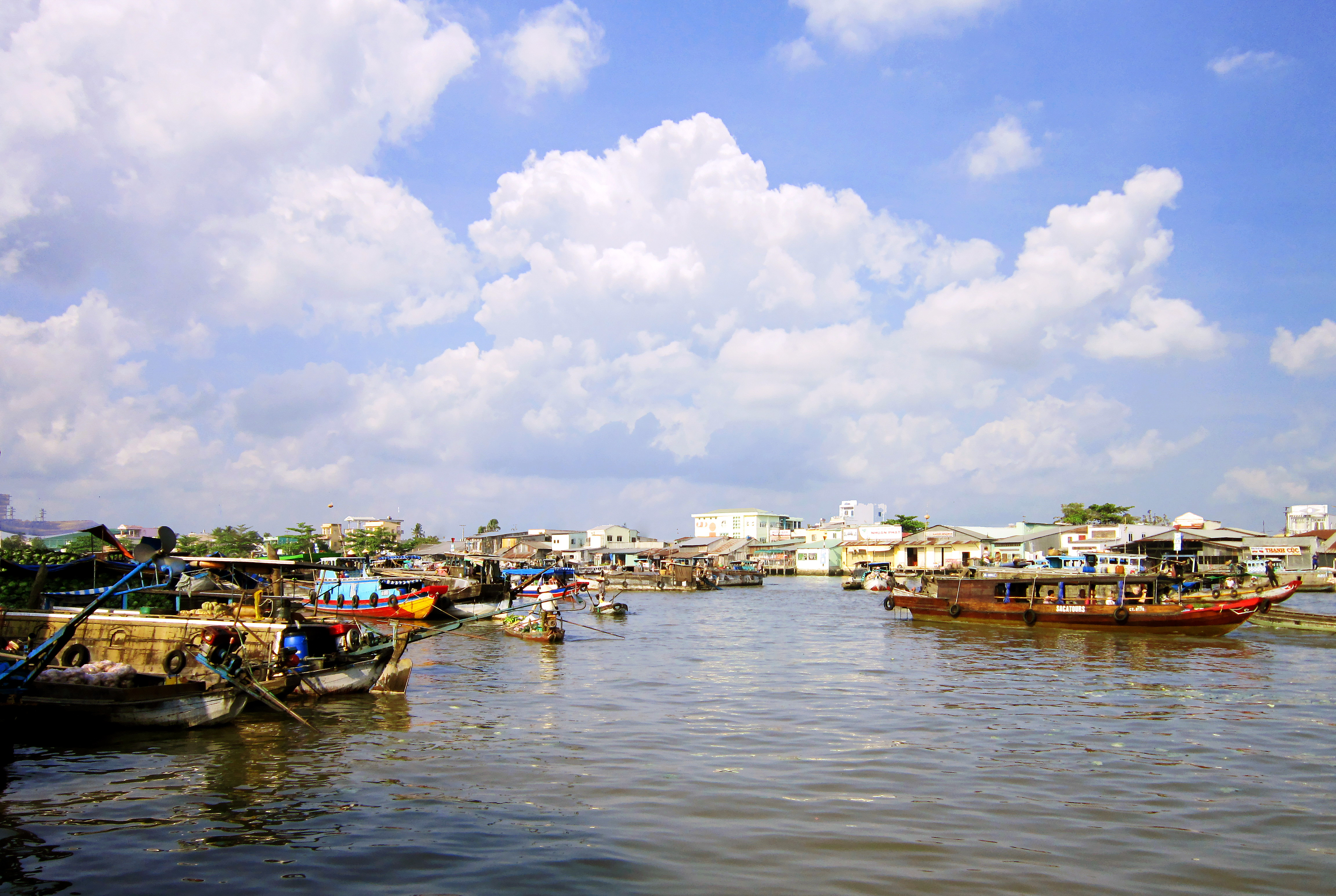
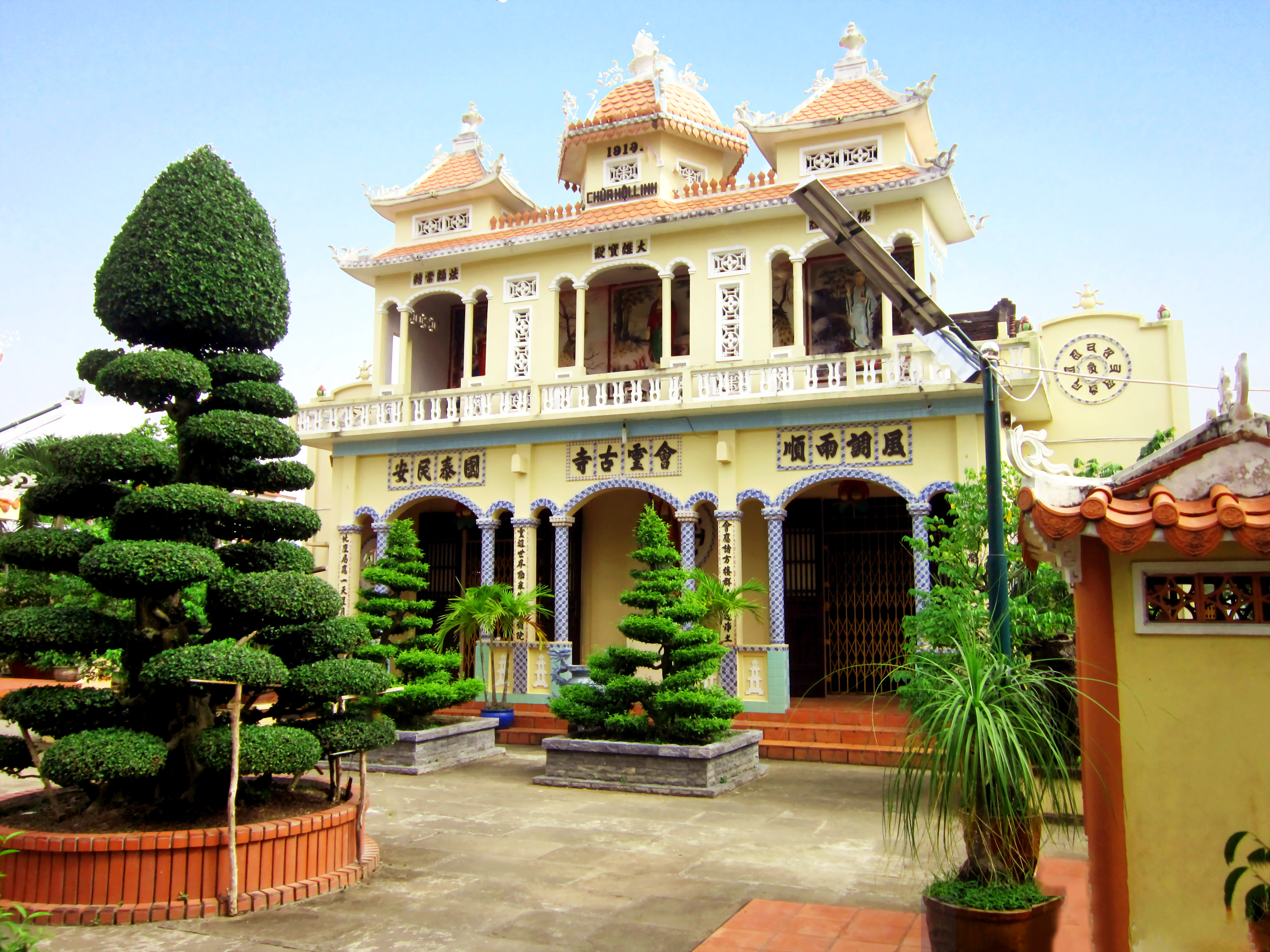
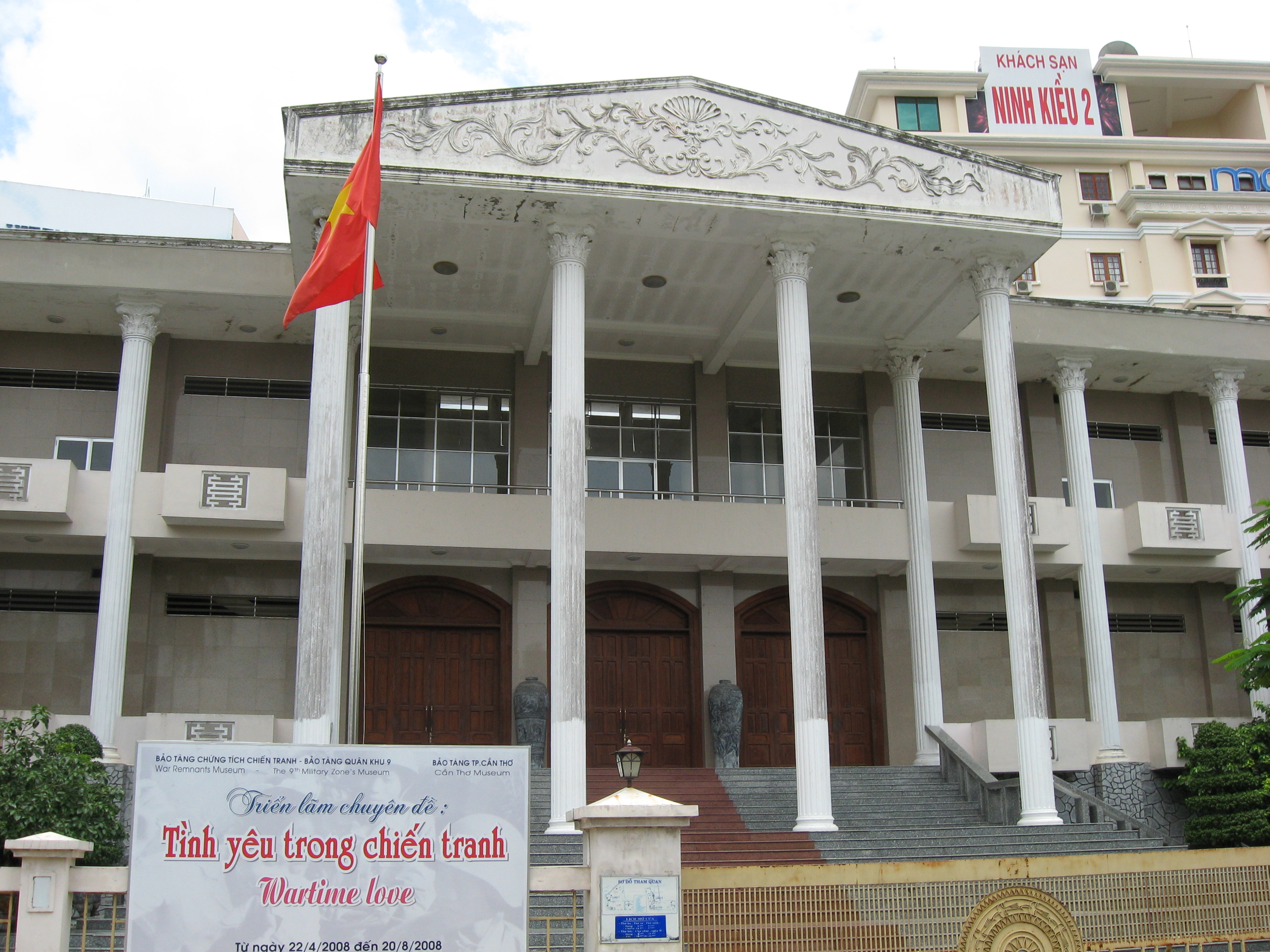

- Seal

- Interactive map of Cần Thơ
- Coordinates: 10°02′N 105°47′E
- Country: Vietnam
- Region: Mekong Delta
- Founded: 2004
- Capital: Ninh Kiều ward
- Subdivision: 31 wards, 72 communes

Government
  - Type: Centrally- governed city
  - Body: Cần Thơ City People's Council
  - Secretary of the Party: Đỗ Thanh Bình
  - Chairman of People's Council: Đồng Văn Thanh
  - Chairman of People's Committee: Trương Cảnh Tuyên

Area
  - Total: 6,360.83 km^{2} (2,455.93 sq mi)

Population (2024)
  - Total: 4,199,824
  - Density: 660/km^{2} (1,700/sq mi)

Ethnic groups
  - Vietnamese: 97.47%
  - Khmer: 1.59%
  - Hoa: 0.88%
  - Others: 0.06%

GDP (PPP, constant 2025 values)
  - Year: 2025
  - Total: $11,05 billion
  - Per capita: $3,801.49
- Time zone: UTC+07:00 (ICT)
- Postal code: 94xxx
- Area codes: 292
- ISO 3166 code: VN-CT
- License plate: 65
- HDI (2020): ▲0.742 (16th)
- Climate: Aw
- International airports: Can Tho International Airport
- Website: cantho.gov.vn

Cần Thơ (Vietnamese pronunciation: [kən˨˩ tʰɤ˧]) is the third largest centrally-governed city in Vietnam and is in the Mekong Delta region. It is noted for its floating markets, Bánh tráng-making village, and rural canals. Cần Thơ has a population of around 4,199,824 as of 2024.

On June 12, 2025, the National Assembly passed Resolution No. 202/2025/QH15, which took effect the same day, merging Hậu Giang Province and Sóc Trăng Province into Cần Thơ municipality. Ninh Kiều, which has the Ninh Kiều port, is the former central district and the most populated of the former districts.

== Geography ==
Cần Thơ city has the following geographical location:

- To the southwest, it borders Cà Mau province.
- To the west and north, it borders An Giang province.
- To the east, it borders Vĩnh Long province.
- To the northeast, it borders Đồng Tháp province.
- To the south, it borders the East Sea.

Cần Thơ has a complex of rivers and canals such as Hậu, Cần Thơ River, Thốt Nốt, Ô Môn Canals. And Hậu River is considered a benefactor of this region.

== Administrative divisions ==
Administrative divisions in Cần Thơ.

After the 2025 reorganization, Cần Thơ city will be divided into 103 commune-level administrative units, including 31 wards and 72 communes:

- 31 wards: Ninh Kiều (capital), An Bình, Bình Thủy, Cái Khế, Cái Răng, Đại Thành, Hưng Phú, Khánh Hòa, Long Bình, Long Mỹ, Long Phú 1, Long Tuyền, Mỹ Quới, Mỹ Xuyên, Ngã Bảy, Ngã Năm, Ô Môn, Phú Lợi, Phước Thới, Sóc Trăng, Tân An, Tân Lộc, Thốt Nốt, Thới An Đông, Thới Long, Thuận Hưng, Trung Nhứt, Vị Tân, Vị Thanh, Vĩnh Châu, Vĩnh Phước.
- 72 communes: An Lạc Thôn, An Ninh, An Thạnh, Châu Thành, Cờ Đỏ, Cù Lao Dung, Đại Hải, Đại Ngãi, Đông Hiệp, Đông Phước, Đông Thuận, Gia Hòa, Hiệp Hưng, Hòa An, Hỏa Lựu, Hòa Tú, Hồ Đắc Kiện, Kế Sách, Lai Hòa, Lâm Tân, Lịch Hội Thượng, Liêu Tú, Long Hưng, Long Phú, Lương Tâm, Mỹ Hương, Mỹ Phước, Mỹ Tú, Ngọc Tố, Nhu Gia, Nhơn Ái, Nhơn Mỹ, Phong Điền, Phong Nẫm, Phú Hữu, Phú Lộc, Phú Tâm, Phụng Hiệp, Phương Bình, Tài Văn, Tân Bình, Tân Hòa, Tân Long, Tân Phước Hưng, Tân Thạnh, Thạnh An, Thạnh Hòa, Thạnh Phú, Thạnh Quới, Thạnh Thới An, Thạnh Xuân, Thới An Hội, Thới Hưng, Thới Lai, Thuận Hòa, Trần Đề, Trung Hưng, Trường Khánh, Trường Long, Trường Long Tây, Trường Thành, Trường Xuân, Vị Thanh 1, Vị Thủy, Vĩnh Hải, Vĩnh Lợi, Vĩnh Thạnh, Vĩnh Thuận Đông, Vĩnh Trinh, Vĩnh Tường, Vĩnh Viễn, Xà Phiên.

== Tourism ==
Nam Nhã pagoda

Can Tho is known for attractions such as Cai Rang Floating Market, Ninh Kieu Wharf, and Truc Lam Phuong Nam Zen Monastery. Visitors from Ho Chi Minh City can follow National Highway 1A to Can Tho City. The travel distance is about 170 kilometers, taking 3 to 4 hours during the day. Cần Thơ (shared with Hậu Giang) has floating markets, including the Cai Rang floating market, where people sell and buy things on the river, and has bird gardens and the port of Ninh Kiều. The city offers a range of tropical fruits such as pomelo, longan, jackfruit, mango, guava, banana, rambutan, mangosteen, dragon fruit and durian. The Cần Thơ City Museum has exhibits on the city's history.

From Phú Quốc island, tourists can use the ferry, passenger bus or taxi to transfer to Cần Thơ.

Attractions:

- Cần Thơ Bridge
- Thiền viện Trúc Lâm Phương Nam (Buddhist temple)
- Nam Nhã Pagoda
- Bình Thủy Temple
- The historic Bình Thủy house (nhà cổ Bình Thủy, 1870): a mix of French and Asian architecture
- Ninh Kiều Quay
- Cần Thơ pedestrian bridge
- Cái Răng Floating Market & Phong Điền Floating Market
- Bằng Lăng Stork Sanctuary (Thốt Nốt district)
- Canal tour
- Cần Thơ Cathedral
- Ông Chinese Pagoda
- Pitu Khôsa Răngsây Khmer Pagoda
- Quang Đức Pagoda
- Lưu Hữu Phước Park
- Phật Học Pagoda
- Mỹ Khánh tourist village
- Cần Thơ seminary
- Sơn Islet
- Cần Thơ Museum
- Hùng Kings Temple (Cần Thơ)
- Tây Đô Night Market

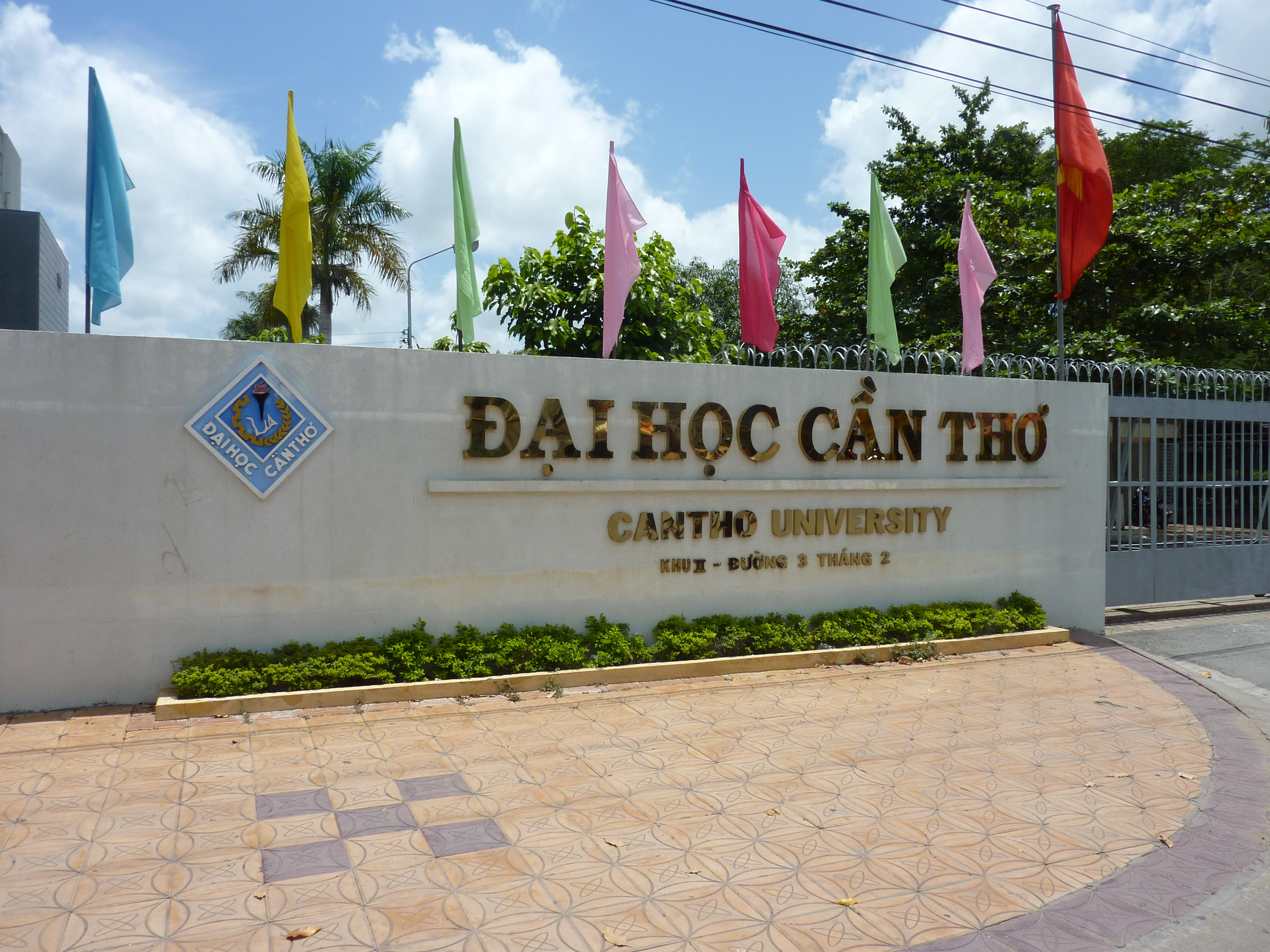
Cần Thơ University

== Education ==
Academic institutions in the municipality are Cần Thơ University, Cần Thơ Department of Education and Training, Cần Thơ University of Medicine and Pharmacy, Tây Đô University, Nam Cần Thơ University, Cần Thơ College, College of Foreign Economic Relations – Cần Thơ Branch, Medical College, Singapore International School at Can Tho, and Cần Thơ Technical Economic College.

== Media ==
Vietnam Television has a studio located in the Ninh Kiều district of the city which broadcast local news and television programmes for the Mekong Delta region of Vietnam that broadcast on the channel VTV Cần Thơ and for VTV9.

== Transport ==
The municipality is served by Cần Thơ International Airport which is located 9 km (6 mi) north west of the municipal centre. The airport provides direct routes to other parts of Vietnam such as Hanoi, Da Nang, Hai Phong, Ha Long, Phu Quoc and Côn Đảo which are operated by Vietnam Airlines, VietJet Air and Bamboo Airways.

== Climate ==
Under the Köppen climate classification, Cần Thơ has a tropical wet and dry climate (Aw). Cần Thơ's climate features two seasons: rainy (from May to November) and dry (from December to April). Average annual humidity is 83%, rainfall 1,800 mm (71 in) and temperature 27 °C (81 °F).

Climate data for Cần Thơ
Month	Jan	Feb	Mar	Apr	May	Jun	Jul	Aug	Sep	Oct	Nov	Dec	Year
Record high °C (°F)	34.2 (93.6)	35.2 (95.4)	38.5 (101.3)	40.0 (104.0)	38.3 (100.9)	37.3 (99.1)	36.8 (98.2)	35.5 (95.9)	35.2 (95.4)	35.8 (96.4)	34.7 (94.5)	34.0 (93.2)	40.0 (104.0)
Mean daily maximum °C (°F)	30.2 (86.4)	31.2 (88.2)	32.7 (90.9)	33.9 (93.0)	33.2 (91.8)	32.0 (89.6)	31.4 (88.5)	31.2 (88.2)	31.1 (88.0)	31.0 (87.8)	30.7 (87.3)	29.7 (85.5)	31.5 (88.7)
Daily mean °C (°F)	25.4 (77.7)	26.1 (79.0)	27.3 (81.1)	28.5 (83.3)	28.0 (82.4)	27.3 (81.1)	26.9 (80.4)	26.8 (80.2)	26.8 (80.2)	26.9 (80.4)	26.9 (80.4)	25.7 (78.3)	26.9 (80.4)
Mean daily minimum °C (°F)	22.3 (72.1)	22.7 (72.9)	23.9 (75.0)	25.0 (77.0)	25.2 (77.4)	24.6 (76.3)	24.3 (75.7)	24.4 (75.9)	24.4 (75.9)	24.4 (75.9)	24.3 (75.7)	23.0 (73.4)	24.1 (75.4)
Record low °C (°F)	14.8 (58.6)	17.3 (63.1)	17.5 (63.5)	19.2 (66.6)	18.7 (65.7)	19.0 (66.2)	19.5 (67.1)	19.7 (67.5)	17.8 (64.0)	18.7 (65.7)	17.5 (63.5)	16.5 (61.7)	14.8 (58.6)
Average rainfall mm (inches)	10.0 (0.39)	3.8 (0.15)	15.4 (0.61)	41.8 (1.65)	223.0 (8.78)	309.7 (12.19)	336.0 (13.23)	337.9 (13.30)	451.4 (17.77)	300.9 (11.85)	137.1 (5.40)	41.5 (1.63)	2,218.5 (87.34)
Average rainy days	2.0	0.8	1.8	5.6	16.4	19.9	21.5	21.6	22.1	21.8	13.6	6.5	153.3
Average relative humidity (%)	80.9	79.4	77.9	78.2	83.7	86.0	86.2	87.0	87.1	86.2	84.3	82.1	83.4
Mean monthly sunshine hours	244.9	243.0	280.8	258.8	210.3	175.8	183.2	179.5	165.9	178.0	192.7	215.3	2,524.3
Source: Vietnam Institute for Building Science and Technology

== Twin towns – sister cities ==
- Kaposvár, Hungary
- Riverside, United States
- Shantou, China

== Gallery ==
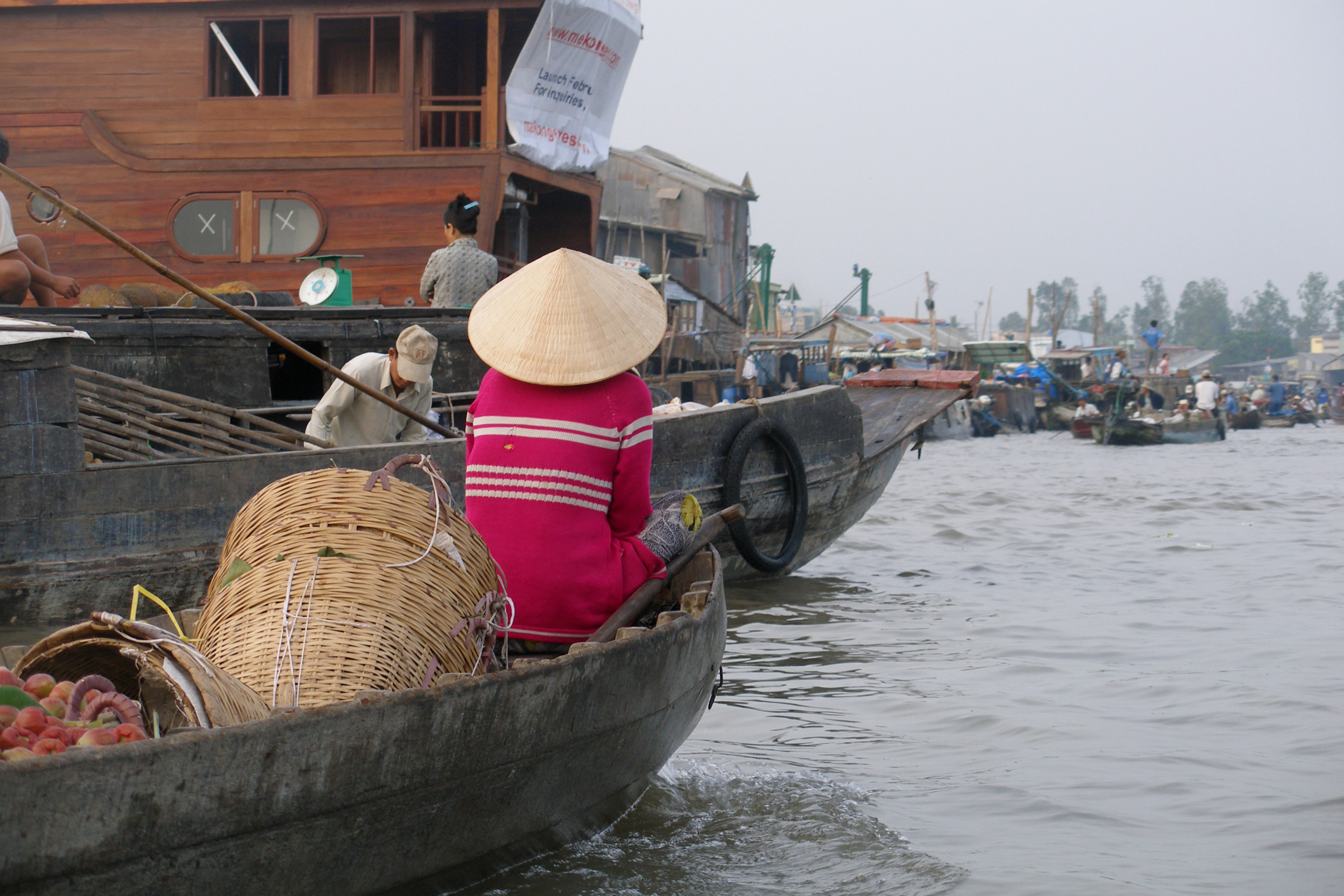

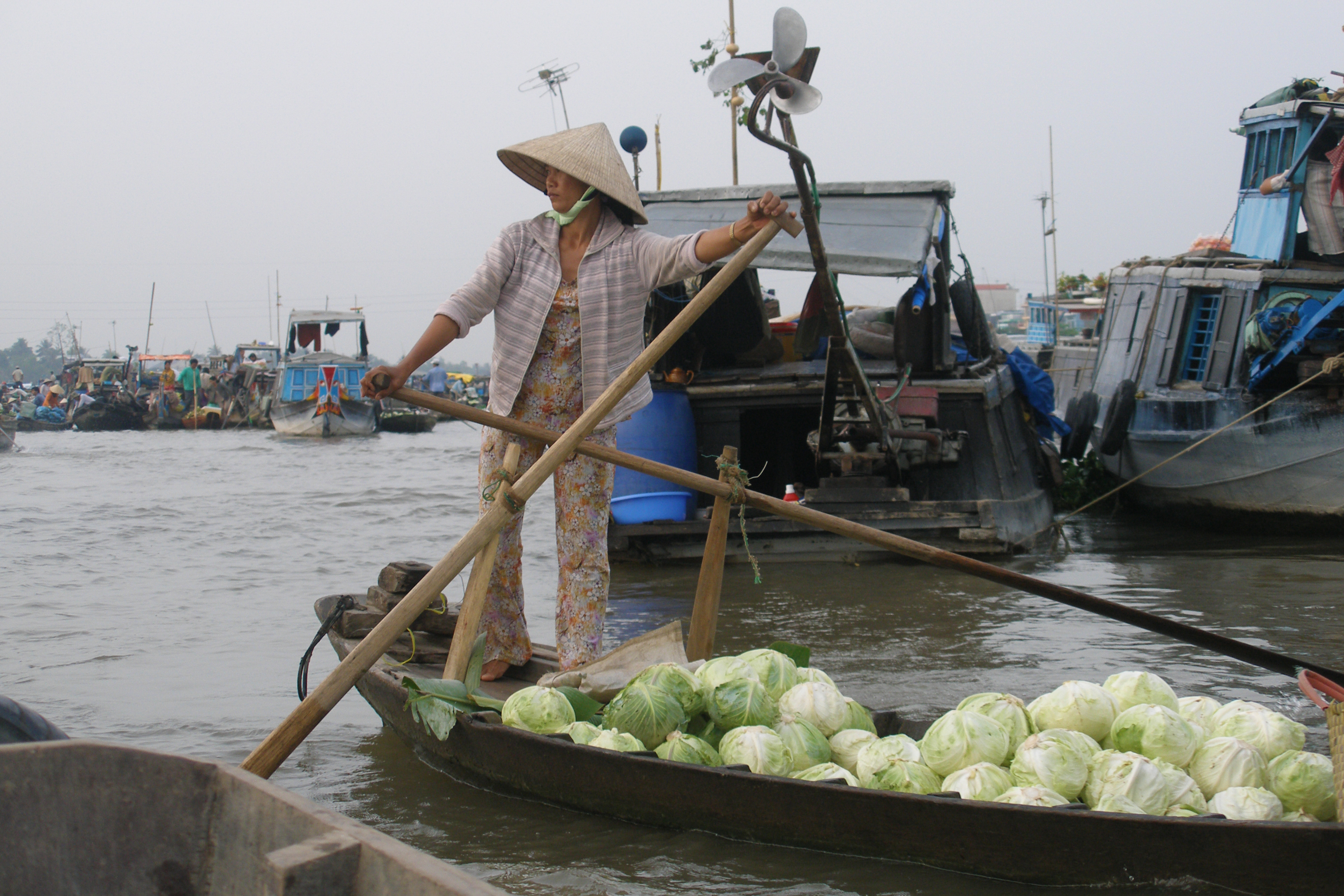

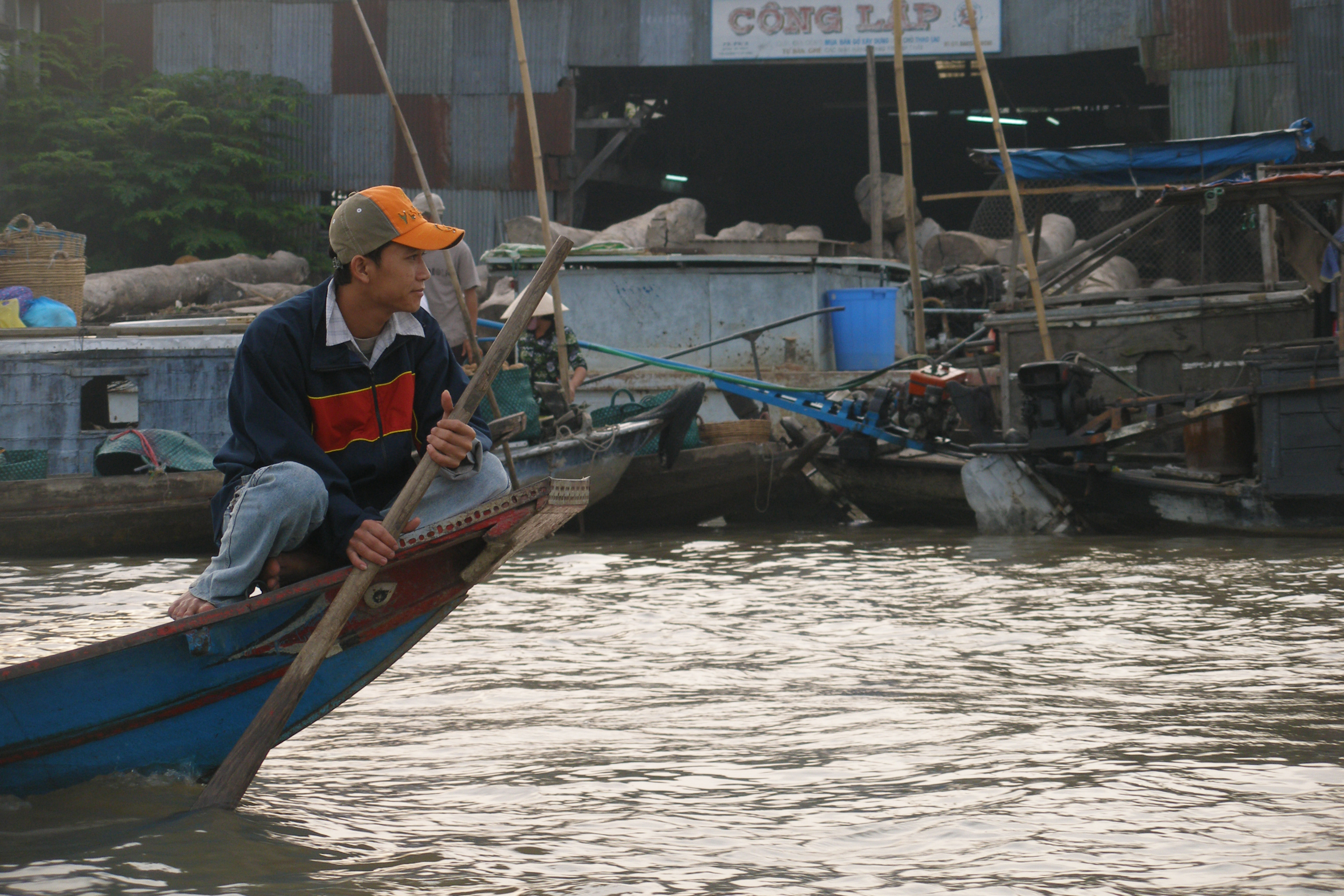

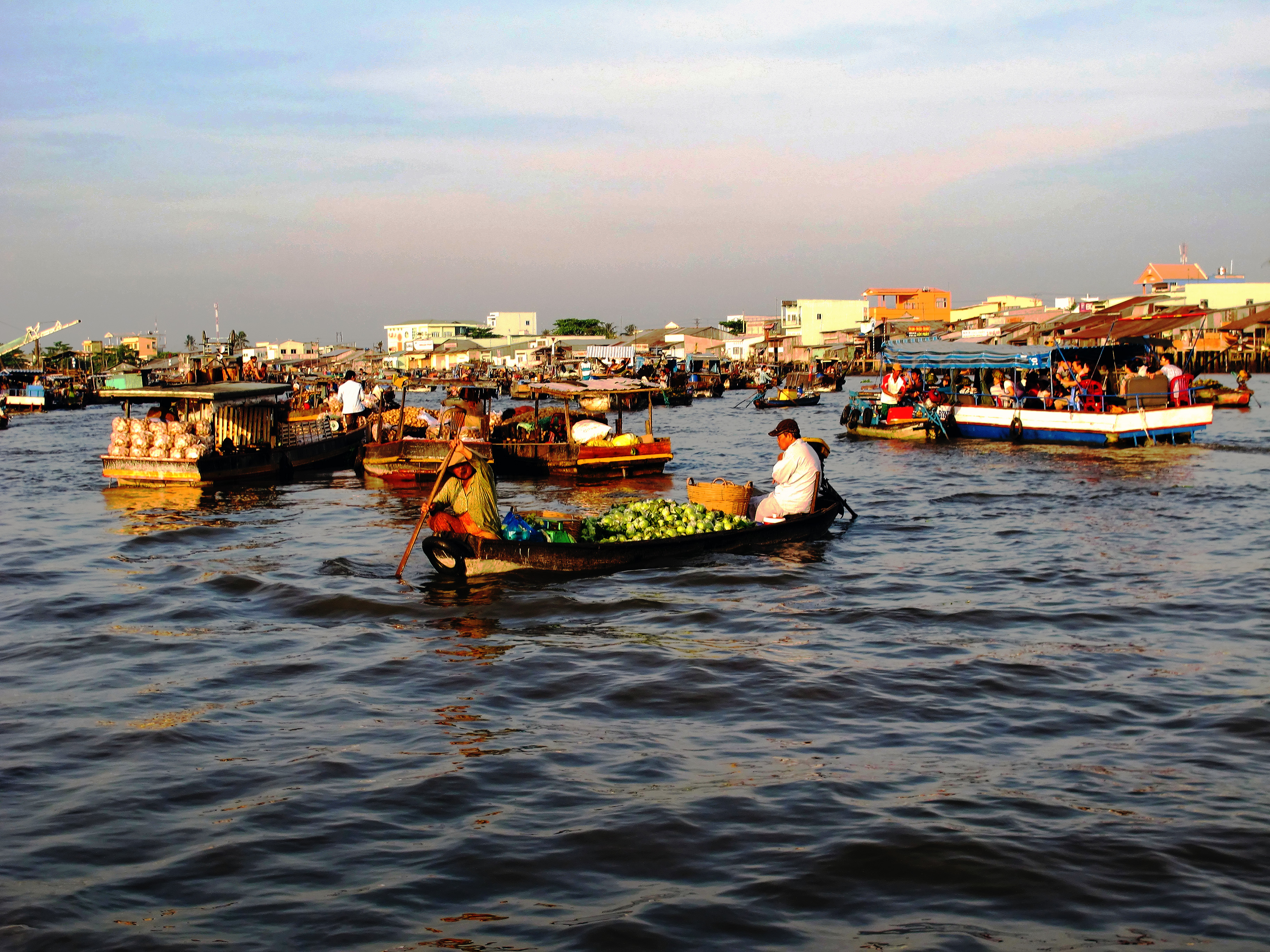

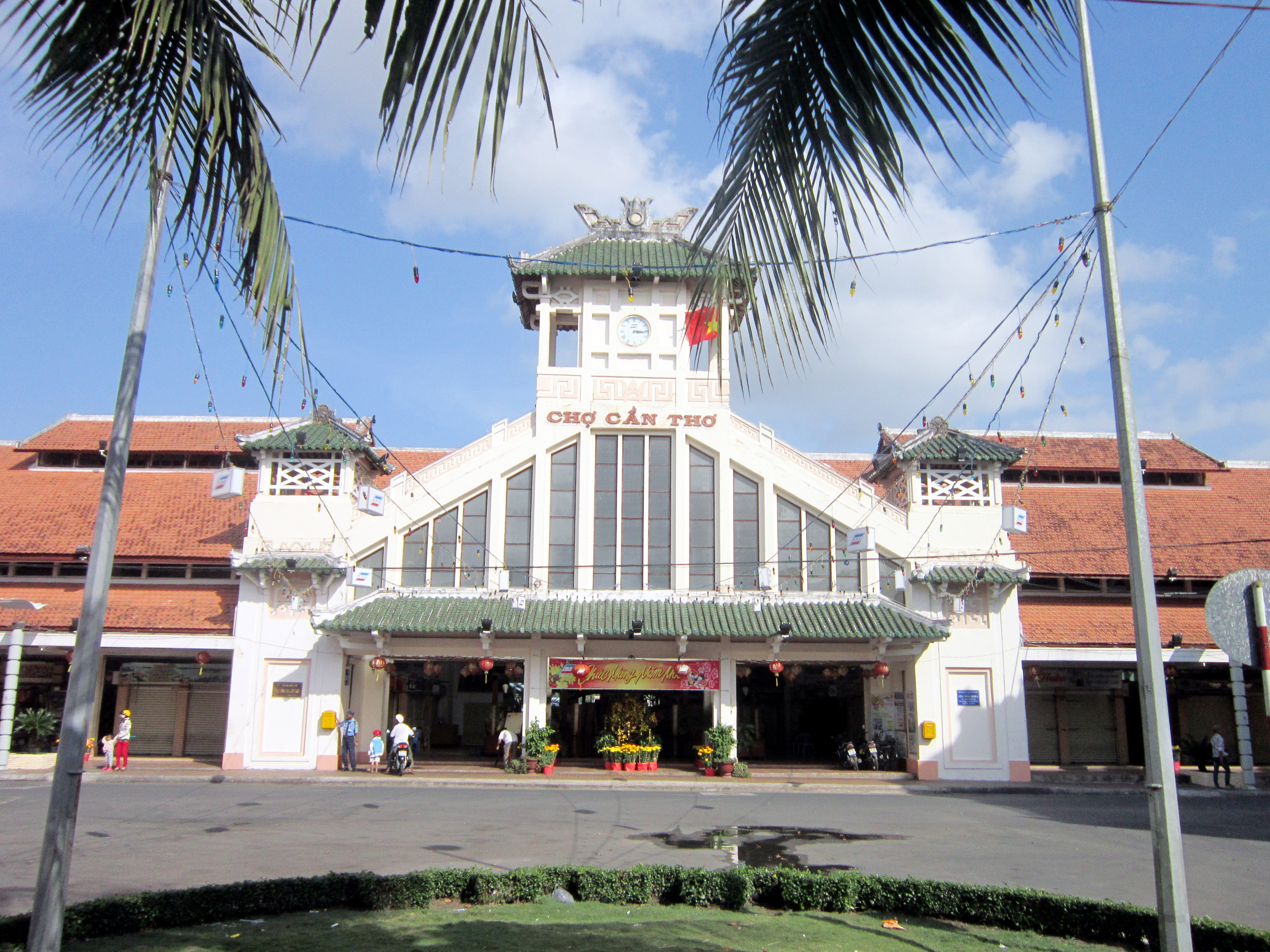
Cần Thơ market

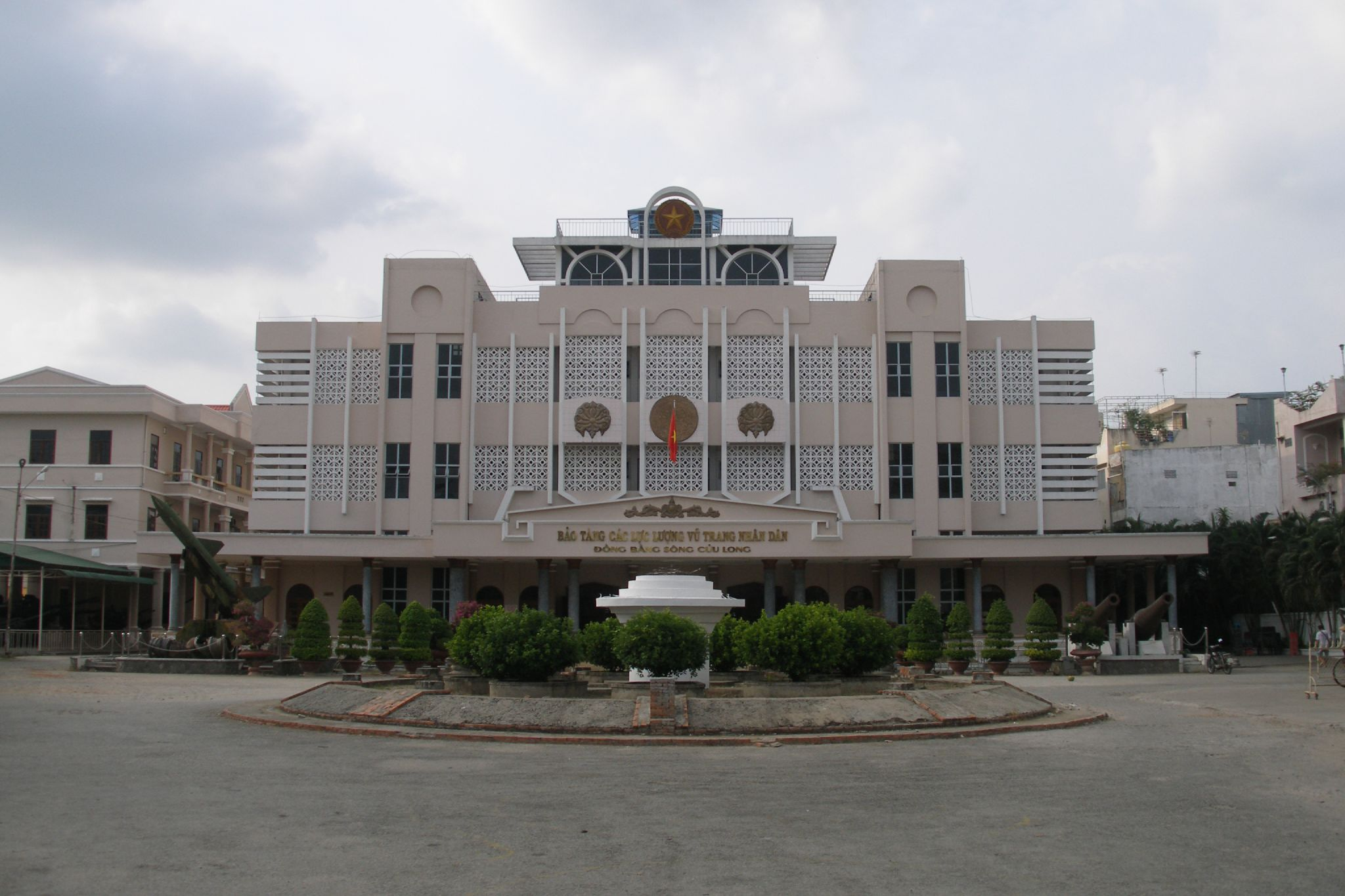
Museum of People's Armed Forces

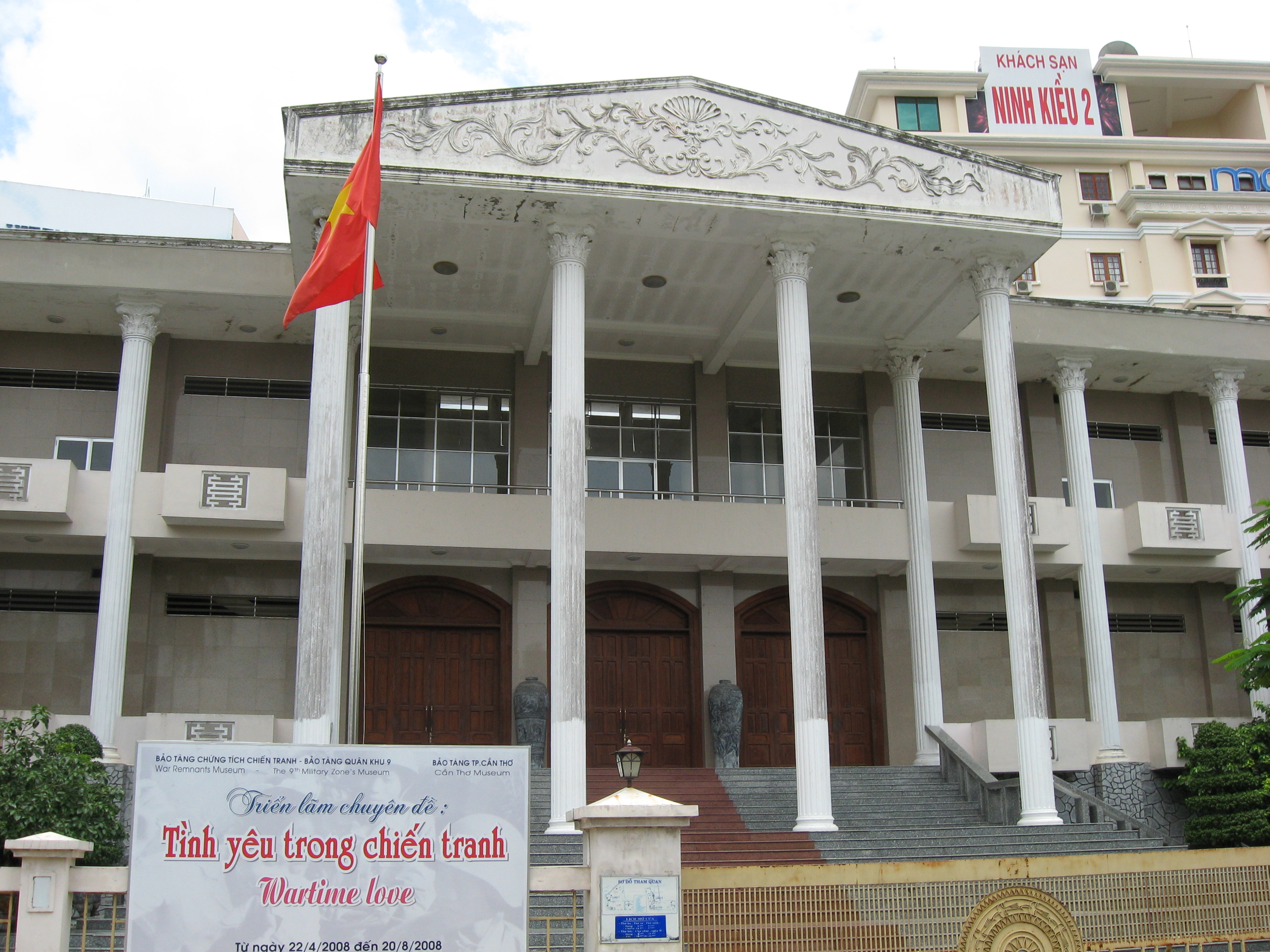
Cần Thơ Museum
