= An Bình, Cần Thơ =

Ward in Cần Thơ city, Vietnam

An Bình
- Ward
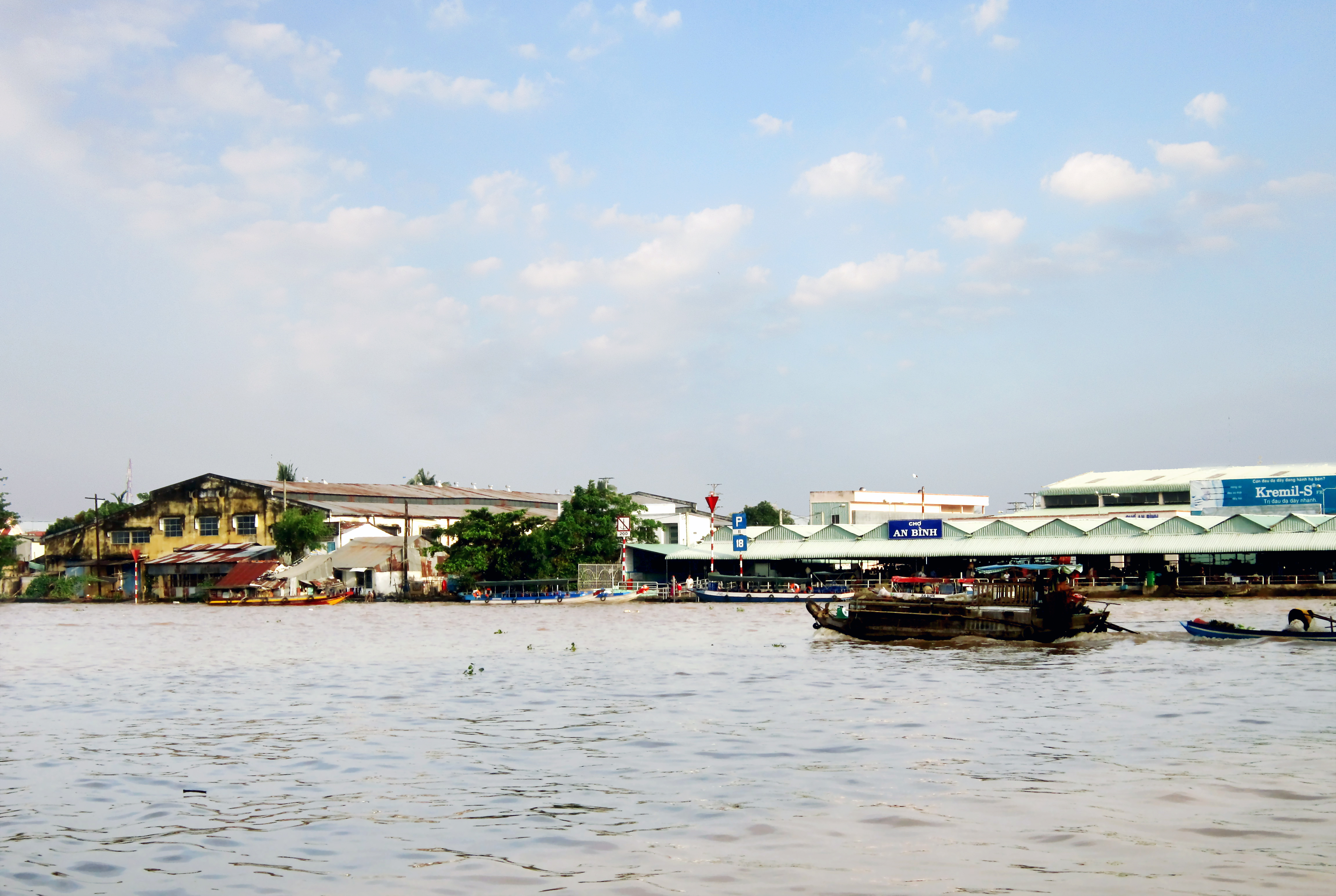
- An Bình market
- Interactive map of An Bình
- Country: Vietnam
- Region: Mekong Delta
- Centrally- governed city: Cần Thơ
- Established: June 16, 2025

Government
  - Type: Ward
  - Body: People's Council of An Bình ward

Area
  - Total: 18.39 km^{2} (7.10 sq mi)

Population (2025)
  - Total: 50,150
  - Density: 2,727/km^{2} (7,063/sq mi)
- Time zone: UTC+07:00

An Bình is a ward in Cần Thơ city, Vietnam. It is one of 103 wards and communes in the city.

== Geography ==
Location of An Bình ward on Cần Thơ city map.

An Bình is a ward in Cần Thơ city, located 40km northeast of Vị Thanh ward and 50km north of Sóc Trăng ward. It borders with Long Tuyền ward to the north, Tân An ward to the east, Cái Răng ward and Nhơn Ái commune to the south and Phong Điền commune to the west.

== Subdivisions ==
An Bình ward is divided into 11 neighborhoods: 1, 2, 3, 4, 5, 6, 7, Mỹ Hòa, Mỹ Khánh, Mỹ Long and Mỹ Phước.

== History ==
Prior to 2025, the area of An Bình ward was formerly An Bình ward (belonging to Ninh Kiều urban district), Mỹ Khánh commune (belonging to Phong Điền district) and a part of Long Tuyền ward (belonging to Bình Thủy urban district).

On June 12, 2025, the National Assembly of Vietnam issued Resolution No. 202/2025/QH15 on the reorganization of provincial-level administrative units. Hậu Giang and Sóc Trăng provinces were merged into Cần Thơ city.

On June 16, 2025, the Standing Committee of the National Assembly of Vietnam issued Resolution No. 1668/NQ-UBTVQH15 on the reorganization of commune-level administrative units in Cần Thơ city. An Bình ward was established by merging the entire area and population of An Bình ward (formerly part of Ninh Kiều urban district), Mỹ Khánh commune (formerly part of Phong Điền district) and a part of Long Tuyền ward (formerly part of Bình Thủy urban district).
