= Hưng Phú =

Hưng Phú may refer to several places in Vietnam, including:

- Hưng Phú: ward of Cần Thơ municipality.
- Hưng Phú: commune of Hưng Yên province.
- Hưng Phú: old ward in former district 8 of Hồ Chí Minh city (today part of Chánh Hưng ward, Hồ Chí Minh city).
- Hưng Phú: old ward in former Cái Răng district of Cần Thơ municipality (today part of Hưng Phú ward, Cần Thơ municipality)
- Hưng Phú: commune in Phước Long district, Bạc Liêu province (today part of Vĩnh Thanh commune, Cà Mau province).
- Hưng Phú: commune in Hưng Nguyên district, Nghệ An province (today part of Lam Thành commune, Nghệ An province).
- Hưng Phú: commune in Mỹ Tú district, Sóc Trăng province (today part of Long Hưng commune, Cần Thơ municipality).
