= Long Hòa =

Long Hòa may refer to several places in Vietnam, including:

- Long Hòa, Ho Chi Minh City, a commune in the former Dầu Tiếng district, Bình Dương province
- Long Hòa, Vĩnh Long, a commune in the former Châu Thành district, Trà Vinh province
- Long Hòa, An Giang, formerly a commune of Phú Tân district, now part of Phú Lâm, An Giang
- Long Hòa, Bến Tre, formerly a commune of Bình Đại district, now part of Châu Hưng, Vĩnh Long
- Long Hòa, Cần Thơ, formerly a ward of Bình Thủy district, now part of Long Tuyền
- Long Hòa, Ho Chi Minh City, formerly a commune of Cần Giờ district, now part of Cần Giờ, Ho Chi Minh City
- Long Hòa, Long An, formerly a commune of Cần Đước district, now part of Rạch Kiến
- Long Hòa, Tiền Giang, formerly a ward of Gò Công city, now part of Gò Công, Đồng Tháp

== See also ==
- Long Hoa, a ward of Tây Ninh province
