= Bình Thủy =

Ward in Cần Thơ city, Vietnam

- Ward
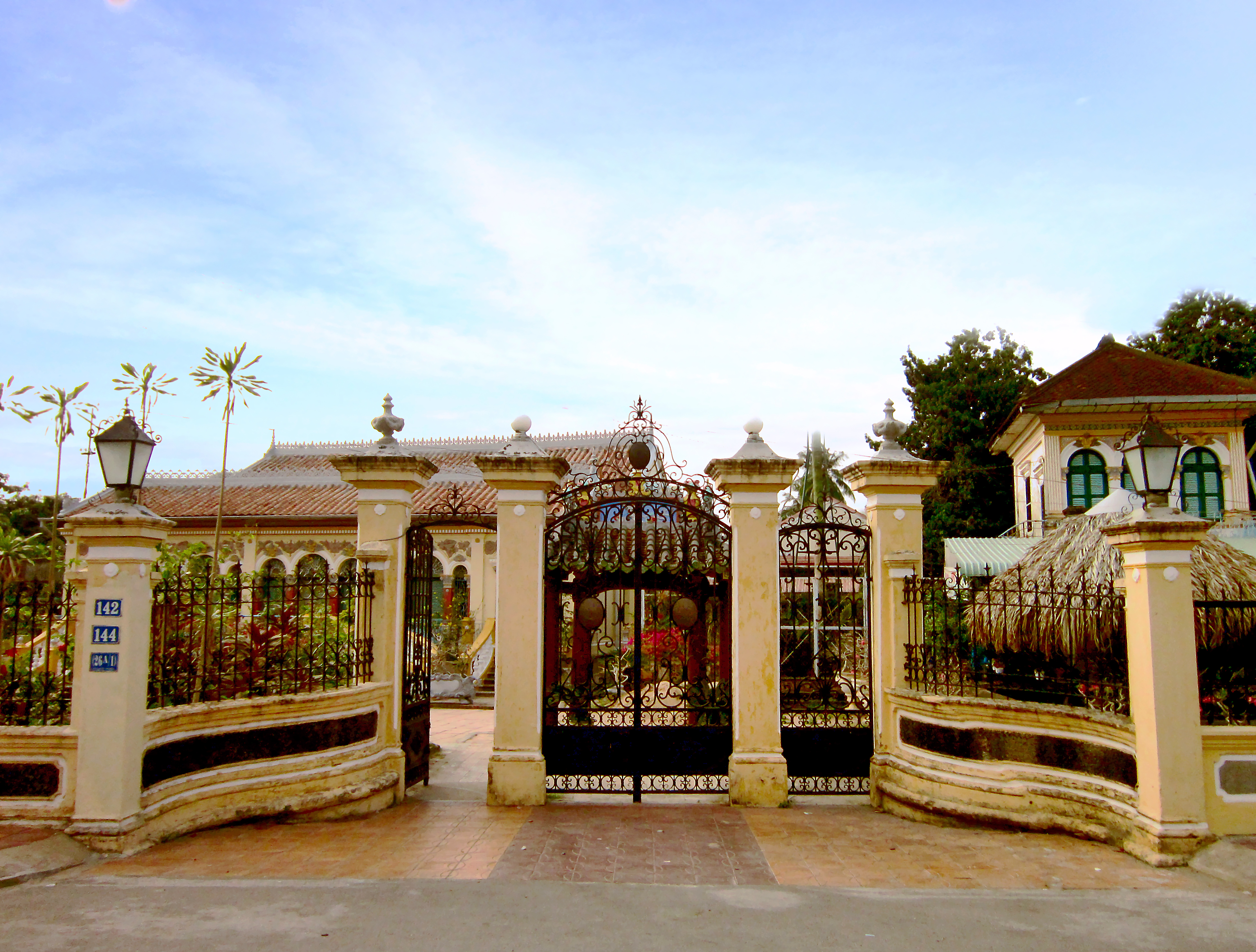
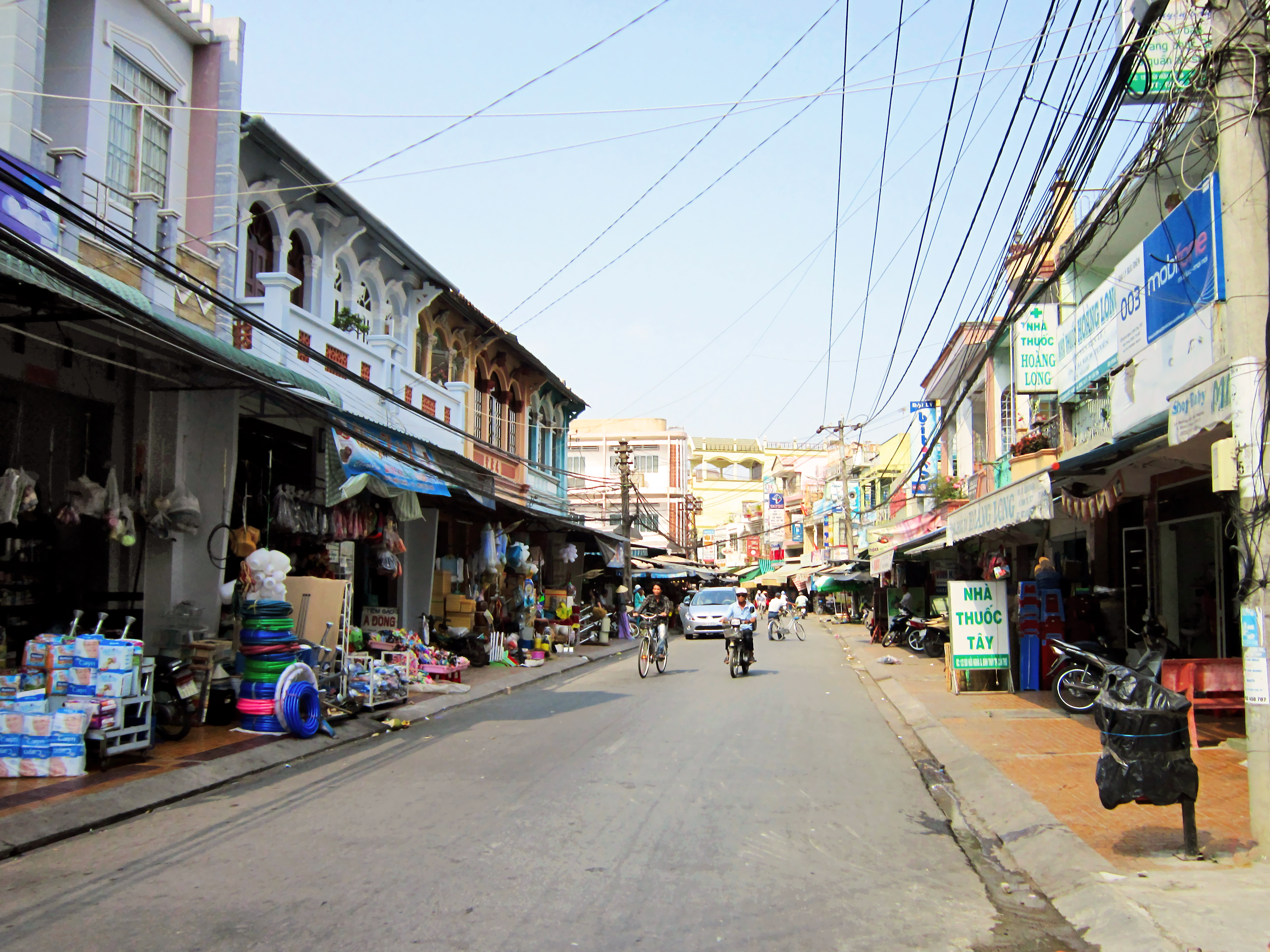
- Bình Thủy ancient house Bình Thủy market street
- Country: Vietnam
- Centrally- governed city: Cần Thơ
- Established: June 16, 2025

Government
  - Type: Ward

Area
  - Total: 15.17 km^{2} (5.86 sq mi)

Population (2025)
  - Total: 62,483 people
  - Density: 4,119/km^{2} (10,670/sq mi)
- Time zone: UTC+07:00
- Administrative code: 31168

Bình Thủy is a ward in Cần Thơ city, Vietnam. It is one of 103 communes and wards in the city following the 2025 reorganization.

== Geography ==
Location of Bình Thủy ward on Cần Thơ city map.

Bình Thủy ward has the following geographical location:

- To the east, it borders Cái Khế ward and Vĩnh Long province
- To the south, it borders Long Tuyền ward and Tân An ward
- To the west, it borders Thới An Đông ward.

== Subdivisions ==
Bình Thủy is divided into 17 neighborhoods, numbered from 1 to 17.

== History ==
Prior to 2025, Bình Thủy ward was formerly An Thới ward, Bình Thủy ward and a part of Bùi Hữu Nghĩa ward, belonging to Bình Thủy urban district, Cần Thơ city.

On June 12, 2025, the National Assembly of Vietnam issued Resolution No. 202/2025/QH15 on the reorganization of provincial-level administrative units. Cần Thơ city was established by merging the entire area and population of Cần Thơ city, Hậu Giang province and Sóc Trăng province.

On June 16, 2025, the Standing Committee of the National Assembly of Vietnam issued Resolution No. 1668/NQ-UBTVQH15 on the reorganization of commune-level administrative units in Cần Thơ city. Bình Thủy ward was established by merging the entire area and population of An Thới ward, Bình Thủy ward, and a part of Bùi Hữu Nghĩa ward (formerly part of Bình Thủy urban district).
