= Cái Khế =

Ward in Cần Thơ city, Vietnam

- Ward
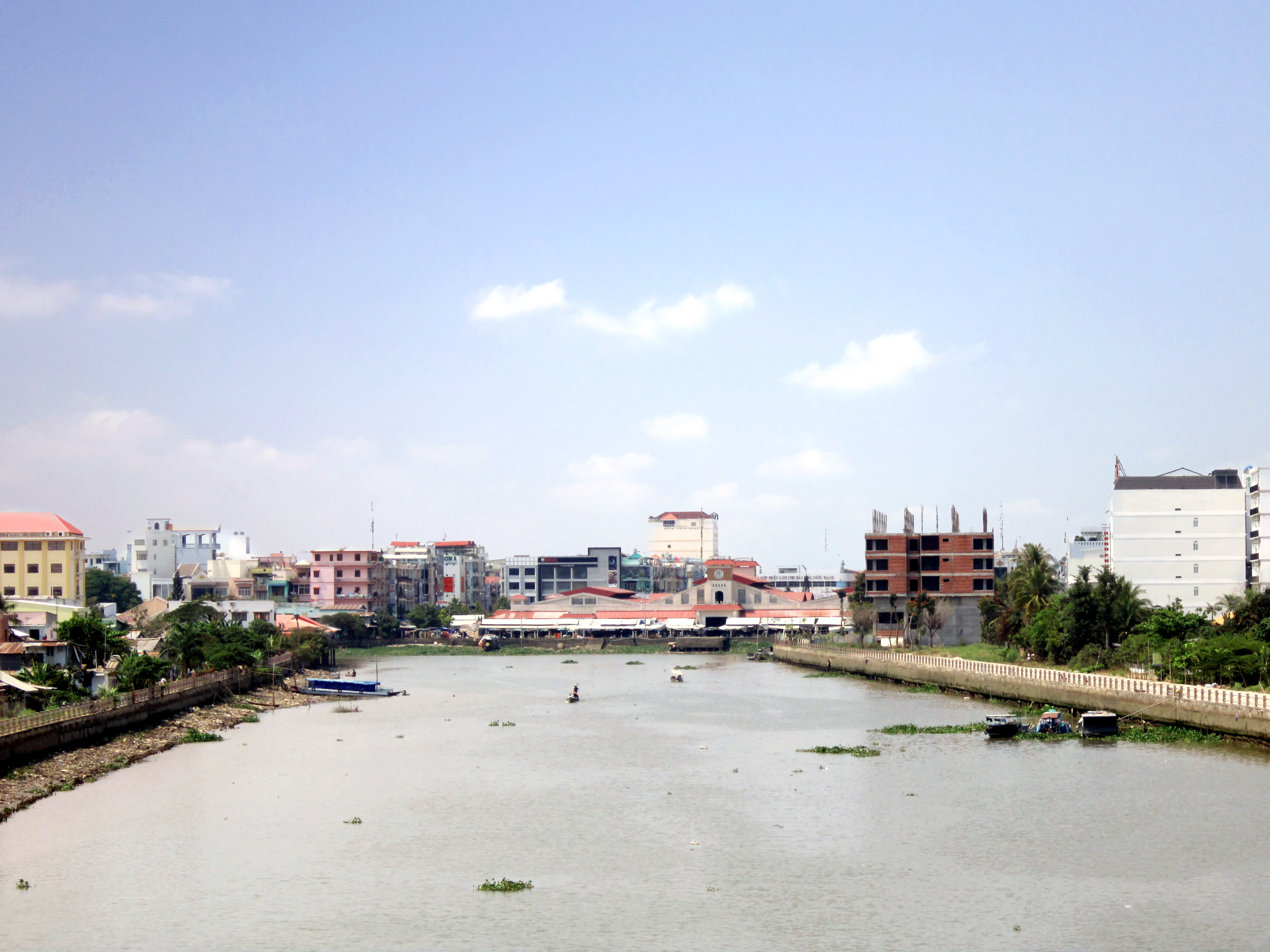
- Cái Khế shopping center
- Interactive map of Cái Khế
- Location within Vietnam
- Coordinates: 10°03′18″N 105°47′08″E
- Country: Vietnam
- Region: Mekong Delta
- Centrally- governed city: Cần Thơ
- Established: June 16, 2025

Government
  - Type: Ward

Area
  - Total: 3.88 sq mi (10.04 km^{2})

Population (2025)
  - Total: 57,688
- Time zone: UTC+7 (UTC + 7)

Cái Khế is a ward in Cần Thơ city, Vietnam. It is one of 103 wards and communes in the city following the 2025 reorganization.

== Geography ==
Location of Cái Khế ward on Cần Thơ administrative map.

Cái Khế is a ward in Cần Thơ city, located 45km northeast of Vị Thanh ward and 50km north of Sóc Trăng ward. It borders with Vĩnh Long province to the west; Ninh Kiều and Hưng Phú to the south; Tân An ward to the west and Bình Thủy ward to the north.

== Subdivisions ==
Cái Khế ward is divided into 13 neighborhoods: 1, 2, 3, 4, 5, 6, 7, 8, 9, 10, 11, 12 and Cồn Khương.

== History ==
On June 16, 2025, the Standing Committee of the National Assembly of Vietnam issued Resolution No. 1668/NQ-UBTVQH15 on the reorganization of commune-level administrative units in Cần Thơ city in 2025. Accordingly, Cái Khế ward was established on the basis of the entire natural area and population of An Hòa, Cái Khế ward (formerly part of Ninh Kiều urban district), and a part of Bùi Hữu Nghĩa ward (formerly part of Bình Thủy urban district).
