= List of province-level administrative divisions of Vietnam with Hán-Nôm characters =

This list contains the names of Vietnamese provinces and province-level municipalities in Quốc ngữ script and the (now obsolete) Hán-Nôm characters. For geographic and demographic data, please see Provinces of Vietnam.

== List of provinces ==
Provinces
Province (Quốc ngữ)	Province (Hán-Nôm)	Provincial capital (Quốc ngữ)	Provincial capital (Hán-Nôm)	Region (Quốc ngữ)	Region (Hán-Nôm)	Region (English)
tỉnh An Giang	省安江	thành phố Long Xuyên	城舖龍川	Đồng bằng sông Cửu Long	垌平瀧九龍	Mekong Delta
tỉnh Bà Rịa–Vũng Tàu	省婆地淎艚	thành phố Bà Rịa	城舖婆地	Đông Nam Bộ	東南部	Southeast
tỉnh Bình Dương	省平陽	thành phố Thủ Dầu Một	城舖守油沒	Đông Nam Bộ	東南部	Southeast
tỉnh Bình Phước	省平福	thị xã Đồng Xoài	市社同帥	Đông Nam Bộ	東南部	Southeast
tỉnh Bình Thuận	省平順	thành phố Phan Thiết	城舖潘切	Duyên hải Nam Trung Bộ	沿海南中部	South Central Coast
tỉnh Bình Định	省平定	thành phố Qui Nhơn	城舖歸仁	Duyên hải Nam Trung Bộ	沿海南中部	South Central Coast
tỉnh Bạc Liêu	省北遼	thành phố Bạc Liêu	城舖北遼	Đồng bằng sông Cửu Long	垌平瀧九龍	Mekong Delta
tỉnh Bắc Giang	省北江	thành phố Bắc Giang	城舖北江	Đông Bắc Bộ	東北部	Northeast
tỉnh Bắc Kạn	省北𣴓	thành phố Bắc Kạn	城舖北𣴓	Đông Bắc Bộ	東北部	Northeast
tỉnh Bắc Ninh	省北寧	thành phố Bắc Ninh	城舖北寧	Đồng bằng sông Hồng	垌平瀧紅	Red River Delta
tỉnh Bến Tre	省𤅶𥯌	thành phố Bến Tre	城舖𤅶𥯌	Đồng bằng sông Cửu Long	垌平瀧九龍	Mekong Delta
tỉnh Cao Bằng	省高平	thành phố Cao Bằng	城舖高平	Đông Bắc Bộ	東北部	Northeast
tỉnh Cà Mau	省哥毛	thành phố Cà Mau	城舖哥毛	Đồng bằng sông Cửu Long	垌平瀧九龍	Mekong Delta
tỉnh Gia Lai	省嘉萊	thành phố Pleiku	城舖坡離俱	Tây Nguyên	西原	Central Highlands
tỉnh Hà Giang	省河江	thành phố Hà Giang	城舖河江	Đông Bắc Bộ	東北部	Northeast
tỉnh Hà Nam	省河南	thành phố Phủ Lý	城舖府里	Đồng bằng sông Hồng	垌平瀧紅	Red River Delta
tỉnh Hà Tĩnh	省河靜	thành phố Hà Tĩnh	城舖河靜	Bắc Trung Bộ	北中部	North Central Coast
tỉnh Hòa Bình	省和平	thành phố Hòa Bình	城舖和平	Tây Bắc Bộ	西北部	Northwest
tỉnh Hưng Yên	省興安	thành phố Hưng Yên	城舖興安	Đồng bằng sông Hồng	垌平瀧紅	Red River Delta
tỉnh Hải Dương	省海陽	thành phố Hải Dương	城舖海陽	Đồng bằng sông Hồng	垌平瀧紅	Red River Delta
tỉnh Hậu Giang	省後江	thành phố Vị Thanh	城舖渭清	Đồng bằng sông Cửu Long	垌平瀧九龍	Mekong Delta
tỉnh Khánh Hòa	省慶和	thành phố Nha Trang	城舖芽莊	Duyên hải Nam Trung Bộ	沿海南中部	South Central Coast
tỉnh Kiên Giang	省堅江	thành phố Rạch Giá	城舖瀝架	Đồng bằng sông Cửu Long	垌平瀧九龍	Mekong Delta
tỉnh Kon Tum	省崑嵩	thành phố Kon Tum	城舖崑嵩	Tây Nguyên	西原	Central Highlands
tỉnh Lai Châu	省萊州	thành phố Lai Châu	城舖萊州	Tây Bắc Bộ	西北部	Northwest
tỉnh Long An	省隆安	thành phố Tân An	城舖新安	Đồng bằng sông Cửu Long	垌平瀧九龍	Mekong Delta
tỉnh Lào Cai	省老街	thành phố Lào Cai	城舖老街	Đông Bắc Bộ	東北部	Northeast
tỉnh Lâm Đồng	省林同	thành phố Đà Lạt	城舖多樂	Tây Nguyên	西原	Central Highlands
tỉnh Lạng Sơn	省諒山	thành phố Lạng Sơn	城舖諒山	Đông Bắc Bộ	東北部	Northeast
tỉnh Nam Định	省南定	thành phố Nam Định	城舖南定	Đồng bằng sông Hồng	垌平瀧紅	Red River Delta
tỉnh Nghệ An	省乂安	thành phố Vinh	城舖榮?	Bắc Trung Bộ	北中部	North Central Coast
tỉnh Ninh Bình	省寧平	thành phố Ninh Bình	城舖寧平	Đồng bằng sông Hồng	垌平瀧紅	Red River Delta
tỉnh Ninh Thuận	省寧順	thành phố Phan Rang–Tháp Chàm	城舖潘郎塔占	Duyên hải Nam Trung Bộ	沿海南中部	South Central Coast
tỉnh Phú Thọ	省富壽	thành phố Việt Trì	城舖越池	Đông Bắc Bộ	東北部	Northeast
tỉnh Phú Yên	省富安	thành phố Tuy Hòa	城舖綏和	Duyên hải Nam Trung Bộ	沿海南中部	South Central Coast
tỉnh Quảng Bình	省廣平	thành phố Đồng Hới	城舖洞海	Bắc Trung Bộ	北中部	North Central Coast
tỉnh Quảng Nam	省廣南	thành phố Tam Kỳ	城舖三岐	Duyên hải Nam Trung Bộ	沿海南中部	South Central Coast
tỉnh Quảng Ngãi	省廣義	thành phố Quảng Ngãi	城舖省廣義	Duyên hải Nam Trung Bộ	沿海南中部	South Central Coast
tỉnh Quảng Ninh	省廣寧	thành phố Hạ Long	城舖下龍	Đông Bắc Bộ	東北部	Northeast
tỉnh Quảng Trị	省廣治	thành phố Đông Hà	城舖東河	Bắc Trung Bộ	北中部	North Central Coast
tỉnh Sóc Trăng	省朔庄	thành phố Sóc Trăng	城舖朔莊	Đồng bằng sông Cửu Long	垌平瀧九龍	Mekong Delta
tỉnh Sơn La	省山羅	thành phố Sơn La	城舖山羅	Tây Bắc Bộ	西北部	Northwest
tỉnh Thanh Hóa	省清化	thành phố Thanh Hóa	城舖清化	Bắc Trung Bộ	北中部	North Central Coast
tỉnh Thái Bình	省太平	thành phố Thái Bình	城舖太平	Đồng bằng Sông Hồng	垌平瀧紅	Red River Delta
tỉnh Thái Nguyên	省太原	thành phố Thái Nguyên	城舖太原	Đông Bắc Bộ	東北部	Northeast
tỉnh Thừa Thiên–Huế	省承天-化	thành phố Huế	城舖化	Bắc Trung Bộ	北中部	North Central Coast
tỉnh Tiền Giang	省前江	thành phố Mỹ Tho	城舖美萩	Đồng bằng sông Cửu Long	垌平瀧九龍	Mekong Delta
tỉnh Trà Vinh	省茶榮	thành phố Trà Vinh	城舖茶榮	Đồng bằng sông Cửu Long	垌平瀧九龍	Mekong Delta
tỉnh Tuyên Quang	省宣光	thành phố Tuyên Quang	城舖宣光	Đông Bắc Bộ	東北部	Northeast
tỉnh Tây Ninh	省西寧	thành phố Tây Ninh	城舖西寧	Đông Nam Bộ	東南部	Southeast
tỉnh Vĩnh Long	省永隆	thành phố Vĩnh Long	城舖永隆	Đồng bằng sông Cửu Long	垌平瀧九龍	Mekong Delta
tỉnh Vĩnh Phúc	省永福	thành phố Vĩnh Yên	城舖永安	Đồng bằng sông Hồng	垌平瀧紅	Red River Delta
tỉnh Yên Bái	省安沛	thành phố Yên Bái	城舖安沛	Đông Bắc Bộ	東北部	Northeast
tỉnh Điện Biên	省奠邊	thành phố Điện Biên Phủ	城舖奠邊府	Tây Bắc Bộ	西北部	Northwest
tỉnh Đắk Lắk	省得勒	thành phố Buôn Ma Thuột	城舖班迷屬	Tây Nguyên	西原	Central Highlands
tỉnh Đắk Nông	省多農	thị xã Gia Nghĩa	市社嘉義	Tây Nguyên	西原	Central Highlands
tỉnh Đồng Nai	省同狔	thành phố Biên Hòa	城舖邊和	Đông Nam Bộ	東南部	Southeast
tỉnh Đồng Tháp	省墥塔	thành phố Cao Lãnh	城舖高嶺?	Đồng bằng sông Cửu Long	垌平瀧九龍	Mekong Delta

== List of province-level municipalities ==
Province-level municipalities (cities)
City (Quốc ngữ)	City (Hán-Nôm)	Central district (Quốc ngữ)	Central district (Hán-Nôm)	Region (Quốc ngữ)	Region (Hán-Nôm)	Region (English)
thành phố Cần Thơ	城舖芹苴	Quận Ninh Kiều	郡寧橋	Đồng bằng sông Cửu Long	垌平瀧九龍	Mekong Delta
thành phố Đà Nẵng	城舖沱㶞	Quận Hải Châu	郡海洲	Duyên hải Nam Trung Bộ	沿海南中部	South Central Coast
thành phố Hà Nội	城舖河內	Quận Hoàn Kiếm	郡還劍	Đồng bằng sông Hồng	垌平瀧紅	Red River Delta
thành phố Hải Phòng	城舖海防	Quận Hồng Bàng	郡鴻龐	Đồng bằng sông Hồng	垌平瀧紅	Red River Delta
thành phố Hồ Chí Minh	城舖胡志明	Quận 1 (một/nhất)	郡𠬠/郡一	Đông Nam Bộ	東南部	Southeast

== See also ==
- Provinces of Vietnam
- History of writing in Vietnam
- Chữ Nôm
