= Huỳnh Tấn Hùng =

Vietnamese footballer (born 1992)

Personal information
- Full name: Huỳnh Tấn Hùng
- Date of birth: 17 June 1992 (age 34)
- Place of birth: Phong Điền, Cần Thơ, Vietnam
- Height: 1.74 m (5 ft 9 in)
- Position: Midfielder

Youth career
- 2005–2014: Cần Thơ

Senior career*
Years	Team	Apps	(Gls)
2015–2023	Cần Thơ	76	(4)

International career
2016–2017	Vietnam	1	(0)
- * Club domestic league appearances and goals as of 19 May 2018

Huỳnh Tấn Hùng (born 17 June 1992) is a Vietnamese footballer who plays as a midfielders for XSKT Cần Thơ. On 4 July 2015 Huỳnh scored in a 4-3 shock win over Đồng Nai in what was only Cần Thơ's second win of the 2015 season.
