= Cái Răng Floating Market =

Floating market in Vietnam

Coordinates: 10.005°N 105.746°E

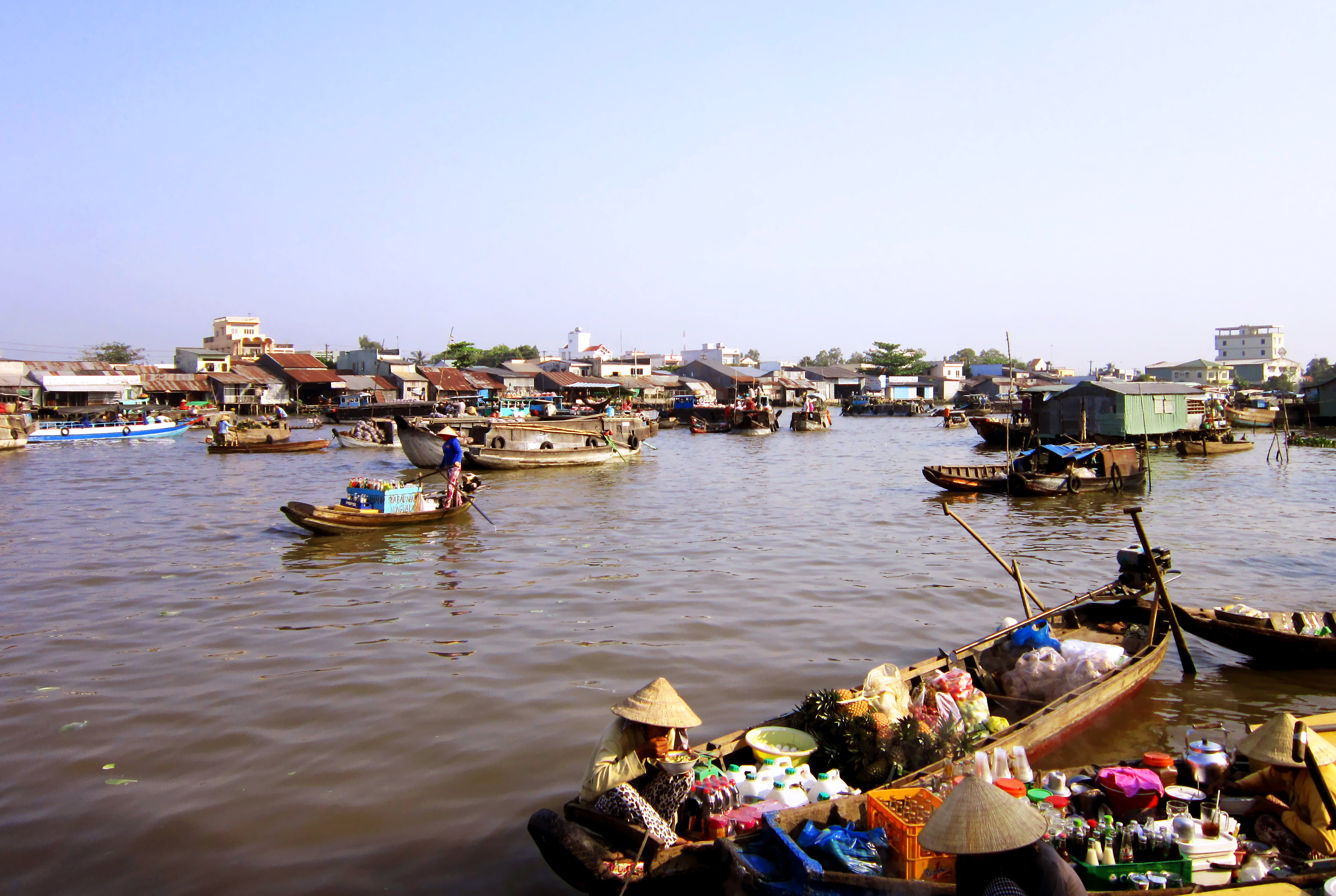
A scene at Cái Răng Floating Market

Cái Răng Floating Market (Vietnamese: Chợ nổi Cái Răng) is a wholesale floating market specializing in the trade of vegetables and fruits on the Cần Thơ River, a distributary of Hậu River, and is a unique tourist attraction in the districts of Cái Răng and Ninh Kiều (Cần Thơ River is the borderline of both districts) in Cần Thơ, Vietnam. With a history dating back to the early 20th century, the market emerged as a crucial trading hub. Before the development of roads and bridges, the myriad waterways of the delta region were the primary means of trade and transport, leading to the development of floating markets where channels converged.

In 2016, Cái Răng Floating Market was recognized as a national intangible cultural heritage by the Ministry of Culture, Sports, and Tourism of Vietnam.

== Location ==
The market is located on the Cần Thơ River, near Cái Răng Bridge, about 7 kilometers from the center of Cần Thơ.

Visitors can reach the floating market in two ways: either by renting a boat at Ninh Kiều Quay or by taking a car to An Bình Market (in An Bình, Ninh Kiều district) and then renting a boat. The boat fare is 100,000 - 140,000 VND per person.

== Background ==
The uniqueness and main feature of Cái Răng Floating Market is the sale of vegetables and fruits from the Mekong Delta. In the past, the floating market developed because the waterways played a near-exclusive role in transportation. As trade demand increased, people would gather at river junctions, making them ideal spots for trading. Today, although the road network has expanded significantly, leading to the disappearance of many floating markets, tourism activities have allowed Cái Răng Floating Market to evolve into a more sustainable form.

== Characteristics ==
Cái Răng Floating Market is also a wholesale market specializing in vegetables and fruits. The market opens at around 2–3 AM, with peak activity from 4–6 AM, though buying and selling continues throughout the day. As a wholesale market, goods are brought here in relatively large quantities. Each type of product is sorted by quality and size. Boats, primarily "ghe bầu" (large, flat-bottomed boats), are the main means of transport and loading.

Visitors can immerse themselves in the bustling market atmosphere and observe the lives of merchant families, with multiple generations living on boats. Each boat is like a floating house, equipped with potted plants, pets, and modern amenities like color TVs, DVD players, and even motorbikes parked on the boats.

At the market, goods are advertised by a method known as "bẹo hàng", which refers to hanging a sample of the goods (such as fruits or vegetables) on a long pole instead of using signs. The "selling boat" typically hangs any plant pot to distinguish it from the "buying boat." The "bẹo" is a long pole (often made of bamboo), tied with any item for marking or signaling something. It has been a long-standing practice in the daily lives of people in the Southwest region of Vietnam.

== Operating hours ==
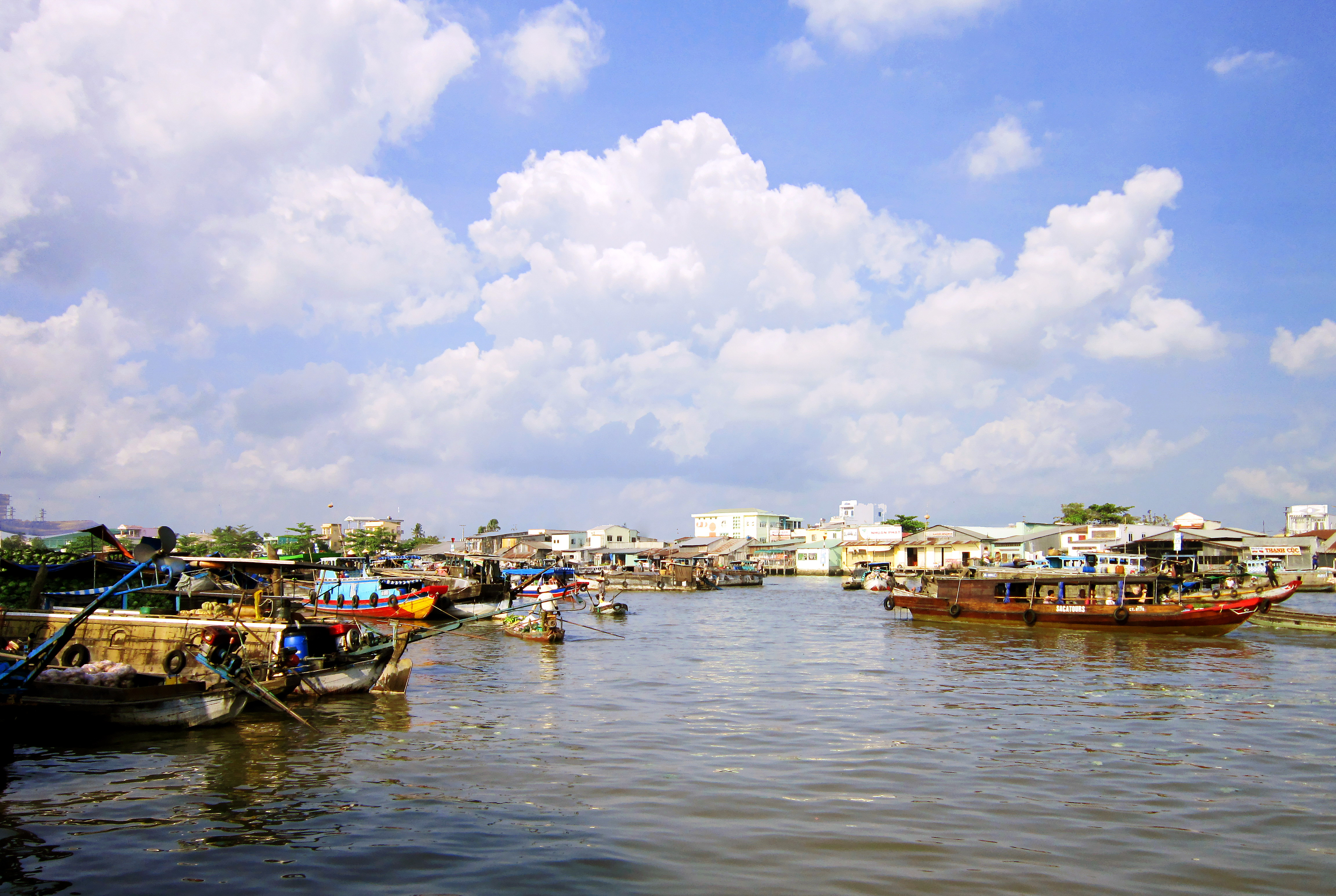
Another scene at Cái Răng Floating Market

The Cái Răng Floating Market usually starts early, around 2–3 AM. The best time for visitors is between 5–6 AM. The market is closed or operates on a limited basis during the Lunar New Year (1st and 2nd days of Tet) and Doan Ngo Festival (5th day of the 5th lunar month). Due to market-goers' needs, not only are there boats selling vegetables and fruits, but also many other services such as food and shopping. Fruit-selling boats often weave through the crowd to serve tourists.

== Tourism ==
Cái Răng Floating Market is one of the most prominent tourist attractions in Can Tho. It is considered a cultural symbol of the waterway region, attracting many visitors, especially foreign tourists. Almost all tours to Can Tho City include a visit to the floating market.

A popular activity is taking an early morning boat trip to observe the trading scene, where vendors sell fresh fruits, vegetables, and local products directly from their boats. Tourists can also enjoy traditional Vietnamese breakfast dishes such as hủ tiếu, bún riêu, or Vietnamese coffee served on floating boats.

== In literature and art ==
=== In poetry ===
Chợ đã nổi từ nửa đêm về sáng
Ta vẫn chìm từ giữa bữa hoàng hôn
Em treo bẹo Cái Răng Ba Láng
Ta thương hồ Vàm Xáng Cần Thơ
- Huỳnh Kim -

==== English translation ====
The market has floated since midnight
While I remain adrift since sunset.
You hang your 'bẹo' in Cai Rang, Ba Lang
And I'm a merchant in Vam Xang, Can Tho.
- Huỳnh Kim -

=== In music ===
- "Sông Nước Cần Thơ" – Composed by La Tuan Dung
- "Cần Thơ Yêu Dấu" – Music by La Tuan Dung
- "Phiên Chợ Sông" – Composed by Hoai An

== Gallery ==
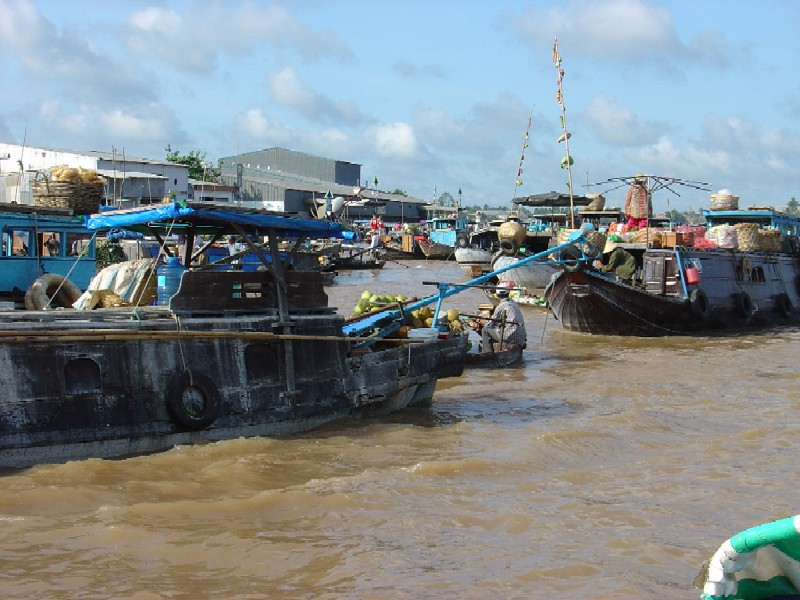
Cái Răng Floating Market scene

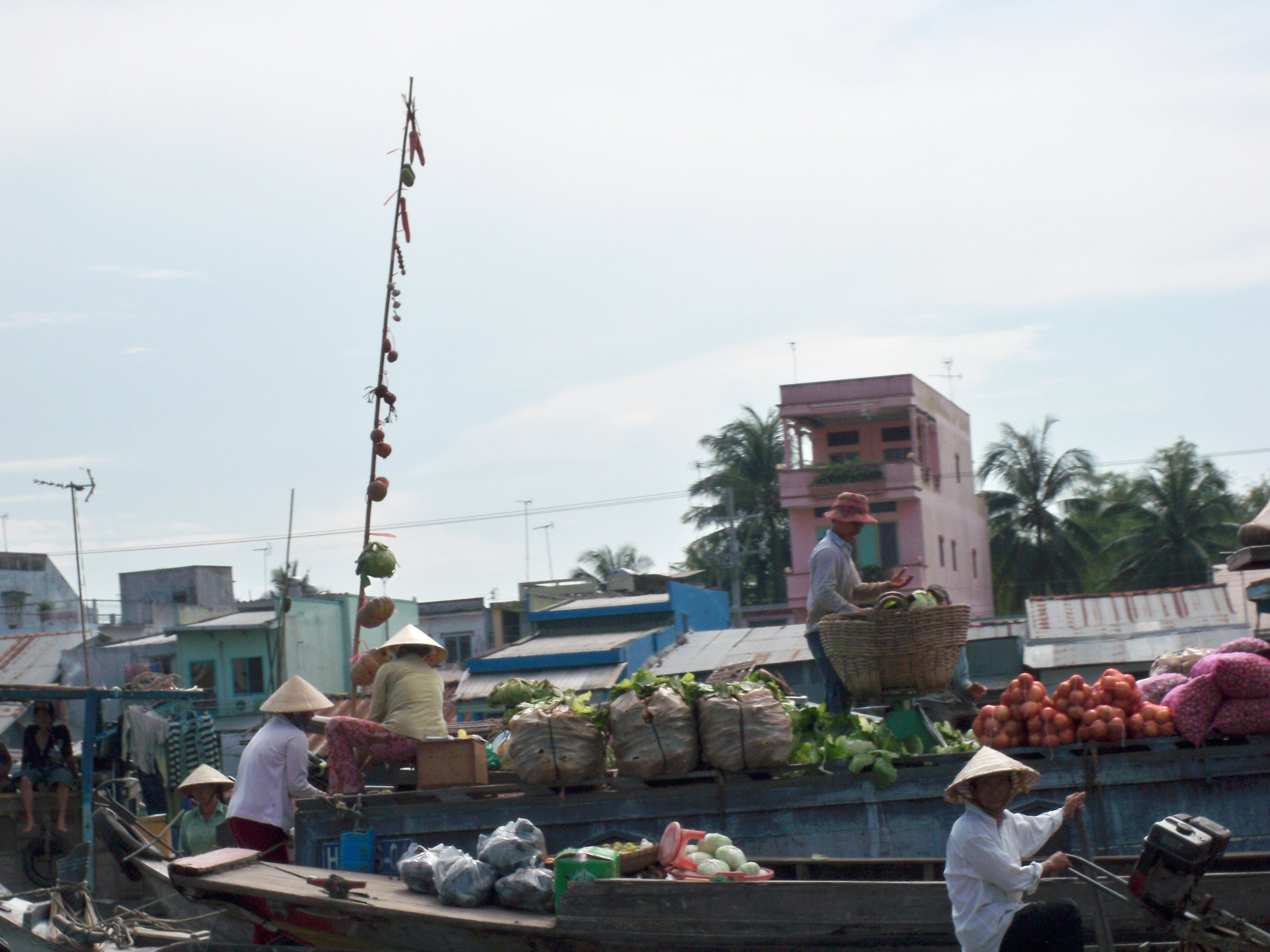
This is a "bẹo" pole – by looking at the pole, you can know what the boat is selling: pumpkins, onions, cassava, etc.

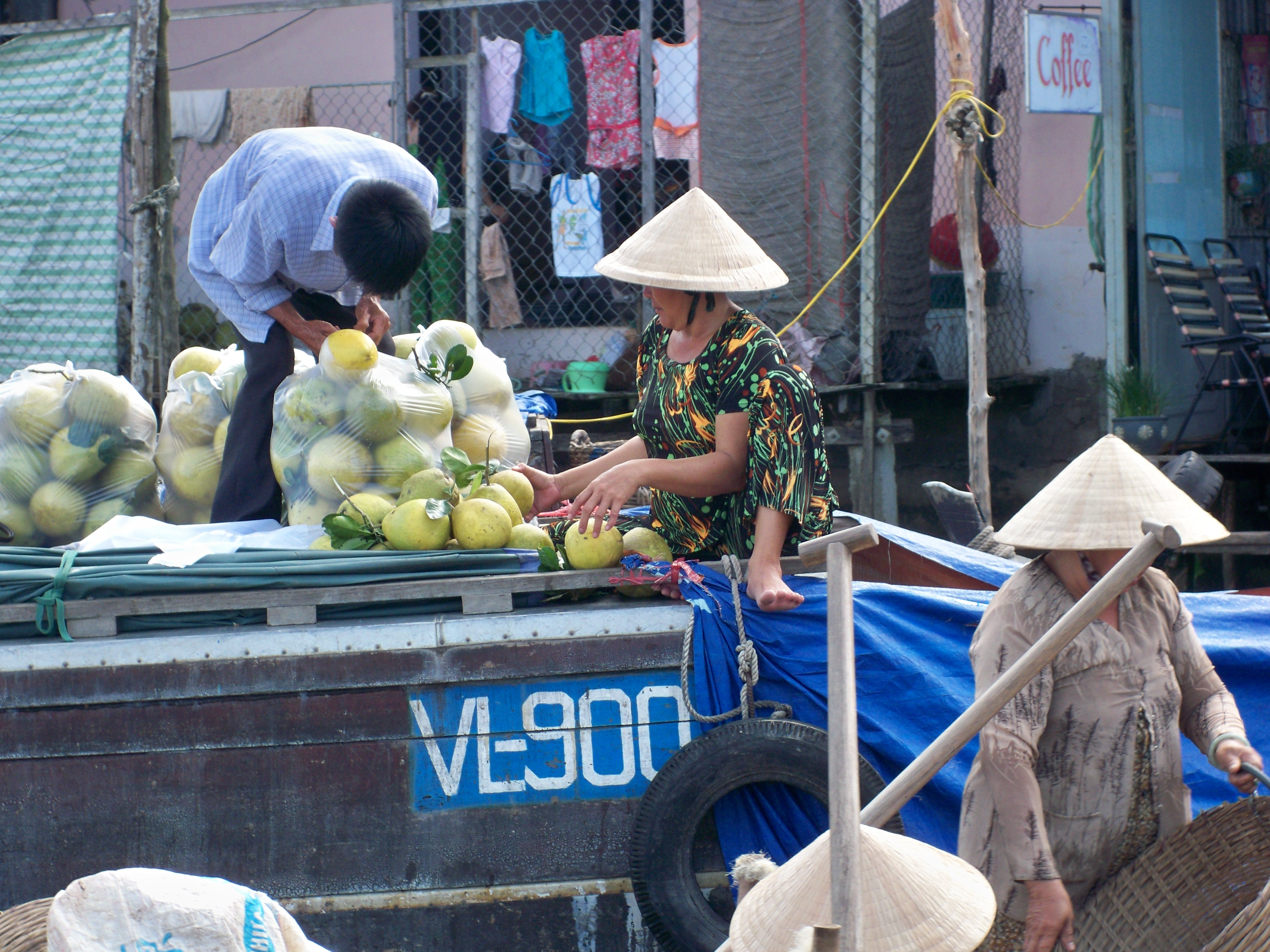
Traders selling fresh pomelos from a boat at Cái Răng Floating Market
