= Phan Van Tri High School =

Phan Van Tri high school
- Trường Trung học phổ thông Phan Văn Trị

Location
- Thị Tứ Hamlet, Phong Điền town, Phong Điền district, Cần Thơ city Vietnam

Information
- Type: Public
- Established: 1968
- Principal: Nguyễn Hoàng Minh
- Grades: 10-12
- Enrollment: 1,230

Phan Van Tri High School (Vietnamese: Trường Trung học phổ thông Phan Văn Trị) is a public high school in Phong Điền district, Can Tho, Vietnam.

Started in 1968, the school was named after Phan Van Tri, a noted 19th century Vietnamese poet.

== History ==
Phan Van Tri High School was founded in 1968 as Phong Dien Secondary School. It had two 6th grade classrooms with 90 pupils. In 1974, it was renamed Phan Van Tri Secondary School. Since 1976, the school has been renamed Nhon Ai 2 Secondary School. It only served primary and secondary students.

In 1982, the school was renamed Phan Van Tri Secondary School, now it is Phan Van Tri High School. The school now has 94 teachers and staff with 1,230 students, including grades 10, 11 and 12.

== Teaching staff ==
The school has 94 staff members, including the principal, two vice principals, eight office staff and 83 teachers. Twelve teachers have master's degrees and 73 teachers have bachelor's degrees.

Areas of instruction include:

- Maths
- Informatics
- Physics
- Industrial Engineering
- Chemistry
- Biology
- English
- Literature
- History
- Civic Education
- Geography
- Physical Education-National Defense

== Education ==
Phan Van Tri High School offers each grade 10th, 11th, and 12th special education. The uniforms for boys and girls consist of blue pants and white shirts. Every Monday, the girls wear Ao dai dresses.

The school has enough rooms for teaching about 32 to 35 classes. In 2020, the school was to expand to 40 classes for 1,500 to 1,600 students.

To be admitted, prospective students must take a written examination consisting of three tests: Mathematics, Literature, and English.

== Principals ==
- 1968 to 1969: Trần Lộc Trọng
- 1969 to 1975: Lê Văn Tập
- 1982 to 1986: Phan Quang Ánh
- 1987 to 1996: Nguyễn Học Sĩ
- 1997 to 2007: Võ Thành Khiêm
- 2008 to 2016: Nguyễn Văn Sang
- 2016 to present: Nguyen Hoang Minh
