= An Bình =

An Bình may refer to several places in Vietnam, including:

- An Bình, Cần Thơ, a ward of Cần Thơ city
- An Bình, Đồng Tháp, a ward of Đồng Tháp province
- An Bình, Vĩnh Long, a commune of Vĩnh Long province
- An Bình, Gia Lai, a ward of Gia Lai province
- An Bình, Phú Thọ, a commune of Phú Thọ province
