= Phong Điền =

Phong Điền may refer to several places in Vietnam, including:

- Phong Điền (town), a district-level town of Huế
- Phong Điền district, a rural district of Cần Thơ
  - Phong Điền (township), a commune-level town and capital of Phong Điền district
- Phong Điền, Cà Mau, a commune of Trần Văn Thời District
- Phong Điền, Cần Thơ, a ward of Cần Thơ
