= Cái Răng district =

Former urban district of Cần Thơ city, Vietnam

Coordinates: 9°59′57″N 105°46′56″E

Cái Răng
- Urban district
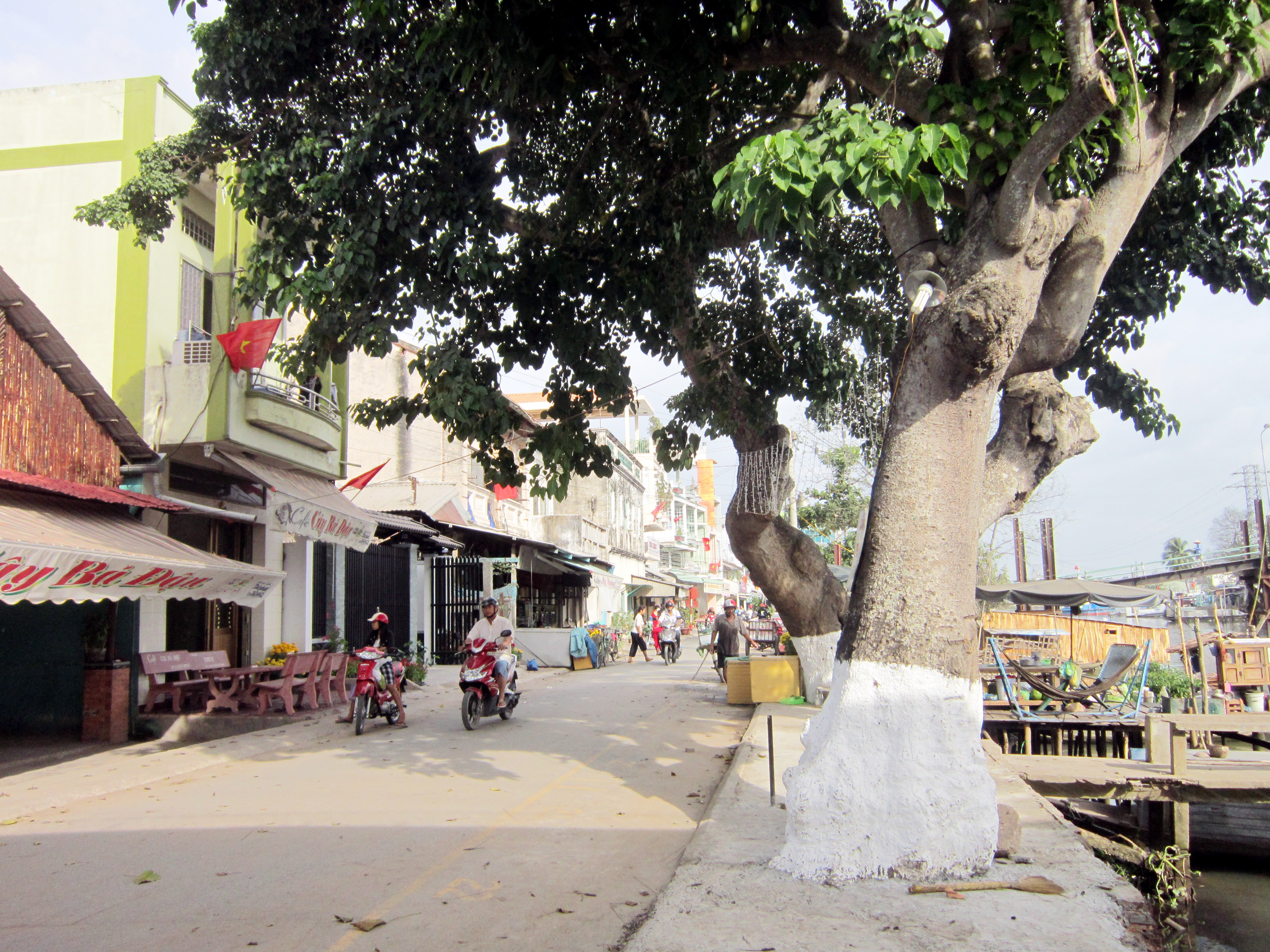
- Interactive map of Cái Răng
- Country: Vietnam
- Region: Mekong Delta
- Centrally- governed city: Cần Thơ
- Dissolution: July 1st, 2025

Area
  - Total: 24 sq mi (63 km^{2})

Population (2019)
  - Total: 105,393
  - Density: 4,330/sq mi (1,673/km^{2})
- Time zone: UTC+7 (Indochina Time)

Cái Răng is a former urban district of Cần Thơ city, Vietnam. The current area of Cái Răng district comprises two Cái Răng and Hưng Phú wards of Cần Thơ city.

As of 2019 the district had a population of 105,393. The district covers an area of 63 km^{2}. Cái Răng district was established by Decree No. 05/2004/ND-CP on January 2, 2004. The district borders Vĩnh Long province to the east, Phong Điền district to the west, Hậu Giang province to the south and Ninh Kiều district to the northwest.

On June 16, 2025, the Standing Committee of the National Assembly issued Resolution No. 1685/NQ-UBTVQH15. The district was dissolved and new wards were rearranged from the district.

== Administrative divisions ==
Cái Răng district is divided into wards (Phường):

- Lê Bình
- Thường Thạnh
- Phú Thứ
- Tân Phú
- Ba Láng
- Hưng Phú
- Hưng Thạnh
