= Cái Răng =

Ward in Cần Thơ city, Vietnam

- Ward
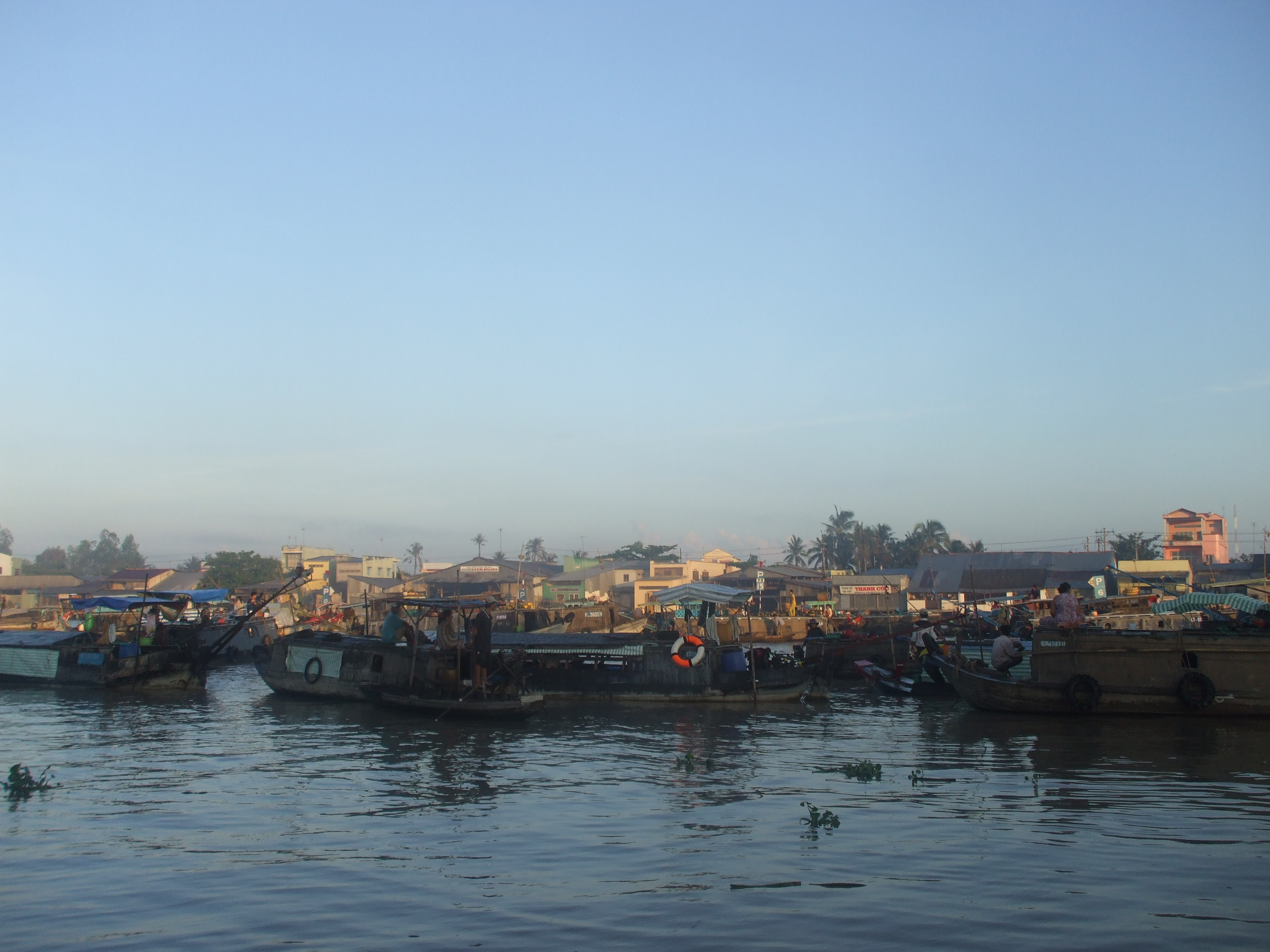
- Cái Răng Floating Market
- Interactive map of Cái Răng
- Coordinates: 9°59′21″N 105°45′28″E
- Country: Vietnam
- Region: Mekong Delta
- Centrally- governed city: Cần Thơ
- Establish: June 16, 2025

Government
  - Type: Ward
  - Body: People's Council of Cái Răng ward

Area
  - Total: 26.88 km^{2} (10.38 sq mi)

Population (2025)
  - Total: 71,106 people
  - Density: 2,645/km^{2} (6,851/sq mi)
- Time zone: UTC+07:00

Cái Răng is a ward in Cần Thơ city, Vietnam. It is one of 103 communes and wards in the city following the 2025 reorganization. The locality has the Cái Răng floating market - a National Intangible Cultural Heritage of Vietnam.

== Geography ==
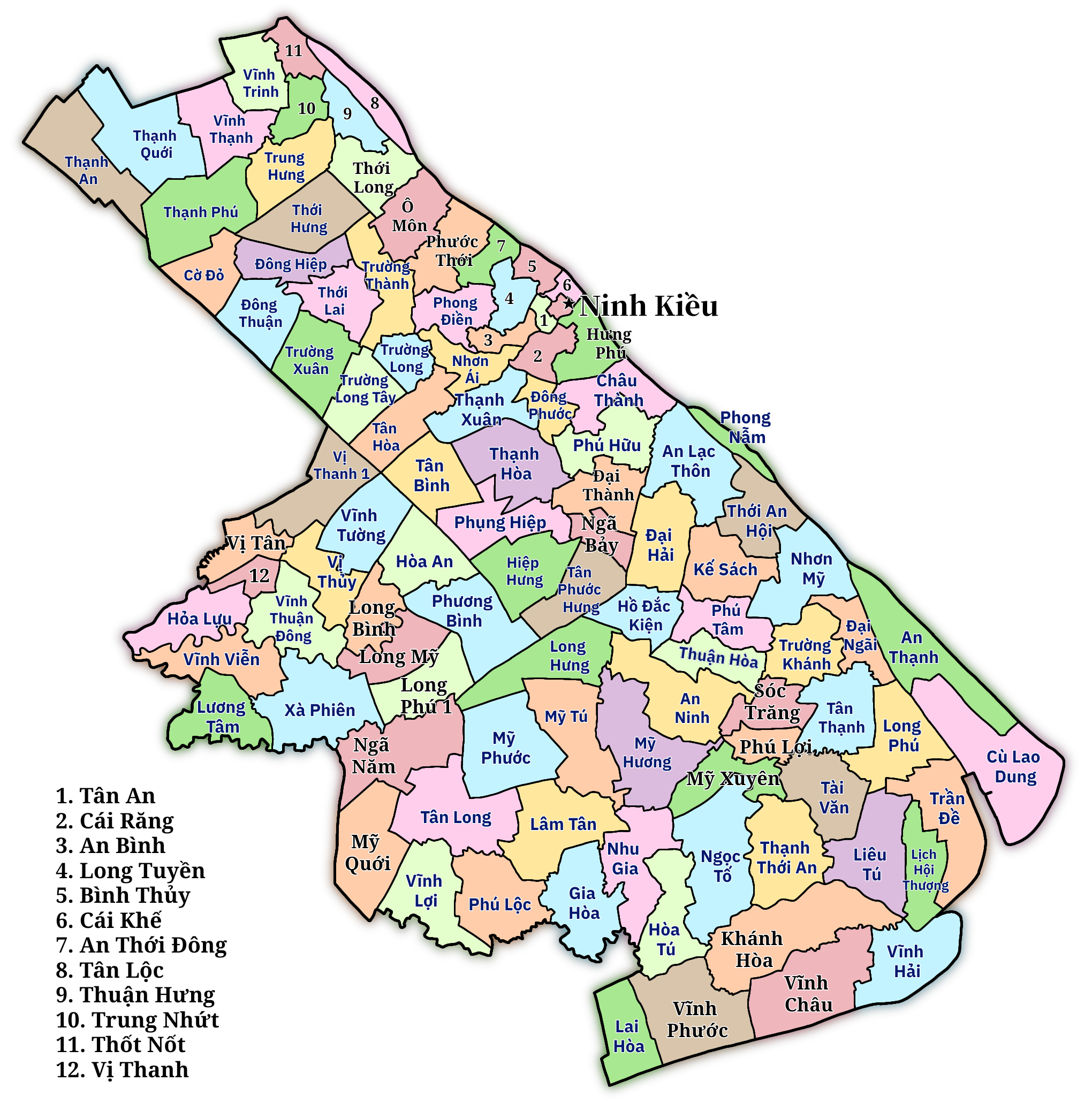
Location of Cái Răng ward on Cần Thơ city map.

Cái Răng is a ward in Cần Thơ city, Vietnam. It is located 40km northeast of Vị Thanh ward and 40km north of Sóc Trăng ward. It borders with Tân An ward to the north; Hưng Phú ward to the east, Đông Phước and Thạnh Xuân communes to the south, An Bình ward and Nhơn Ái commune to the west.

== History ==
Prior to 2025, Cái Răng ward was formerly Ba Láng ward, Hưng Thạnh ward, Lê Bình ward, and Thường Thạnh ward belonging to Cái Răng district, Cần Thơ city.

On June 12, 2025, the National Assembly of Vietnam issued Resolution No. 202/2025/QH15 on the reorganization of provincial-level administrative units. Accordingly:

- Cần Thơ city was established by merging the entire area and population of Cần Thơ city, Hậu Giang and Sóc Trăng provinces.

On June 16, 2025, the Standing Committee of the National Assembly of Vietnam issued Resolution No. 1668/NQ-UBTVQH15 on the reorganization of commune-level administrative units in Cần Thơ city. Accordingly:

- The Cái Răng ward was established by merging the entire area and population of Ba Láng, Hưng Thạnh, Lê Bình and Thường Thạnh wards (formerly part of Cái Răng district).
