= Phong Điền, Cần Thơ =

Phong Điền
- Commune
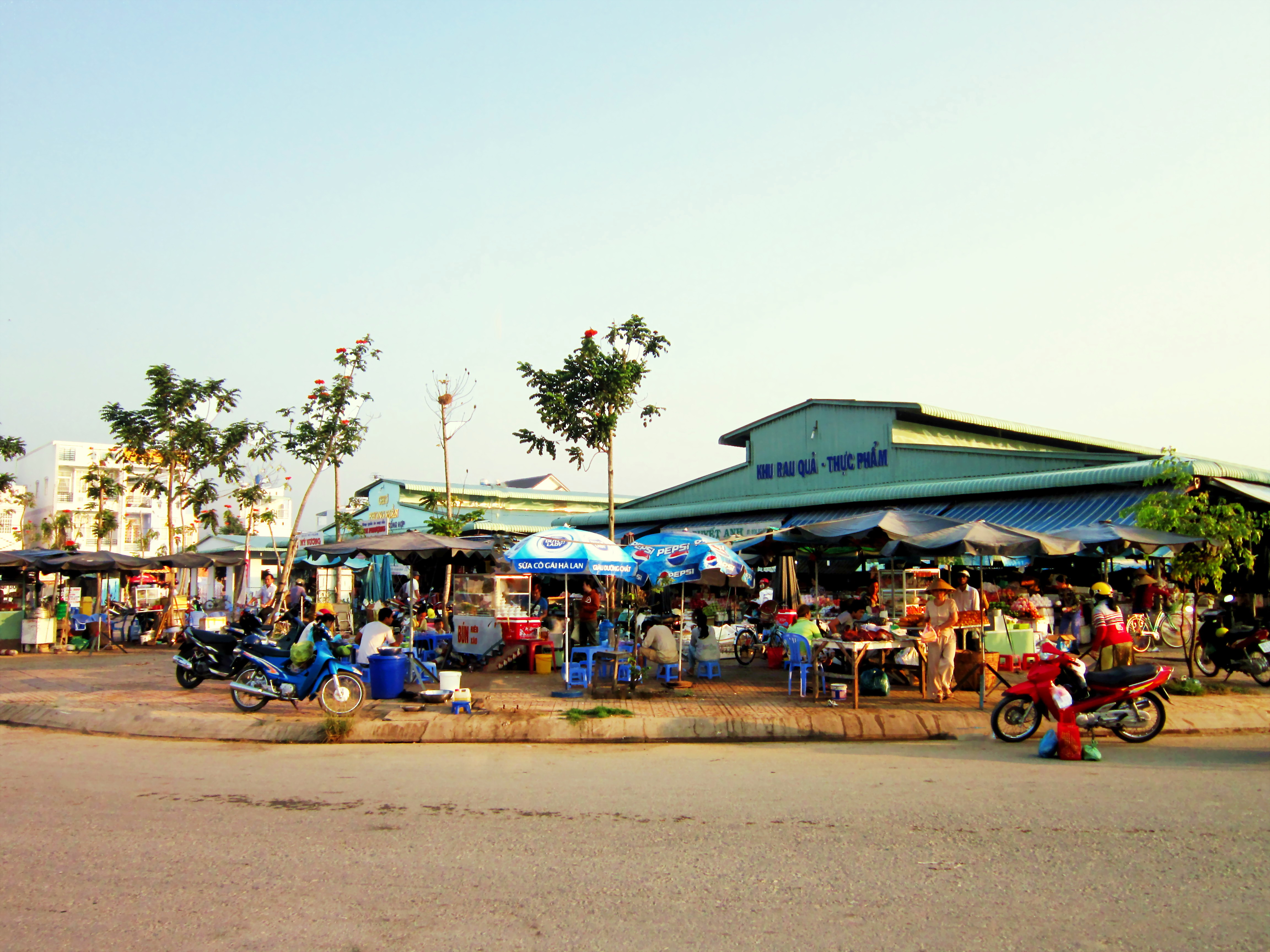
- The new market in Phong Điền
- Interactive map of Phong Điền
- Coordinates: 10°0′20″N 105°40′12″E
- Country: Vietnam
- Municipality: Cần Thơ
- Region: Mekong Delta
- Established: 16 June 2025
- Seat: Nguyễn Thái Bình Street, Ấp Nhơn Lộc 2

Area
  - Total: 45.58 km^{2} (17.60 sq mi)

Population (31 December 2024)
  - Total: 51,949
  - Density: 1,139/km^{2} (2,950/sq mi)
- Website: phongdien.cantho.gov.vn

Phong Điền is a commune in Cần Thơ, Vietnam.

On 12 June 2025, the National Assembly of Vietnam adopted Resolution No. 202/2025/QH15 on the reorganization of provincial-level administrative units, which took effect on the same date. Under the resolution, Hậu Giang province and Sóc Trăng province were merged into Cần Thơ.

On 16 June 2025, the National Assembly adopted Resolution No. 203/2025/QH15 on amendments and supplements to several articles of the Constitution of the Socialist Republic of Vietnam. Under the resolution, district-level administrative units nationwide ceased operations from 1 July 2025.

Also on 16 June 2025, the Standing Committee of the National Assembly of Vietnam adopted Resolution No. 1668/NQ-UBTVQH15 on the reorganization of commune-level administrative units in Cần Thơ in 2025. Under the resolution, Phong Điền commune was established in Cần Thơ from the entire area and population of Phong Điền township and the communes of Giai Xuân and Tân Thới in the former Phong Điền district.
