= Nguyễn Hiếu Trung Anh =

Vietnamese footballer

Personal information
- Full name: Nguyễn Hiếu Trung Anh
- Date of birth: June 12, 1992 (age 34)
- Place of birth: Ninh Kiều, Cần Thơ, Vietnam
- Height: 1.70 m (5 ft 7 in)
- Positions: Defender; midfielder

Team information
- Current team: Cần Thơ
- Number: 32

Youth career
- 2006–2014: Cần Thơ

Senior career*
Years	Team	Apps	(Gls)
2015–	Cần Thơ	78	(3)
- * Club domestic league appearances and goals as of 2 October 2018

Nguyễn Hiếu Trung Anh (born 12 June 1992) is a Vietnamese footballer who plays as a defender or midfielder for V.League 2 club Cần Thơ.
