= Hưng Phú, Cần Thơ =

Hưng Phú
- Ward
- Interactive map of Hưng Phú
- Country: Vietnam
- Municipality: Cần Thơ
- Establish: June 16, 2025

Area
  - Total: 40.93 km^{2} (15.80 sq mi)

Population
  - Total: 58,543 people
  - Density: 1,430/km^{2} (3,705/sq mi)
- Time zone: UTC+07:00

Hưng Phú is a ward in Cần Thơ municipality, Vietnam. It is one of 103 communes and wards in the province following the 2025 reorganization.

== Geography ==
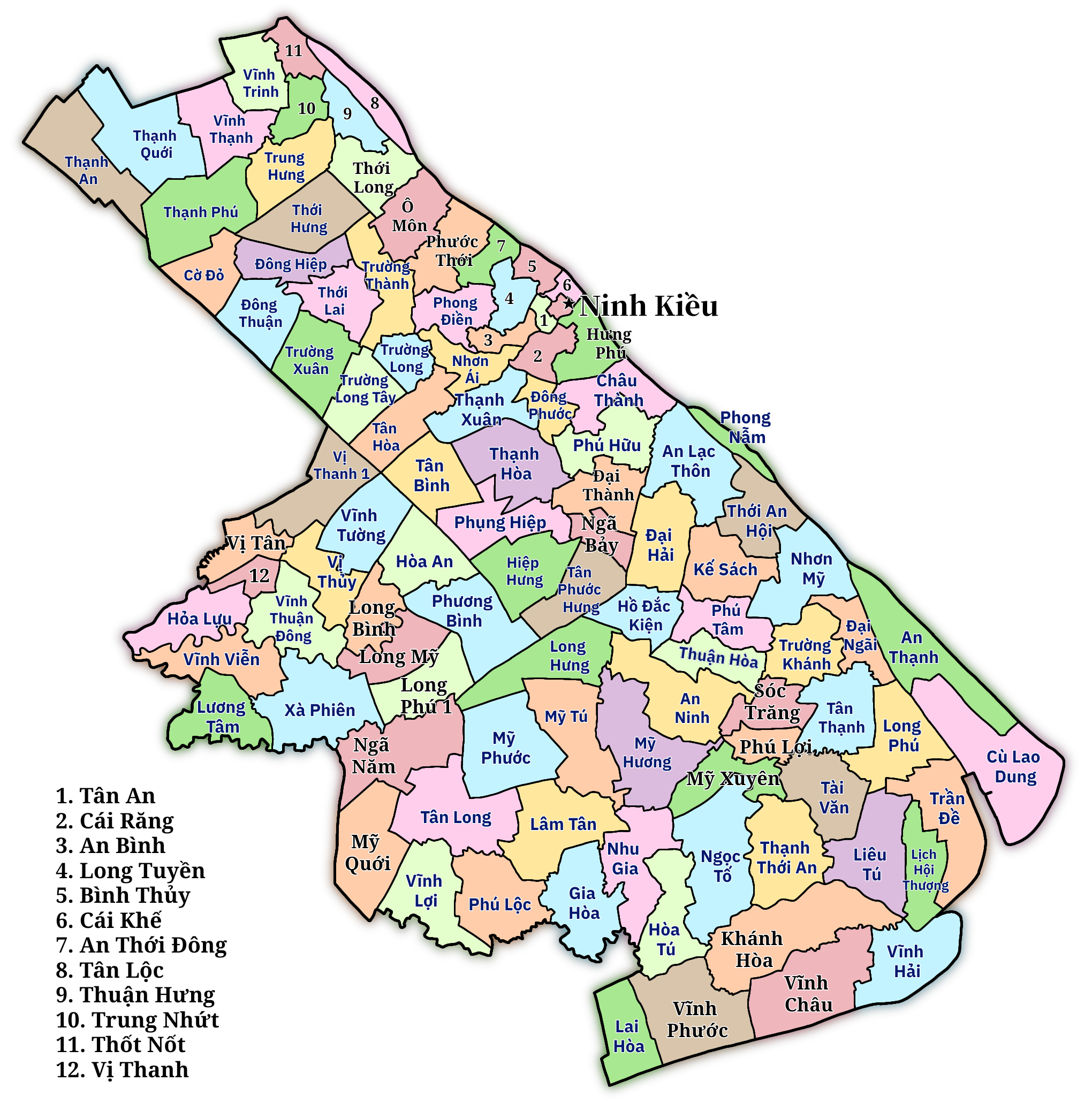
Location of Hưng Phú ward on Cần Thơ municipality map.

Hưng Phú ward has the following geographical location:

- To the south, it borders Châu Thành commune.
- To the west, it borders Cái Răng ward and Tân An ward.
- To the north, it borders Ninh Kiều ward and Cái Khế ward.

== History ==
Prior to 2025, Hưng Phú ward consisted of Hưng Phú, Phú Thứ, and Tân Phú wards in Cái Răng district, Cần Thơ municipality.

On June 12, 2025, the National Assembly of Vietnam issued Resolution No. 202/2025/QH15 on the reorganization of provincial-level administrative units. Accordingly:

- Cần Thơ municipality was established by merging the entire area and population of Cần Thơ municipality, Hậu Giang province, and Sóc Trăng province.

On June 16, 2025, the Standing Committee of the National Assembly of Vietnam issued Resolution No. 1668/NQ-UBTVQH15 on the reorganization of commune-level administrative units in Cần Thơ municipality. Accordingly:

- Hưng Phú ward was established by merging the entire area and population of Hưng Phú ward, Phú Thứ ward and Tân Phú ward (formerly part of Cái Răng district).
