= Vĩnh Thanh, Cà Mau =

Coordinates: 9°46′N 105°34′E

Vĩnh Thanh
- Rural commune and village
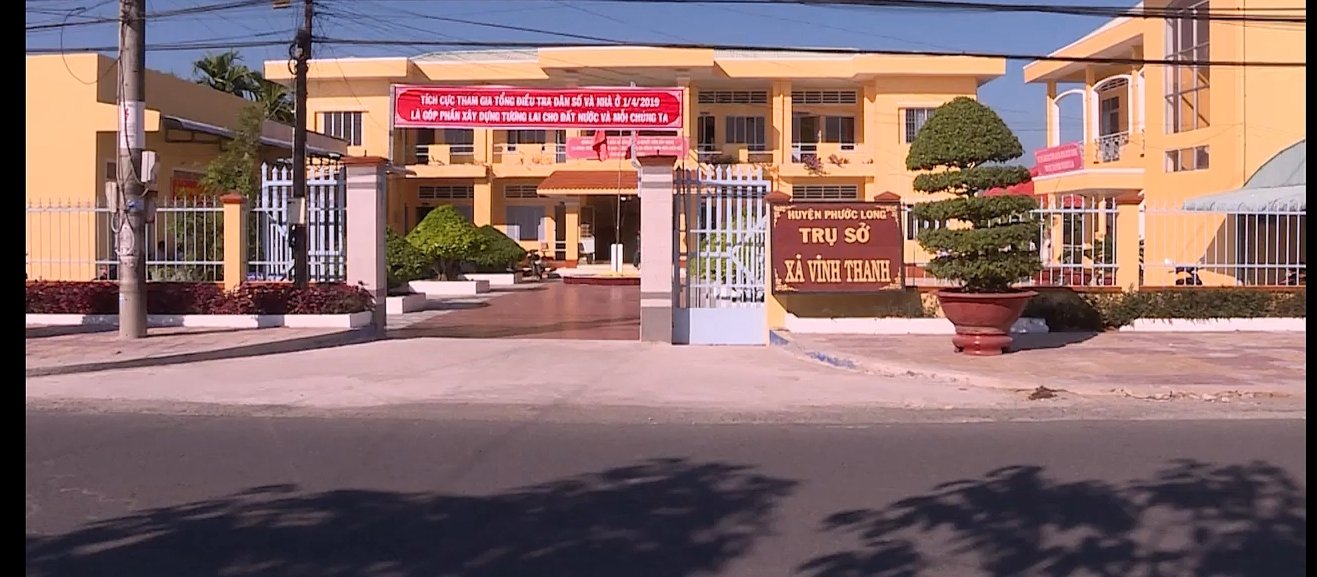
- Interactive map of Vĩnh Thanh
- Country: Vietnam
- Province: Cà Mau

Area
  - 2024: 29.07 sq mi (75.30 km^{2})

Population
  - 2024: 36,959
  - Density: 1,271/sq mi (490.8/km^{2})
- Time zone: UTC+07:00 (Indochina Time)
- Postal code: 31882

Vĩnh Thanh is a rural commune (xã) and village in Cà Mau Province, in south-western Vietnam.

The Standing Committee of the National Assembly issued Resolution No. 1655/NQ-UBTVQH15 on the rearrangement of commune-level administrative units of Cà Mau Province in 2025 (the resolution takes effect from June 16, 2025). Accordingly, Vĩnh Thanh Commune was established in Cà Mau Province on the basis of the entire 37.93 km² of natural area and a population of 17,668 people of Hưng Phú Commune, and the entire 37.37 km² of natural area and a population of 19,291 people of Vĩnh Thanh Commune, formerly belonging to Phước Long District, Bạc Liêu Province.
