= Long Hòa, Ho Chi Minh City =

Long Hòa Xã Long Hòa Long Nguyên, Thị Tính
- Commune
- Interactive map of Long Hòa
- Coordinates: 11°20′24″N 106°30′10″E
- Country: Vietnam
- Municipality: Ho Chi Minh City
- Established: June 16, 2025

Area
  - Total: 64.39 sq mi (166.76 km^{2})

Population (2024)
  - Total: 25,215
  - Density: 391.62/sq mi (151.21/km^{2})
- Time zone: UTC+07:00 (Indochina Time)
- Administrative code: 25792

Long Hòa (Vietnamese: Xã Long Hòa) is a commune of Ho Chi Minh City, Vietnam. It is one of the 168 new wards, communes and special zones of the city following the reorganization in 2025.

== History ==
On June 16, 2025, the National Assembly Standing Committee issued Resolution No. 1685/NQ-UBTVQH15 on the arrangement of commune-level administrative units of Ho Chi Minh City in 2025 (effective from June 16, 2025). Accordingly, the entire land area and population of Long Tân, Long Hòa communes and part of Minh Tân, Minh Thạnh communes of the former Dầu Tiếng district will be integrated into a new commune named Long Hòa (Clause 144, Article 1).
