= Phong Điền district =

Coordinates: 9°59′57″N 105°39′35″E

Phong Điền district Huyện Phong Điền
- District
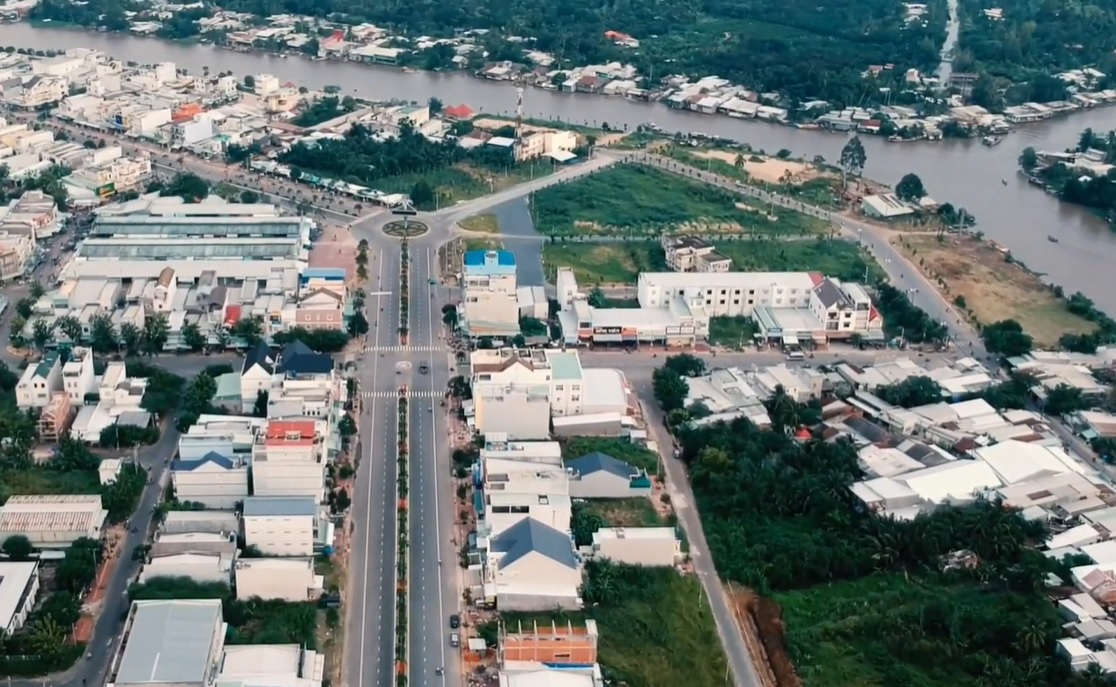
- Overlooking Phong Điền town

- Seal
- Interactive map of Phong Điền district
- Country: Vietnam
- Province: Cần Thơ

Area
  - Total: 46 sq mi (119 km^{2})

Population (2018)
  - Total: 123,136
  - Density: 2,680/sq mi (1,030/km^{2})
- Time zone: UTC+7 (Indochina Time)
- Administrative code: 926

Phong Điền is a former rural district of Cần Thơ in the Mekong Delta region of Vietnam.

== Demographics ==
As of 2003, the district had a population of 102,621. As of 2018, the population had risen to 123,126. The district covers an area of 119 km^{2} (46 sq mi).

== History ==
Phong Điền was established by Decree No. 05/2004/ND-CP dated January 2, 2004. To the east it borders Ninh Kiều district and Cái Răng district, and to the west it borders Hậu Giang province and Bình Thủy district.

On June 16, 2025, the Standing Committee of the National Assembly issued Resolution No. 1685/NQ-UBTVQH15. The district was dissolved and new wards were rearranged from the district.

== Administrative divisions ==
The district is divided into one town, Phong Điền (753.82 ha, 11,852 people (2007)), with municipal status, and 6 communes:

- Nhơn Ái: 1,559.5 ha, 15,031 people (2007)
- Nhơn Nghĩa
- Tân Thới
- Giai Xuân
- Mỹ Khánh
- Trường Long
