= Bình Thủy district =

Coordinates: 10°03′42″N 105°43′17″E

Bình Thủy district Quận Bình Thủy
- Urban district
- Nam Nhã Temple
- Interactive map of Bình Thủy district
- Country: Vietnam
- Province: Cần Thơ

Area
  - Total: 27 sq mi (69 km^{2})

Population (2018)
  - Total: 172,317
- Time zone: UTC+07:00 (Indochina Time)

Bình Thủy was a district of Cần Thơ in the Mekong Delta region of Vietnam. As of 2003 the district had a population of 87,665. The district covers an area of 69 km^{2}.

On June 16, 2025, the Standing Committee of the National Assembly issued Resolution No. 1685/NQ-UBTVQH15. The district was dissolved and new wards were rearranged from the district.

== Administrative divisions ==
The district is divided into 8 wards (phường):

- Trà Nóc: 712 ha, 10,513 people (2007)
- Trà An: 565.67 ha, 5,339 people (2007)
- An Thới: 384.83 ha, 14,445 people (2007)
- Bùi Hữu Nghĩa: 637.12 ha, 11,185 people (2007)
- Thới An Đông: 1,167.56 ha, 9,438 people (2004)
- Bình Thuỷ
- Long Tuyền: 1,413.55 ha, 13,250 people (2004)
- Long Hoà: 1,395.08 ha, 13,471 people (2004).

== Notable landmarks ==
- Đình Bình Thủy
- Long Quang Pagoda
