= Ninh Kiều district =

Coordinates: 10°00′36″N 105°27′00″E

Ninh Kiều district Quận Ninh Kiều
- Former urban district
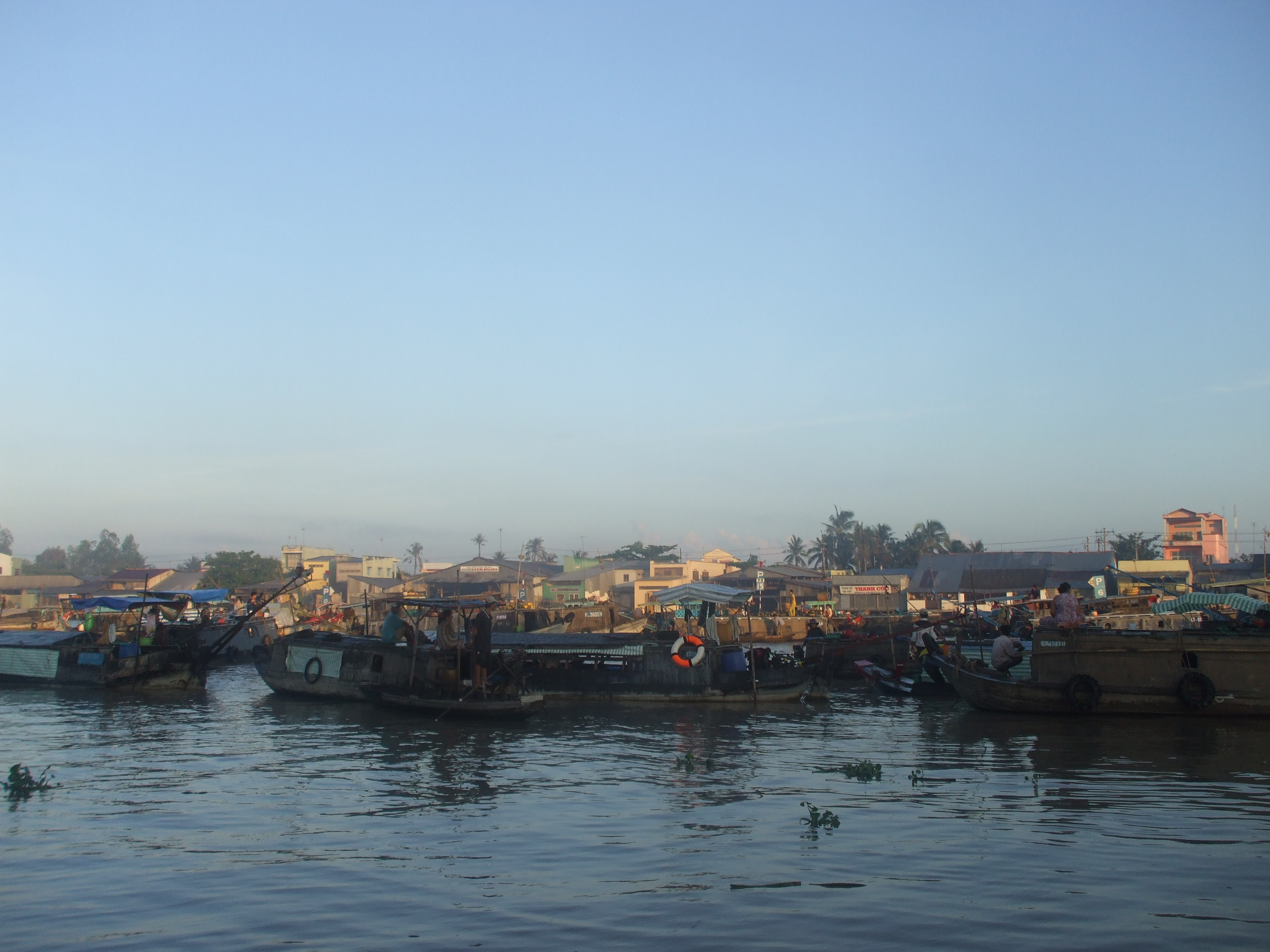
- Country: Vietnam
- Province: Cần Thơ

Area
  - Total: 11.28 sq mi (29.22 km^{2})

Population (2018)
  - Total: 304,175
- Time zone: UTC+07:00 (Indochina Time)

Ninh Kiều is a former urban district (quận) of Cần Thơ in the Mekong Delta region of Vietnam. Ninh Kiều is located at the centre of Cần Thơ. Most of Cần Thơ's municipal offices are located here.

On June 16, 2025, the Standing Committee of the National Assembly issued Resolution No. 1685/NQ-UBTVQH15. The district was dissolved and new wards were rearranged from the district.

== Geography ==
Ninh Kiều is located along the Bassac River.

== Populations ==
Ninh Kiều's population in 2004 was 209,274, and 304,175 in 2018, and it has an area of 29.22 km^{2}.

== Administration ==
The district has a total of 11 wards:

1. Phường An Bình
2. Phường An Cư
3. Phường An Hoà
4. Phường An Khánh
5. Phường An Nghiệp
6. Phường An Phú
7. Phường Cái Khế
8. Phường Hưng Lợi
9. Phường Tân An
10. Phường Thới Bình
11. Phường Xuân Khánh

== Notable people ==
- Nguyễn Hiếu Trung Anh (born 1992), Vietnamese footballer
