= Vị Thanh =

Vị Thanh may refer to the following:

- Vị Thanh, Cần Thơ: ward of Cần Thơ municipality
- Vị Thanh 1: commune of Cần Thơ municipality
- Vị Thanh (city): former provincial city and capital of the former Hậu Giang province
- Former Vi Thanh district belonged to Hậu Giang former province, later belonged to Cần Thơ province; now corresponds to Vị Thanh city and Vị Thủy district
- Vị Thanh old town belongs to Vị Thanh district; now corresponds to the wards I, III, IV, V of Vị Thanh city
