= Long My (disambiguation) =

Long Mỹ may refer to several places in Vietnam, including:

- Long Mỹ, Cần Thơ; a ward of Cần Thơ municipality
- Long Mỹ (town), a former district-level town of Hậu Giang Province
- Long Mỹ district, a former rural district of Hậu Giang Province
- Long Mỹ, Bà Rịa–Vũng Tàu, a former commune of Đất Đỏ District
- Long Mỹ, Bến Tre, a former commune of Giồng Trôm District
- Long Mỹ, Vĩnh Long, a former commune of Mang Thít District
