= Long Bình =

Long Bình may refer to several places in Vietnam:

- Long Bình, Ho Chi Minh City: a ward in the former Thủ Đức city (previously District 9)
- Long Bình, Cần Thơ: a ward in the former Long Mỹ town
- Long Bình, Đồng Nai: a ward in the former Biên Hòa city
  - Long Binh Post, a US military base at Long Bình ward, 1965–1975
  - Long Bình Jail, a U.S. military stockade at Long Binh Post, 1966–1973
- Long Bình, Đồng Tháp, a commune in the former Gò Công Tây district
