= Vị Tân =

Ward in Cần Thơ city, Vietnam

- Ward
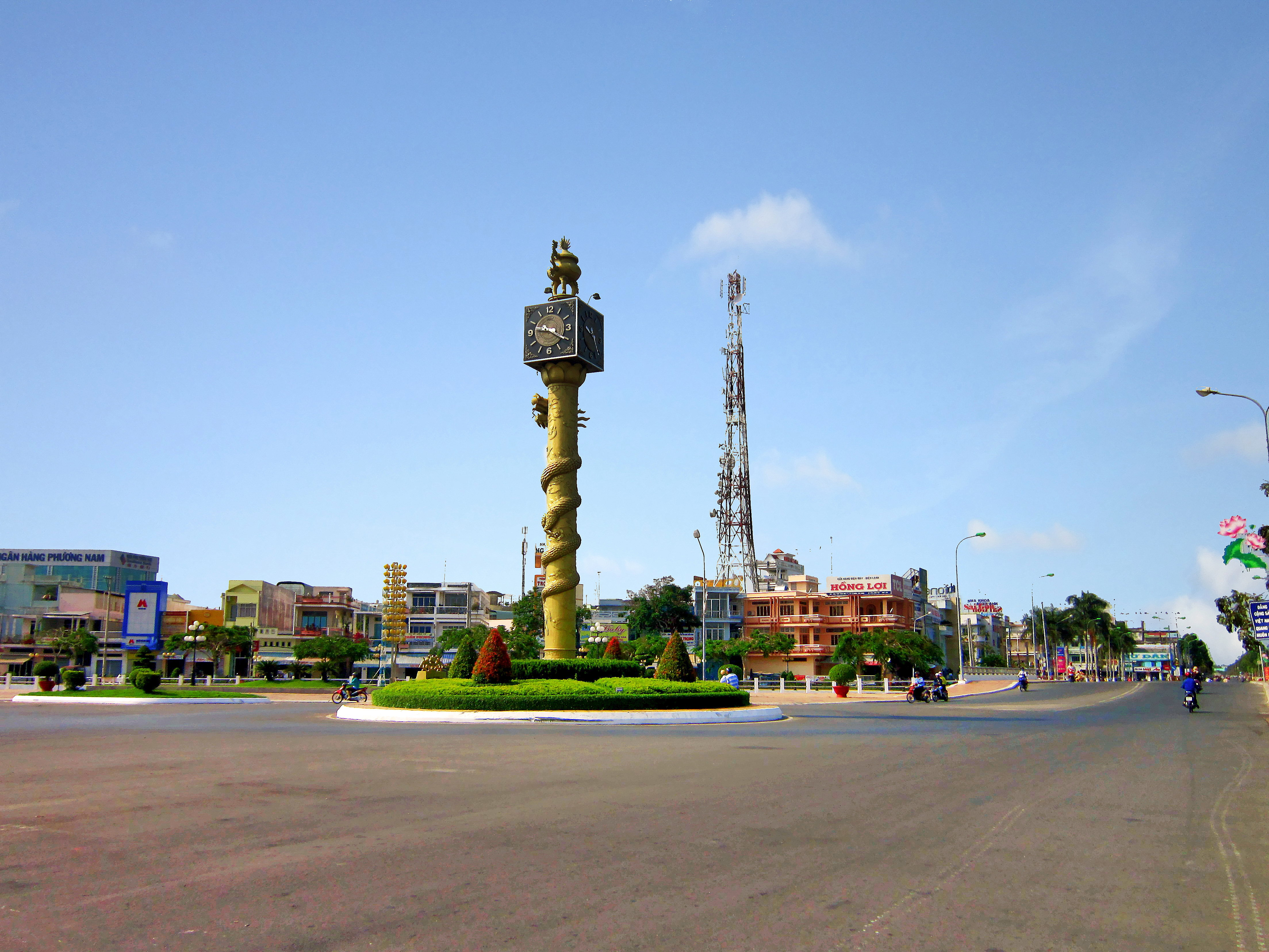
- Clock tower in Vị Tân
- Interactive map of Vị Tân
- Country: Vietnam
- Region: Mekong Delta
- Centrally- governed city: Cần Thơ
- Establish: June 16, 2025

Area
  - Total: 37.07 km^{2} (14.31 sq mi)

Population (2025)
  - Total: 36,079 people
  - Density: 973.3/km^{2} (2,521/sq mi)

Vị Tân is a ward in Cần Thơ city, Vietnam. It is one of 103 wards and communes in the city following the 2025 reorganization.

== Geography ==
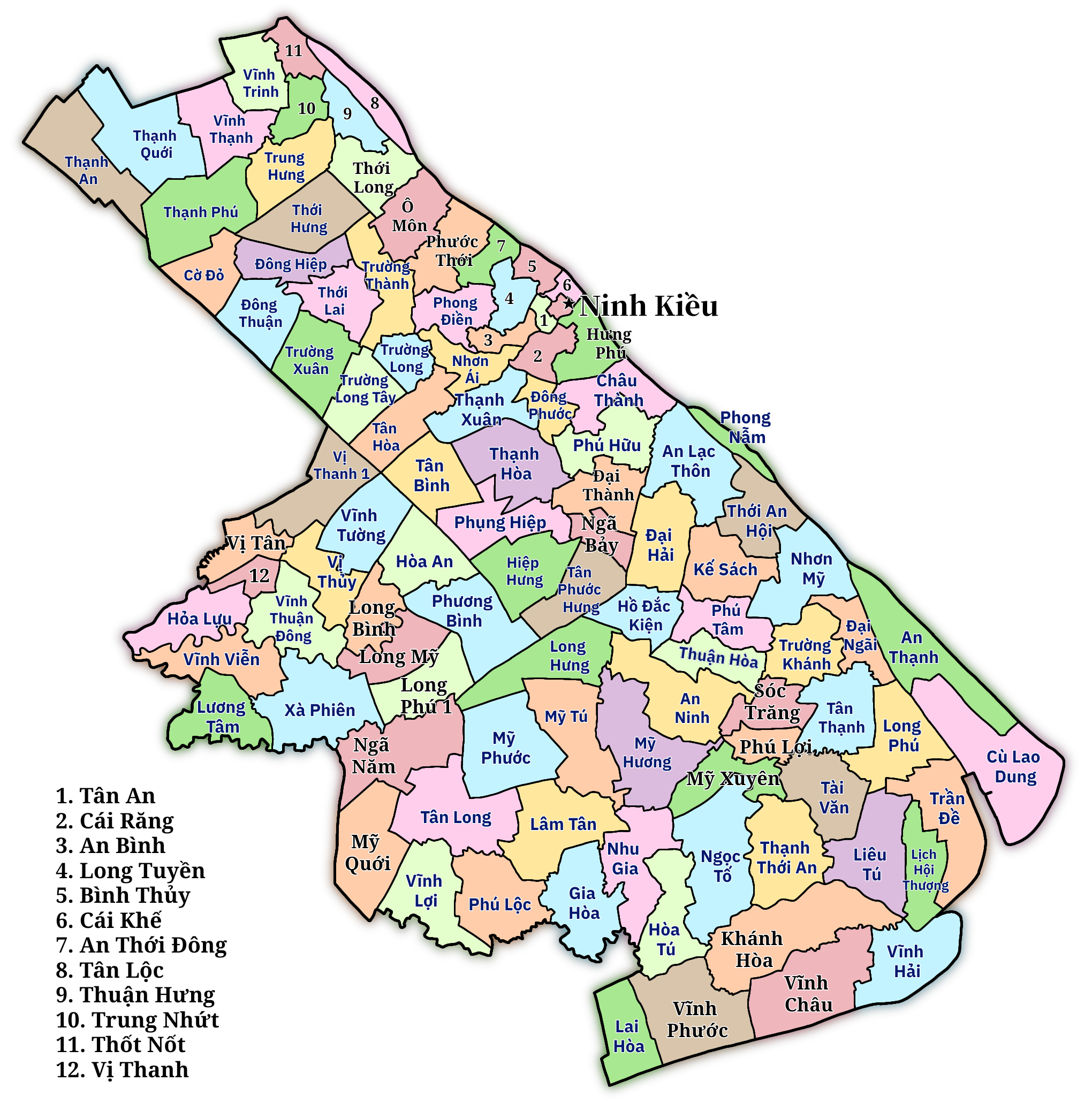
Location of Vị Tân ward on Cần Thơ city map.

Vị Tân ward has the following geographical location:

- To the west, it borders An Giang province.
- To the north, it borders Vị Thanh 1 commune.
- To the east it borders Vị Thủy commune.
- To the south, it borders Vị Thanh ward.

== History ==
Prior to 2025, Vị Tân ward was formerly wards IV and V and Vị Tân commune of Vị Thanh provincial city, Hậu Giang province.

On June 12, 2025, the National Assembly of Vietnam issued Resolution No. 202/2025/QH15 on the reorganization of provincial-level administrative units. Cần Thơ city was established by merging the entire area and population of Cần Thơ city, Hậu Giang province, and Sóc Trăng province.

On June 16, 2025, the Standing Committee of the National Assembly of Vietnam issued Resolution No. 1668/NQ-UBTVQH15 on the reorganization of commune-level administrative units in Cần Thơ city. Vị Tân ward was established by merging the entire area and population of Wards IV and V and Vị Tân commune (formerly part of Vị Thanh provincial city).
