= Vị Thanh, Cần Thơ =

Ward in Cần Thơ city, Vietnam

Vị Thanh
- Ward
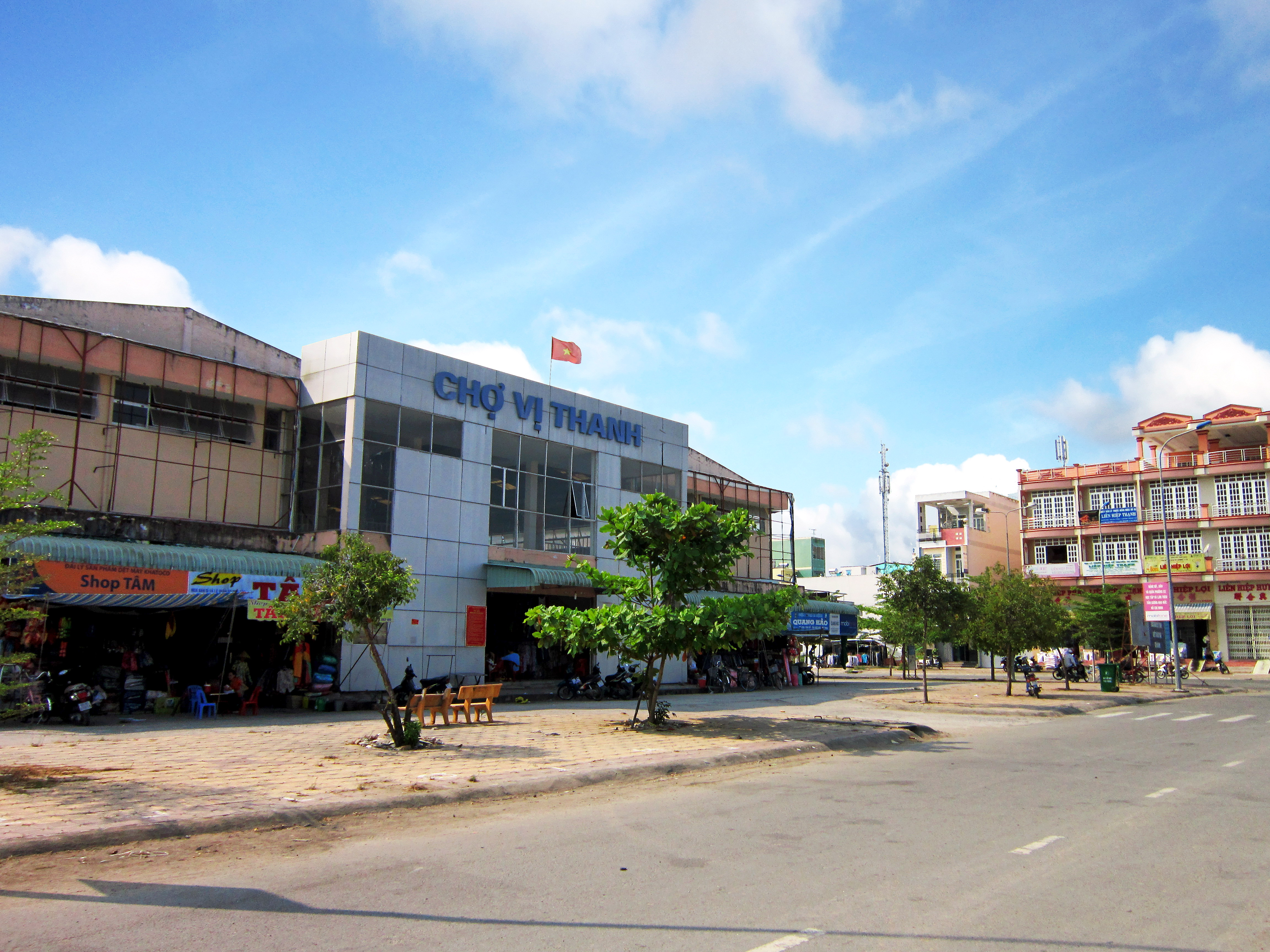
- Vị Thanh market
- Country: Vietnam
- Region: Mekong Delta
- Centrally- governed city: Cần Thơ
- Establish: June 16, 2025

Government
  - Type: Ward
  - Body: People's Council of Vị Thanh ward

Area
  - Total: 22.11 km^{2} (8.54 sq mi)

Population (2025)
  - Total: 32,766 people
  - Density: 1,482/km^{2} (3,838/sq mi)
- Time zone: UTC+07:00

Vị Thanh is a ward in Cần Thơ city, Vietnam. It is one of 103 wards and communes in the city following the 2025 reorganization.

== Geography ==
Location of Vị Thanh ward on Cần Thơ municipality map.

Vị Thanh ward has the following geographical location:

- To the north, it borders Vị Tân ward.
- To the east and southeast, it borders Vĩnh Thuận Đông commune.
- To the southwest, it borders Hỏa Lựu commune.
- To the west, it borders An Giang province.

== History ==
Prior to 2025, Vị Thanh ward consisted of wards I, III, and VII of Vị Thanh provincial city, Hậu Giang province.

On June 12, 2025, the National Assembly of Vietnam issued Resolution No. 202/2025/QH15 on the reorganization of provincial-level administrative units. Cần Thơ city was established by merging the entire area and population of Cần Thơ city, Hậu Giang, and Sóc Trăng provinces.

On June 16, 2025, the Standing Committee of the National Assembly of Vietnam issued Resolution No. 1663/NQ-UBTVQH15 on the reorganization of commune-level administrative units in Cần Thơ city. Vị Thanh ward was established by merging the entire area and population of wards I, III, and VII (formerly part of Vị Thanh provincial city).
