= Long Bình, Cần Thơ =

Long Bình
- Ward
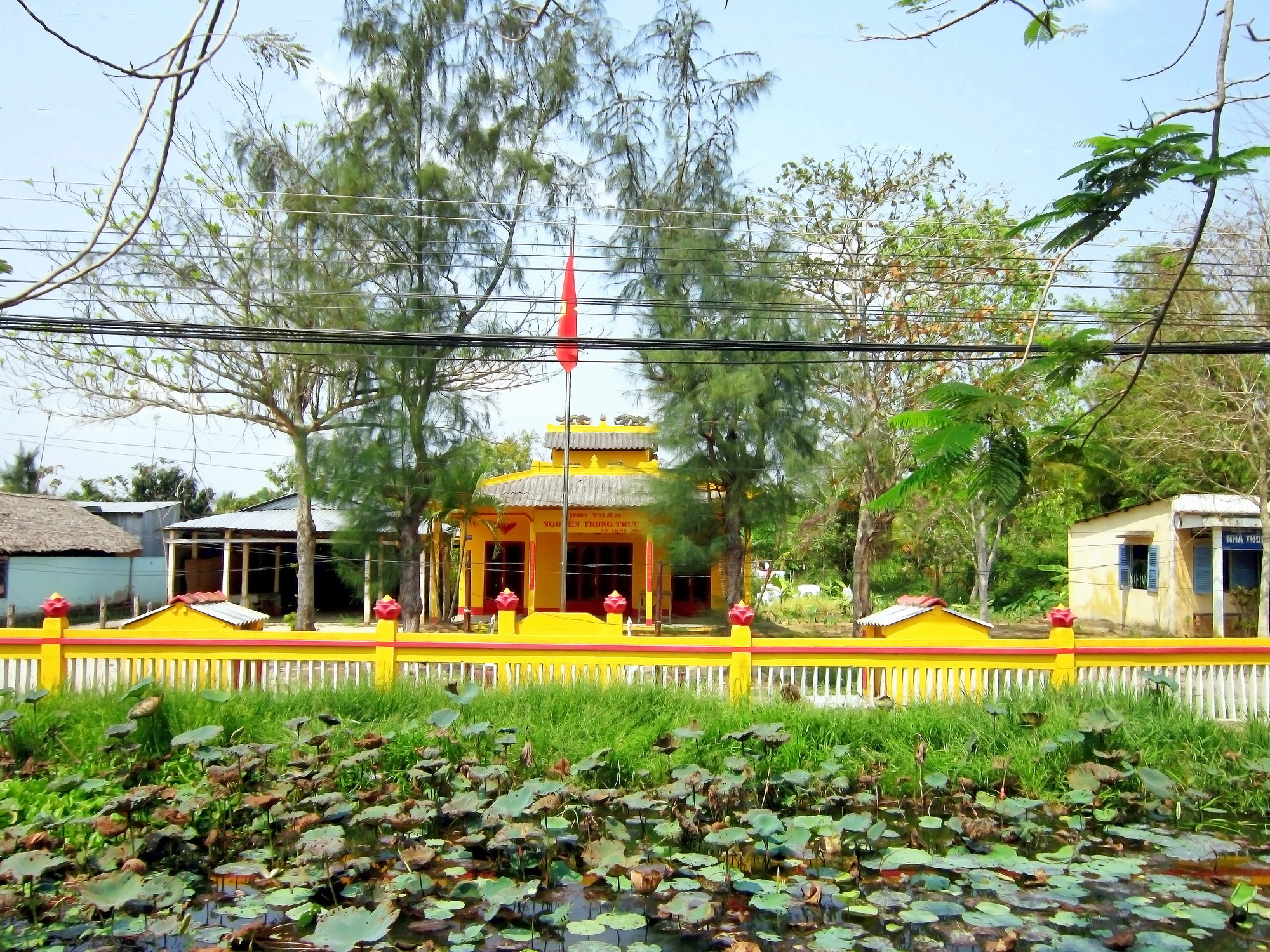
- Nguyễn Trung Trực temple.
- Country: Vietnam
- Municipality: Cần Thơ
- Establish: June 16, 2025

Area
  - Total: 40.20 km^{2} (15.52 sq mi)

Population (2025)
  - Total: 26,378 people
  - Density: 656.2/km^{2} (1,699/sq mi)
- Time zone: UTC+07:00

Long Bình is a ward in Cần Thơ municipality, Vietnam. It is one of 103 communes and wards in the province following the 2025 reorganization.

== Geography ==
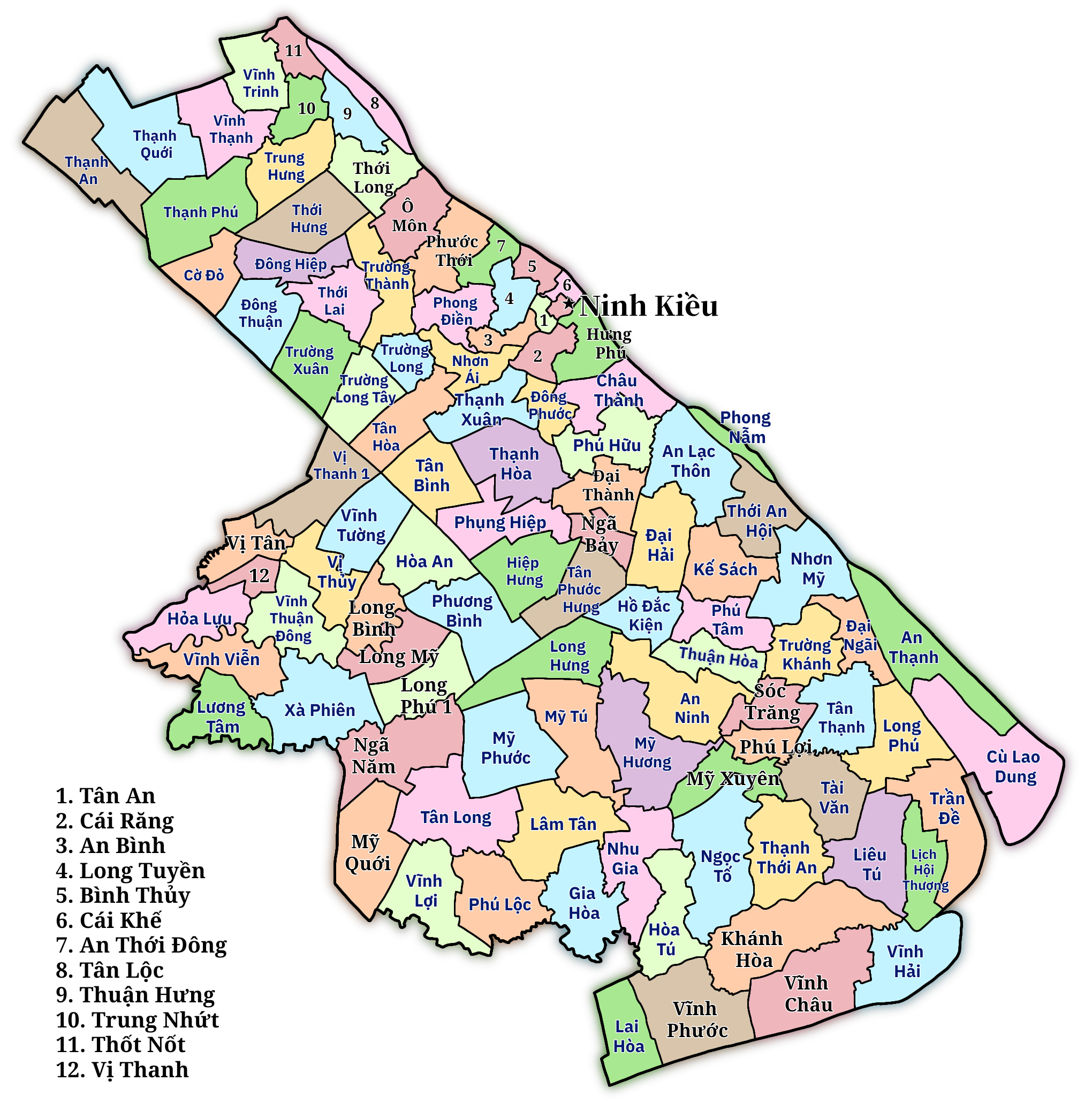
Location of Long Bình ward on Cần Thơ municipality map.

Long Bình ward has the following geographical location:

- To the south, it borders Long Mỹ ward.
- To the west, it borders Vị Thủy and Vĩnh Thuận Đông communes.
- To the north, it borders Vĩnh Tường commune.
- To the east, it borders Hòa An commune and Phương Bình commune.

== History ==
Prior to 2025, Long Bình ward was formerly Vĩnh Tường ward, Bình Thạnh ward, Long Bình commune of Long Mỹ district-level town, Hậu Giang province.

On June 12, 2025, the National Assembly of Vietnam issued Resolution No. 202/2025/QH15 on the reorganization of provincial-level administrative units. Accordingly:

- Cần Thơ municipality was established by merging the entire area and population of Cần Thơ municipality, Hậu Giang province, and Sóc Trăng province.

On June 16, 2025, the Standing Committee of the National Assembly of Vietnam issued Resolution No. 1668/NQ-UBTVQH15 on the reorganization of commune-level administrative units in Cần Thơ municipality. Accordingly:

- Long Bình ward was established by merging the entire area and population of Bình Thạnh ward, Vĩnh Tường ward, and Long Bình commune (formerly part of Long Mỹ district-level town).
