= Vị Thủy district =

Coordinates: 9.800°N 105.550°E

Vị Thủy district Huyện Vị Thủy
- District
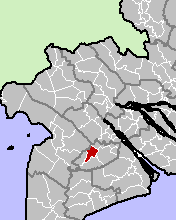
- Location in Hậu Giang province
- Country: Vietnam
- Region: Mekong Delta
- Province: Hậu Giang

Population (2019)
  - Total: 90,126
- Time zone: UTC+7 (Indochina Time)

Vị Thủy is a rural district of Hậu Giang province in the Mekong Delta region of Vietnam.

== Geography ==
Vi Thuy district has the following geographical location:

The east borders Phung Hiep district The West borders Vi Thanh city and Giong Rieng district, Kien Giang province The South borders Long My town and Long My district The North borders Chau Thanh A district.
