= Vĩnh Viễn =

- Commune
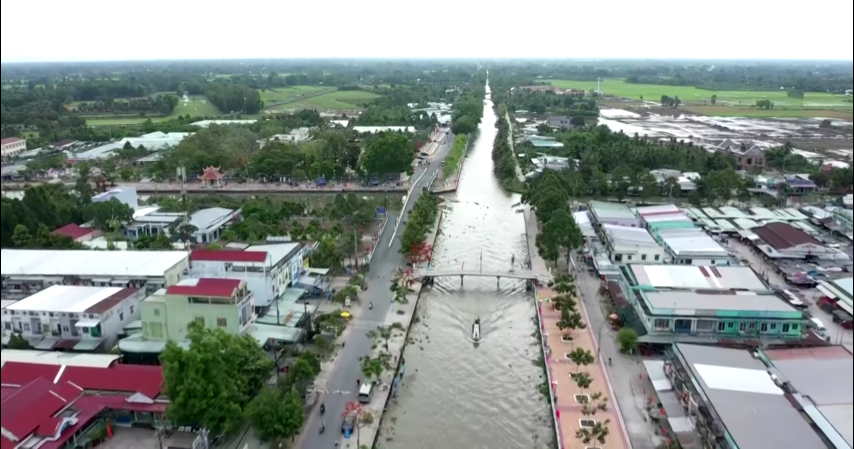
- Interactive map of Vĩnh Viễn
- Country: Vietnam
- Centrally- governed city: Cần Thơ
- Establish: June 16, 2025

Area
  - Total: 68.86 km^{2} (26.59 sq mi)

Population (2025)
  - Total: 24,432 people
  - Density: 354.8/km^{2} (918.9/sq mi)
- Time zone: UTC+07:00

Vĩnh Viễn is a commune in Cần Thơ city, Vietnam. It is one of 103 communes and wards in the municipality after following the 2025 reorganization.

== Geography ==
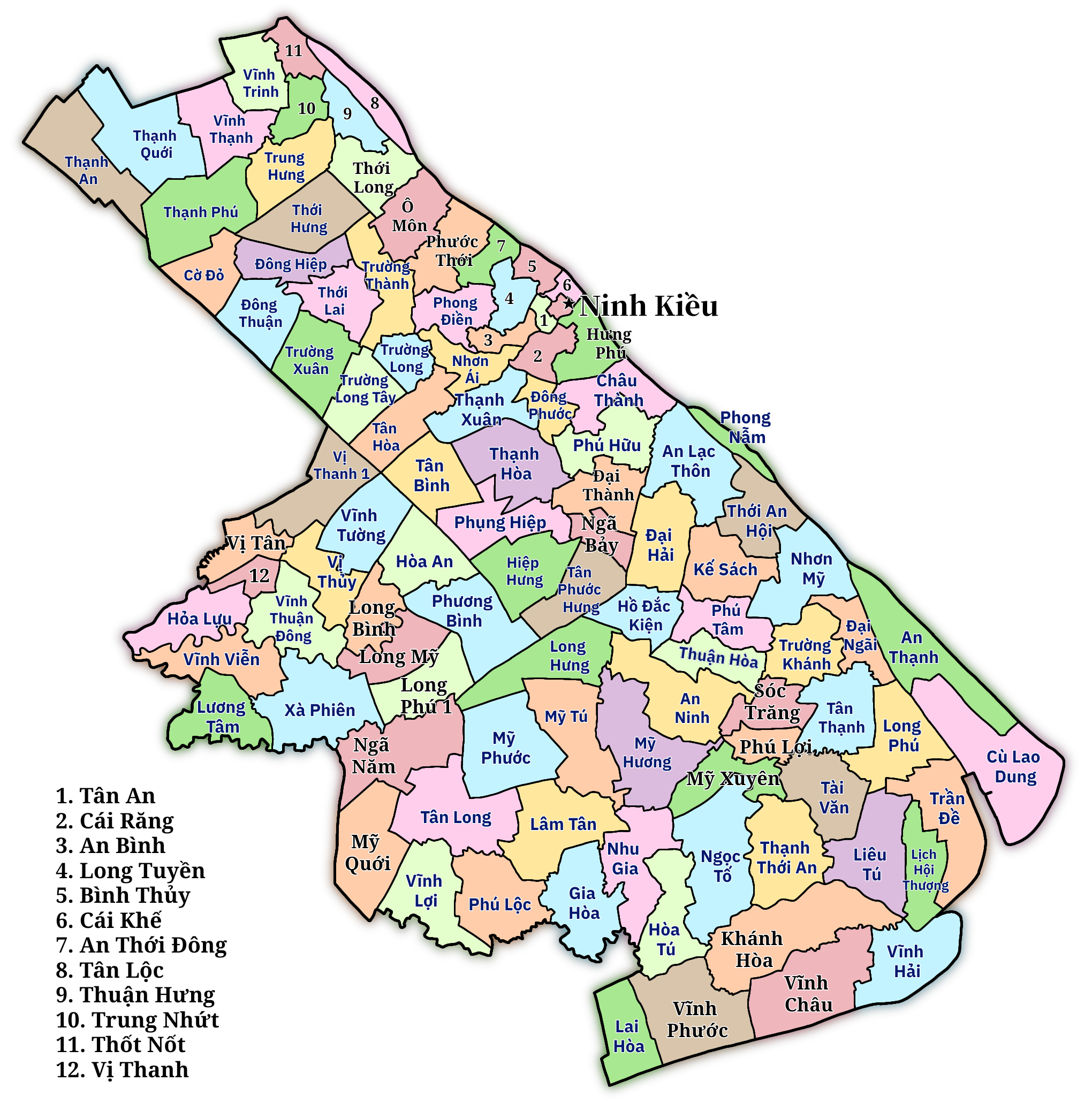
Location of Vĩnh Viễn commune on Cần Thơ municipality map.

Vĩnh Viễn commune has the following geographical location:

- To the south, it borders Lương Tâm commune and An Giang province.
- To the north, it borders Hỏa Lựu commune and Vĩnh Thuận Đông commune.
- To the east, it borders Xà Phiên commune.

== History ==
Prior to 2025, Vĩnh Viễn commune was formerly Vĩnh Viễn commune-level town and Vĩnh Viễn A commune in Long Mỹ district, Hậu Giang province.

On June 12, 2025, the National Assembly of Vietnam issued Resolution No. 202/2025/QH15 on the reorganization of provincial-level administrative units. Accordingly:

- Cần Thơ city was established by merging the entire area and population of Cần Thơ city, Hậu Giang province, and Sóc Trăng province.

On June 16, 2025, the Standing Committee of the National Assembly of Vietnam issued Resolution No. 1668/NQ-UBTVQH15 on the reorganization of commune-level administrative units in Cần Thơ city. Accordingly:

- Vĩnh Viễn commune was established by merging the entire area and population of Vĩnh Viễn commune-level town and Vĩnh Viễn A commune (formerly part of Long Mỹ district).
