= Vị Thủy =

Coordinates: 9°45′46″N 105°31′59″E

- Commune
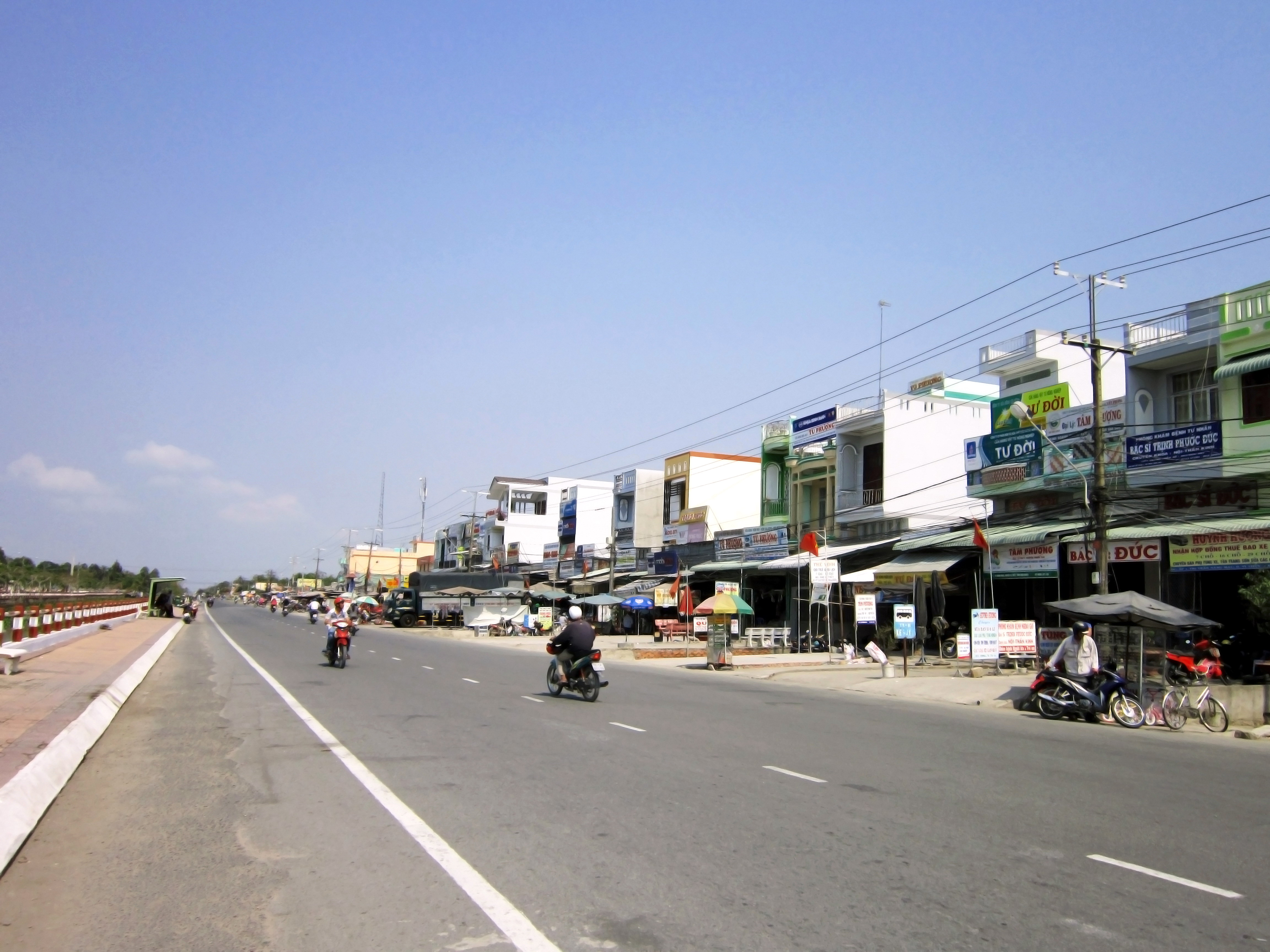
- National Route 61 in Vị Thủy commune.
- Interactive map of Vị Thủy
- Country: Vietnam
- Municipality: Cần Thơ
- Establish: June 16, 2025

Area
  - Total: 49.84 km^{2} (19.24 sq mi)

Population (2025)
  - Total: 32,394 people
  - Density: 650.0/km^{2} (1,683/sq mi)
- Time zone: UTC+07:00

Vị Thủy is a commune in Cần Thơ municipality, Vietnam. It is one of 103 communes and wards in the municipality after following the 2025 reorganization.

== Geography ==
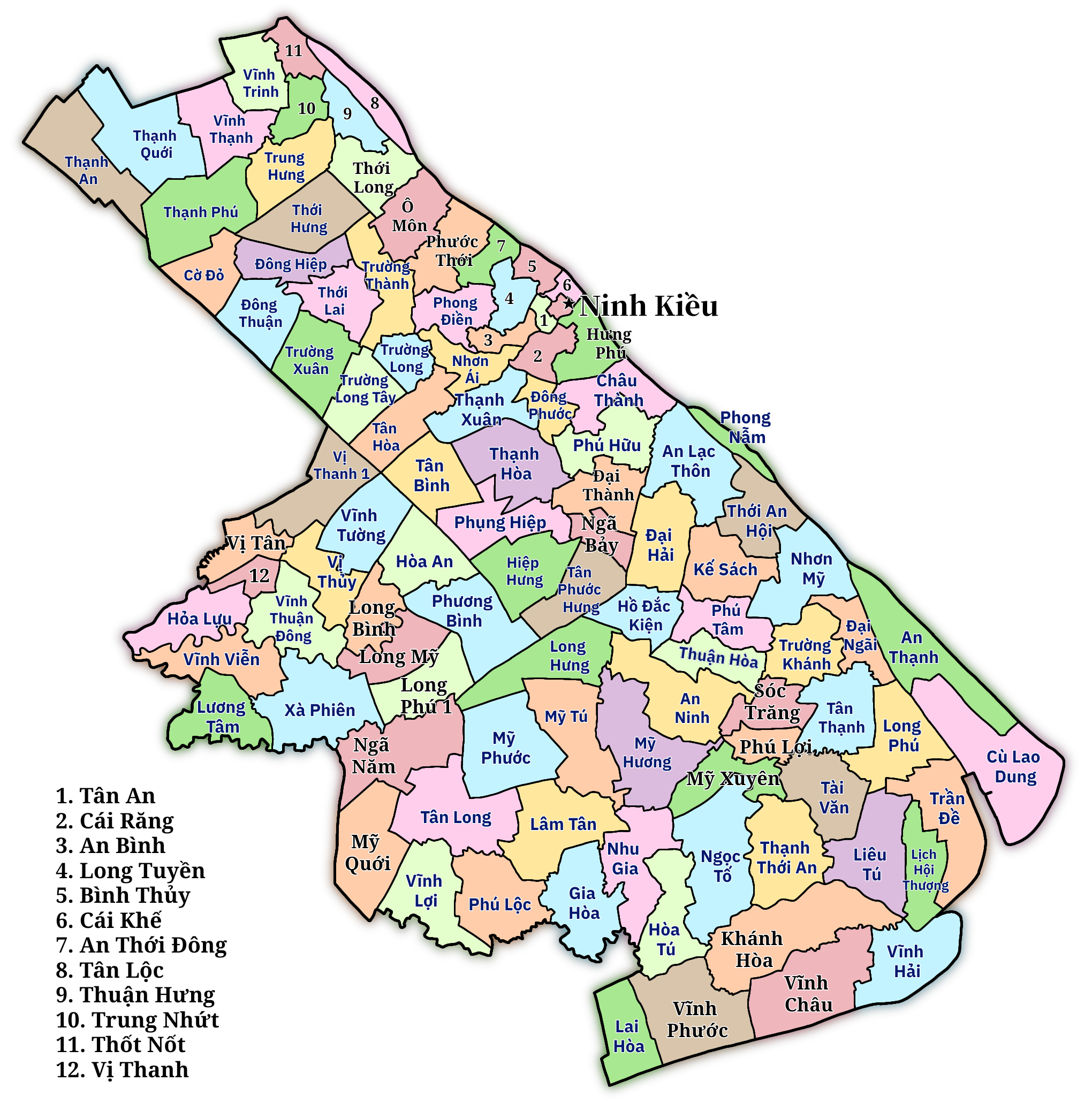
Location of Vị Thủy commune on Cần Thơ municipality map.

Vị Thủy commune has the following geographical location:

- To the east, it borders Long Bình ward.
- To the south, it borders Vĩnh Thuận Đông commune.
- To the west, it borders Vị Tân ward.
- To the north, it borders Vĩnh Tường commune and Vị Thanh 1 commune.

== History ==
Prior to 2025, Vị Thủy commune was formerly Nàng Mau commune-level town and Vị Thắng and Vị Trung communes in Vị Thủy district of Hậu Giang province.

On June 12, 2025, the National Assembly of Vietnam issued Resolution No. 202/2025/QH15 on the reorganization of provincial-level administrative units. Accordingly:

- Cần Thơ municipality was established by merging the entire area and population of Cần Thơ municipality, Hậu Giang province, and Sóc Trăng province.

On June 16, 2025, the Standing Committee of the National Assembly of Vietnam issued Resolution No. 1668/NQ-UBTVQH15 on the reorganization of commune-level administrative units in Cần Thơ municipality. Accordingly:

- Vị Thủy commune was established by merging the entire area and population of Nàng Mau commune-level town, Vị Thắng commune, and Vị Trung commune (formerly part of Vị Thủy district).
