= Long Mỹ =

Ward in Cần Thơ city, Vietnam

- Ward
- 30/4 street in Long Mỹ
- Interactive map of Long Mỹ
- Country: Vietnam
- Region: Mekong Delta
- Centrally- governed city: Cần Thơ
- Established: June 16, 2025

Government
  - Type: Ward
  - Body: People's Council of Long Mỹ ward

Area
  - Total: 51.40 km^{2} (19.85 sq mi)

Population (2025)
  - Total: 35,865 people
  - Density: 697.8/km^{2} (1,807/sq mi)
- Time zone: UTC+07:00

Long Mỹ is a ward in Cần Thơ city, Vietnam. It is one of 103 wards and communes in the city following the 2025 reorganization.

== Geography ==
Location of Long Mỹ ward on Cần Thơ city map.

Long Mỹ ward has the following geographical location:

- To the southwest it borders Xà Phiên commune.
- To the southeast, it borders Long Phú 1 ward.
- To the northeast, it borders Phương Bình commune.
- To the north, it borders Long Bình ward.
- To the west, it borders Vĩnh Thuận Đông commune.

== History ==
Prior to 2025, Long Mỹ ward was formerly Thuận An ward, Long Trị commune, Long Trị A commune, Long Mỹ district-level town, Hậu Giang province.

On June 12, 2025, the National Assembly of Vietnam issued Resolution No. 202/2025/QH15 on the reorganization of provincial-level administrative units. Cần Thơ city was established by merging the entire area and population of Cần Thơ city, Hậu Giang and Sóc Trăng provinces.

On June 16, 2025, the Standing Committee of the National Assembly of Vietnam issued Resolution No. 1668/NQ-UBTVQH15 on the reorganization of commune-level administrative units in Cần Thơ city. Long Mỹ ward was established by merging the entire area and population of Thuận An ward, Long Trị commune, and Long Trị A commune (formerly part of Long Mỹ district-level town).
