= Long Mỹ district =

Coordinates: 9.667°N 105.583°E

Long Mỹ district Huyện Long Mỹ
- District
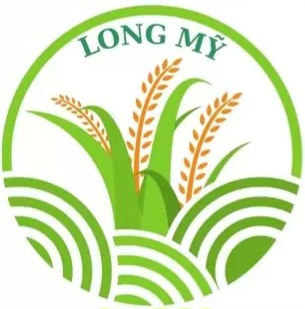
- Seal

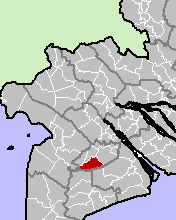
- Location in Hậu Giang province
- Country: Vietnam
- Region: Mekong Delta
- Province: Hậu Giang
- Capital: Vĩnh Viễn

Area
  - Total: 100.36 sq mi (259.92 km^{2})

Population (2019)
  - Total: 84,089
- Time zone: UTC+7 (Indochina Time)

Long Mỹ is a rural district of Hậu Giang province in the Mekong Delta region of Vietnam. As of 2019 the district had a population of 84,089. The district covers an area of 259.92 km^{2}. The district capital lies at Vĩnh Viễn town.

On May 14, 2015, the townships of Long Mỹ, Trà Lồng and the communes of Long Bình, Long Phú, Long Trị, Long Trị A and Tân Phú were separated from the district to form the new district-level town of Long Mỹ.

== Divisions ==
The district is divided into 1 township and 7 rural communes, including:

- Vĩnh Viễn township
- Vĩnh Viễn A
- Xà Phiên
- Lương Tâm
- Lương Nghĩa
- Vĩnh Thuận Đông
- Thuận Hòa
- Thuận Hưng
