= Vị Thanh (city) =

- Provincial city (Class-3)
- Vị Thanh City; Thành phố Vị Thanh
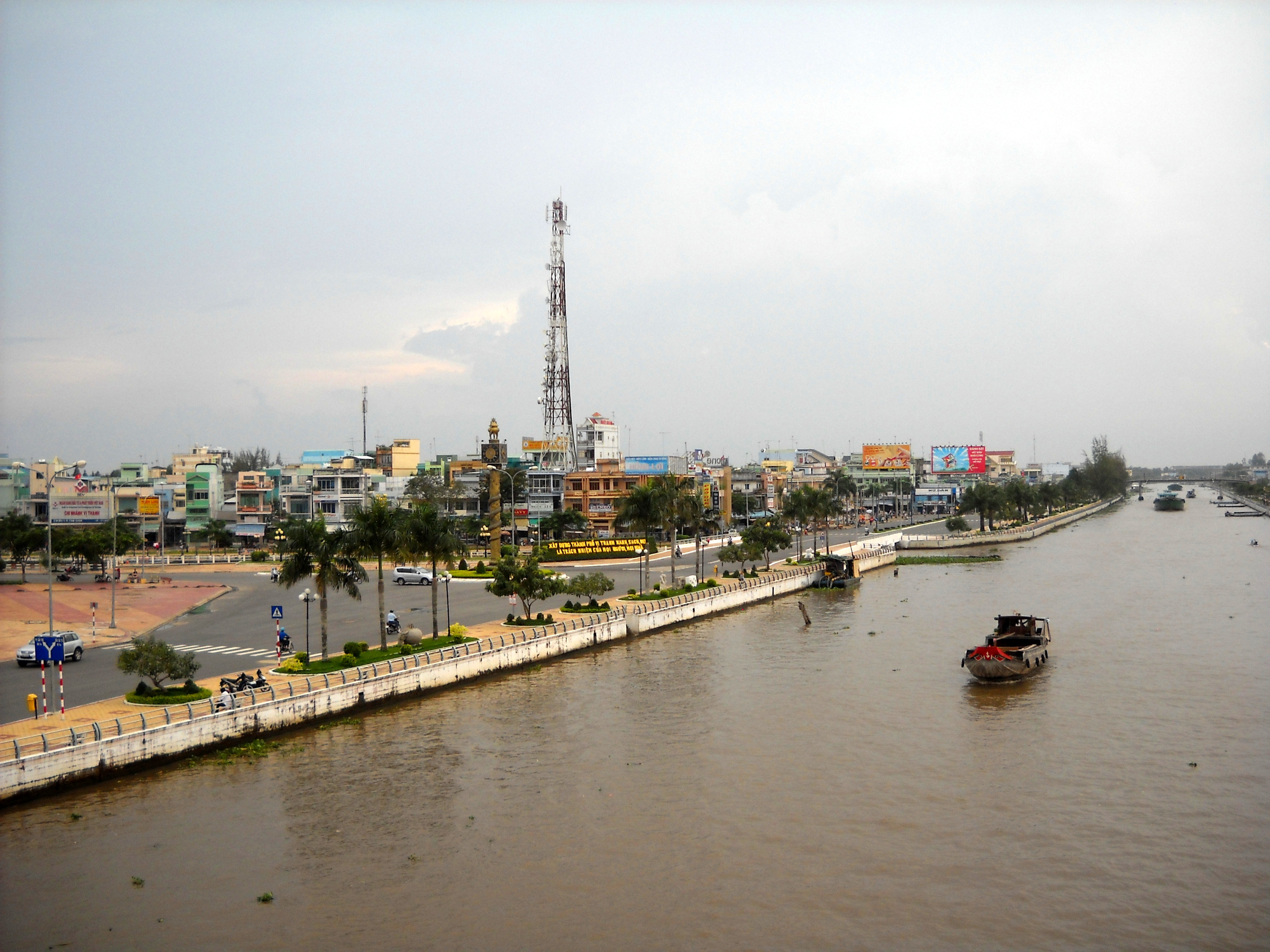
- Vị Thanh downtown
- Nickname: Hậu River East City
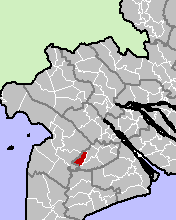
- Location in Hậu Giang Province

- Location of Vị Thanh in Vietnam
- Coordinates: 9°47′N 105°28′E
- Country: Vietnam
- Established: July 1, 1999: established Vị Thanh town; September 23, 2010: established Vị Thanh city

Government
  - Chairman of People's Committee: Huỳnh Thanh Phong
  - Chairman of the People's Council: Trần Quốc Khởi
  - Secretary: Nguyễn Hữu Tình

Area
  - Provincial city (Class-3): 118.86 km^{2} (45.89 sq mi)

Population (2015)
  - Provincial city (Class-3): 104,244
  - Density: 672/km^{2} (1,740/sq mi)
  - Urban: 50,844 (68%)
- Website: vithanh.haugiang.gov.vn

Vị Thanh is a provincial city and also the capital city of the former Hậu Giang Province in Vietnam, now merged with Can Tho. Formerly, it was the capital town of Chương-Thiện province in South Vietnam. In 2004, Vị Thanh became the capital of Hậu Giang Province. It has an industrial zone of 880,000 square metres (217 acres). There are roads, National Highway 61 (which leads to National Road 1 which leads to Cần Thơ Municipality on the Hậu River which leads to Ho Chi Minh City), and water connections by canal and river to the Hậu River.

Vị Thanh is the second biggest city of Hậu Giang, after Ngã Bảy became a city in 2020.

== Population ==
Vị Thanh city has an area of 118.67 km^{2} (45.82 sq mi), the population as of April 1, 2019, is 73,322 people, of which: the urban population is 44,164 people (60%), rural population is 29,158 people (40%), population density reaches 618 people/km^{2}.

Commune-level administrative unit	Ward I	Ward III	Ward IV	Ward V	Ward VII	Hỏa Lựu Commune	Hỏa Tiến Commune	Tân Tiến Commune	Vị Tân Commune
Acreage (km²)	0,75	13,55	7,97	7,91	6,21	17,39	23,81	21,95	22,97
Population	5.628	10.703	12.754	7.270	7.809	6.862	4.263	7.060	11.027
Population density	8.602 km²	792 km²	1.633 km²	905 km²	1.289 km²	433 km²	212 km²	396 km²	487 km²
Number of administrative units	4 areas	6 areas	7 areas	5 areas	5 areas	6 hamlets	5 hamlets	6 hamlets	9 hamlets
Founded year	1999	1999	1999	1999	2003	1991	1979	2006	1978
Source: Commune-level population in Vị Thanh city in 2019

== Gallery ==
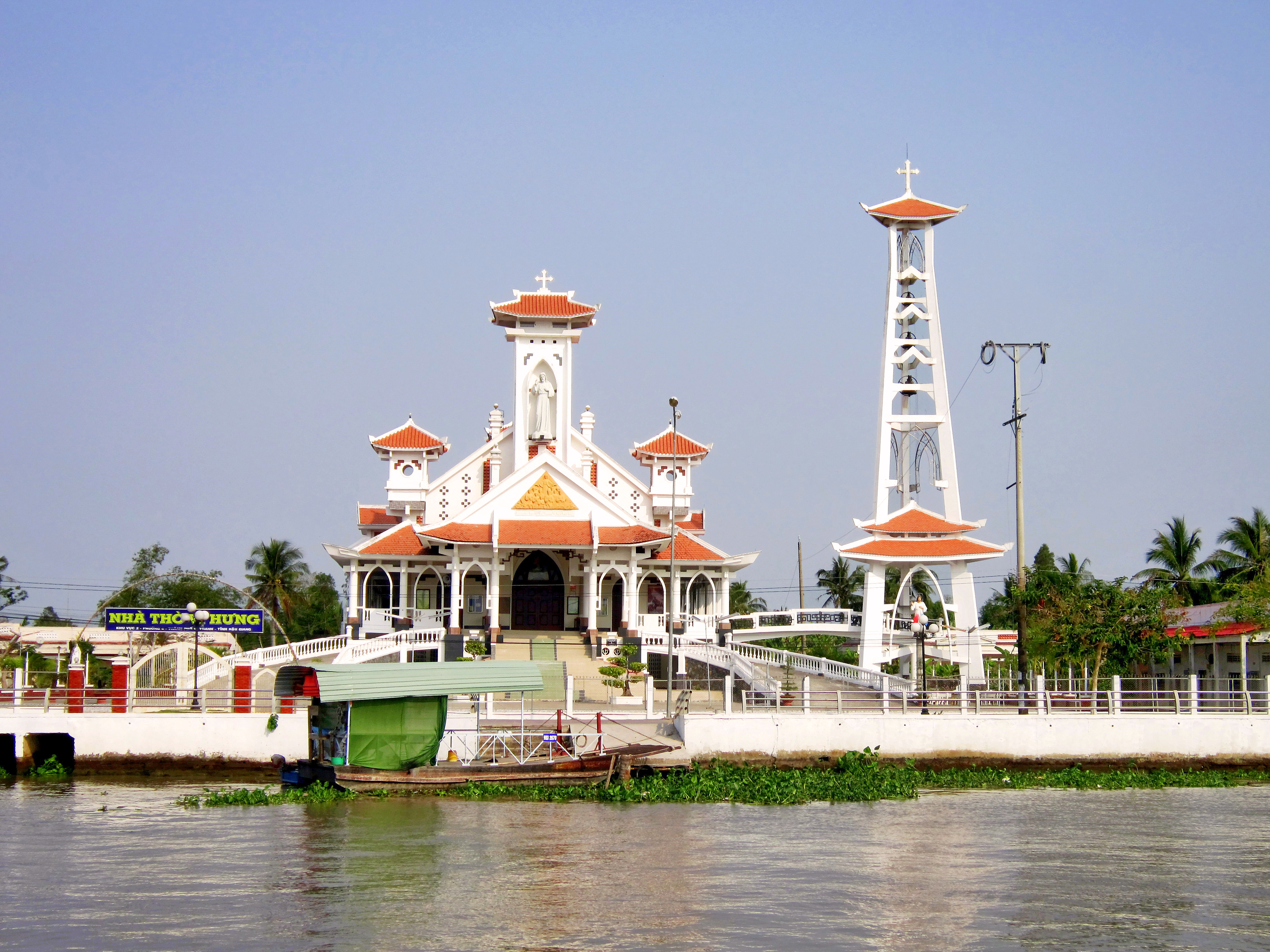
Vị Hưng Church next to Xà No River in Vị Thanh city.
