= Long Mỹ (town) =

Coordinates: 9°40′53″N 105°34′15″E

- District-level town (Class-4)
- Long Mỹ Town; Thị xã Long Mỹ
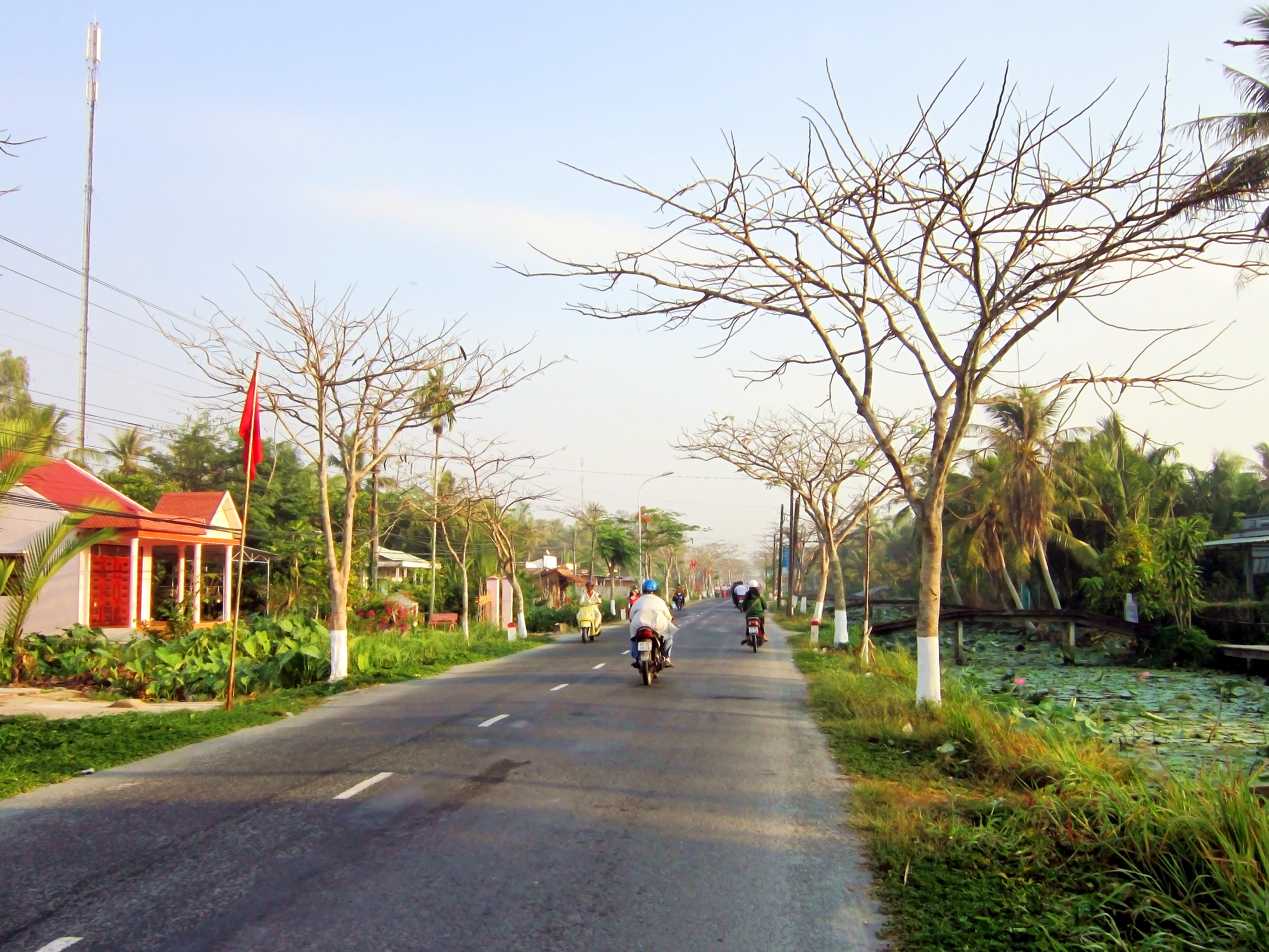
- Interactive map of Long Mỹ
- Country: Vietnam
- Region: Mekong Delta
- Province: Hậu Giang
- Established: 2016

Area
  - Total: 57.64 sq mi (149.29 km^{2})

Population (2016)
  - Total: 71,963
  - Density: 1,250/sq mi (482/km^{2})
- Time zone: UTC+7 (Indochina Time)
- Website: thixalongmy.haugiang.gov.vn

Long Mỹ is a district-level town (thị xã) in the Mekong Delta of Vietnam. Until May 2015 it was a part of Long Mỹ District.
