= Hậu Giang province =

Former province of Vietnam

Hậu Giang
- Province
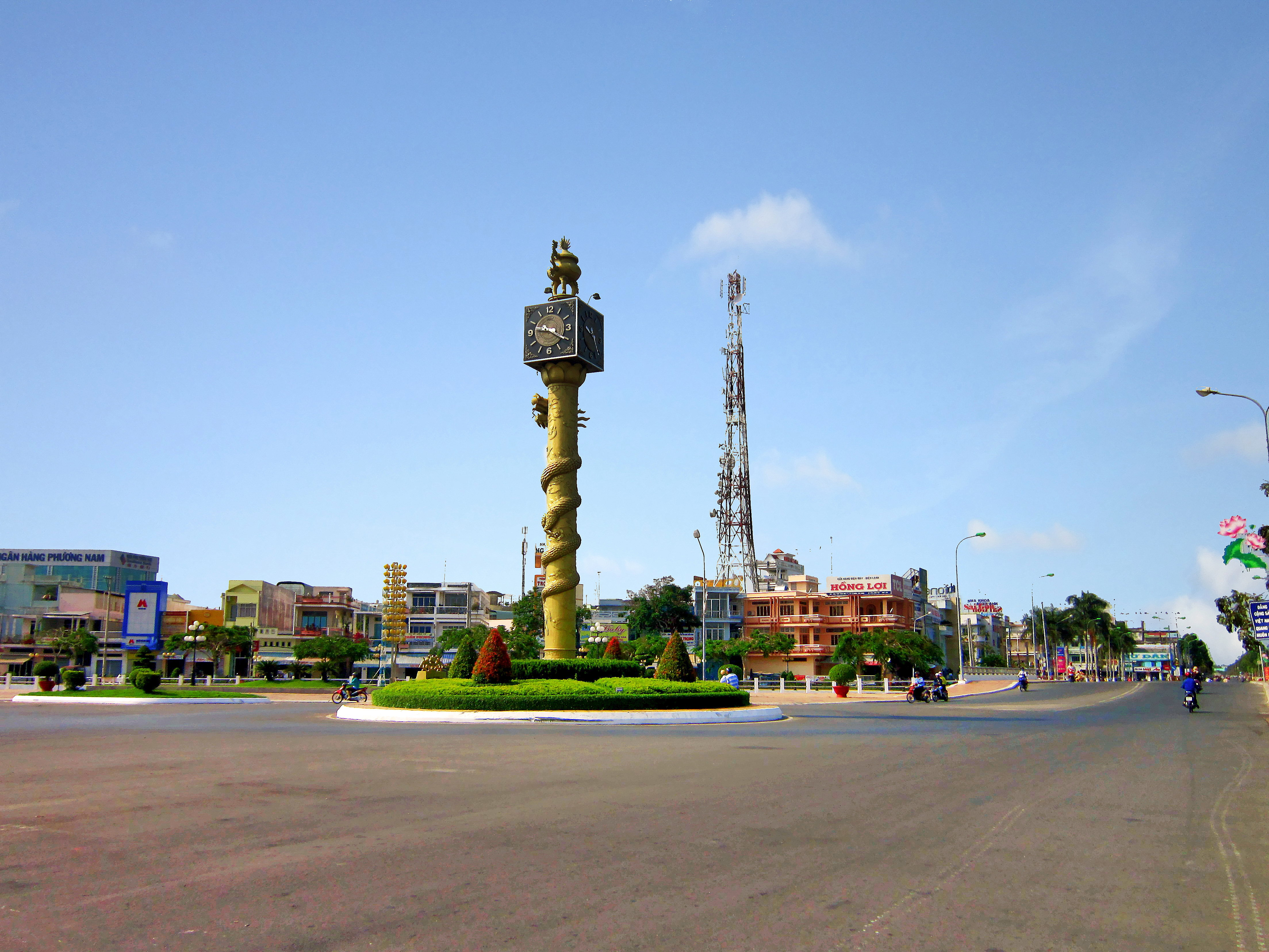
- Asia Clock Tower in the centre of Vị Thanh city

- Seal

- Location of Hậu Giang in Vietnam
- Coordinates: 9°47′N 105°28′E
- Country: Vietnam
- Region: Mekong Delta
- Capital: Vị Thanh

Government
  - People's Council Chair: Trần Văn Huyến
  - People's Committee Chair: Đồng Văn Thanh

Area
  - Total: 1,622.23 km^{2} (626.35 sq mi)

Population (2025)
  - Total: 997,880
  - Density: 615.13/km^{2} (1,593.2/sq mi)

Demographics
  - Ethnicities: Vietnamese, Hoa, Chăm, Khmer

GDP
  - Total: VND 29.763 trillion US$ 1.293 billion
- Time zone: UTC+7 (ICT)
- Area codes: 293
- ISO 3166 code: VN-73
- HDI (2020): ▲0.693 (41th)
- Website: www.haugiang.gov.vn

Hậu Giang was a former province located in the Mekong Delta region in the southern part of Vietnam. Vị Thanh is the capital. It was dissolved and merged with Cần Thơ on 12 June 2025.

== History ==
Former seal

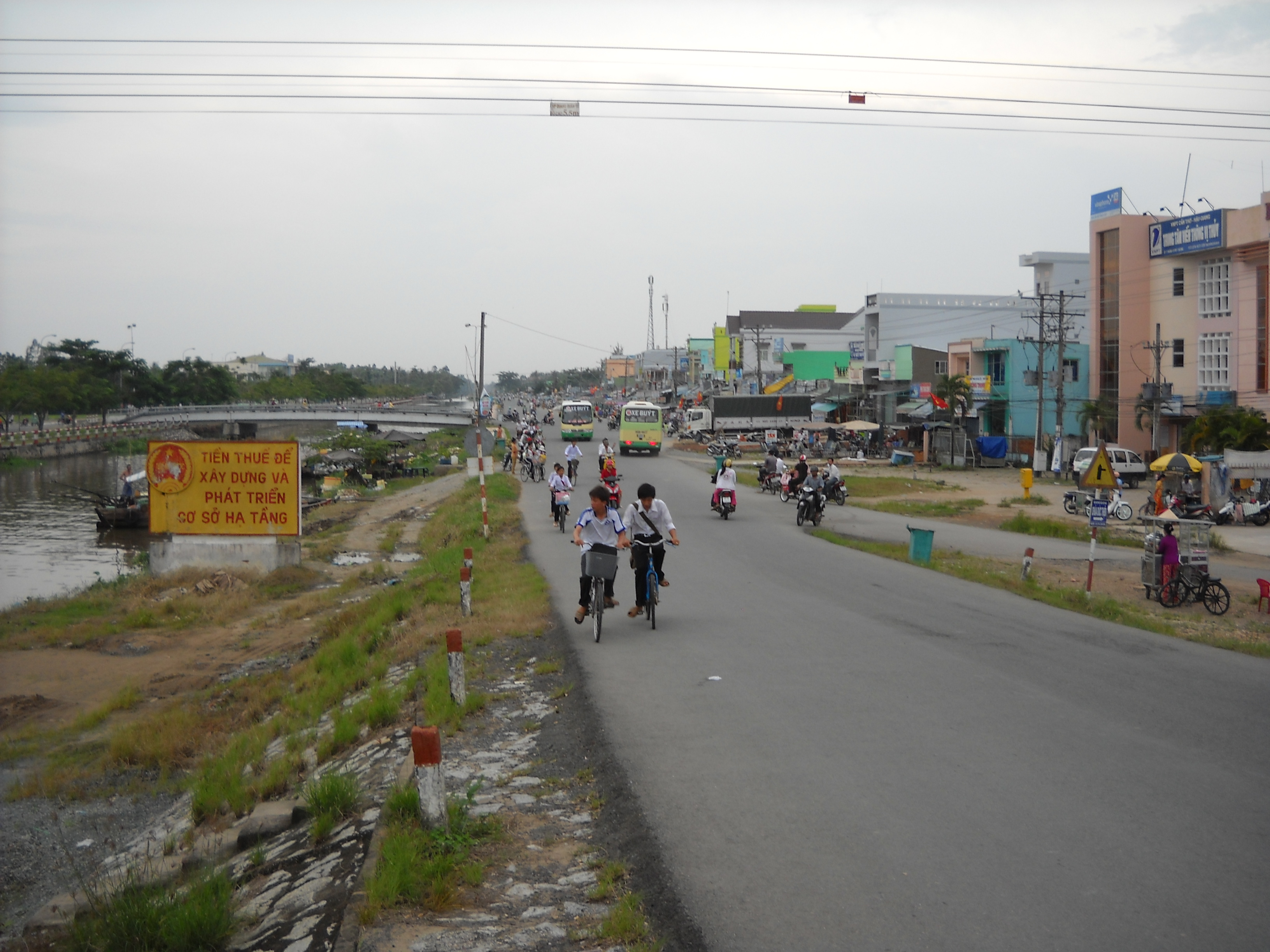
Nàng Mau town, Vị Thủy district

Until the collapse of the South Vietnam in 1975, the province included the city of Cần Thơ which was the provincial capital. In 1975, the province was renamed Cần Thơ province, with the city of Cần Thơ still the capital. In late 2004, Cần Thơ and some surrounding cities became Cần Thơ municipality (Thành Phố Cần Thơ). The remainder of Cần Thơ province became Hậu Giang province.

Hậu Giang has an industrial zone of 902 ha. There are 120 km of national roads: National Highway 61 (which leads to National Highway 1, going through Cần Thơ Municipality on the Hậu River to Ho Chi Minh City), and water connections by canal and river to the Hậu River.

An estimated 80% of the province will be underwater following a 0.5-metre (1 ft 8 in) sea level rise relative to the current land elevation, which is subsiding over time.

== Administrative divisions ==
Hậu Giang is subdivided into eight district-level sub-divisions:

- 5 districts:
  - Châu Thành
  - Châu Thành A
  - Long Mỹ
  - Phụng Hiệp
  - Vị Thủy
- 1 district-level town:
  - Long Mỹ
- 2 provincial cities:
  - Vị Thanh (capital)
  - Ngã Bảy

They are further subdivided into 11 commune-level towns (or townships), 51 communes, and 13 wards.

== Gallery ==
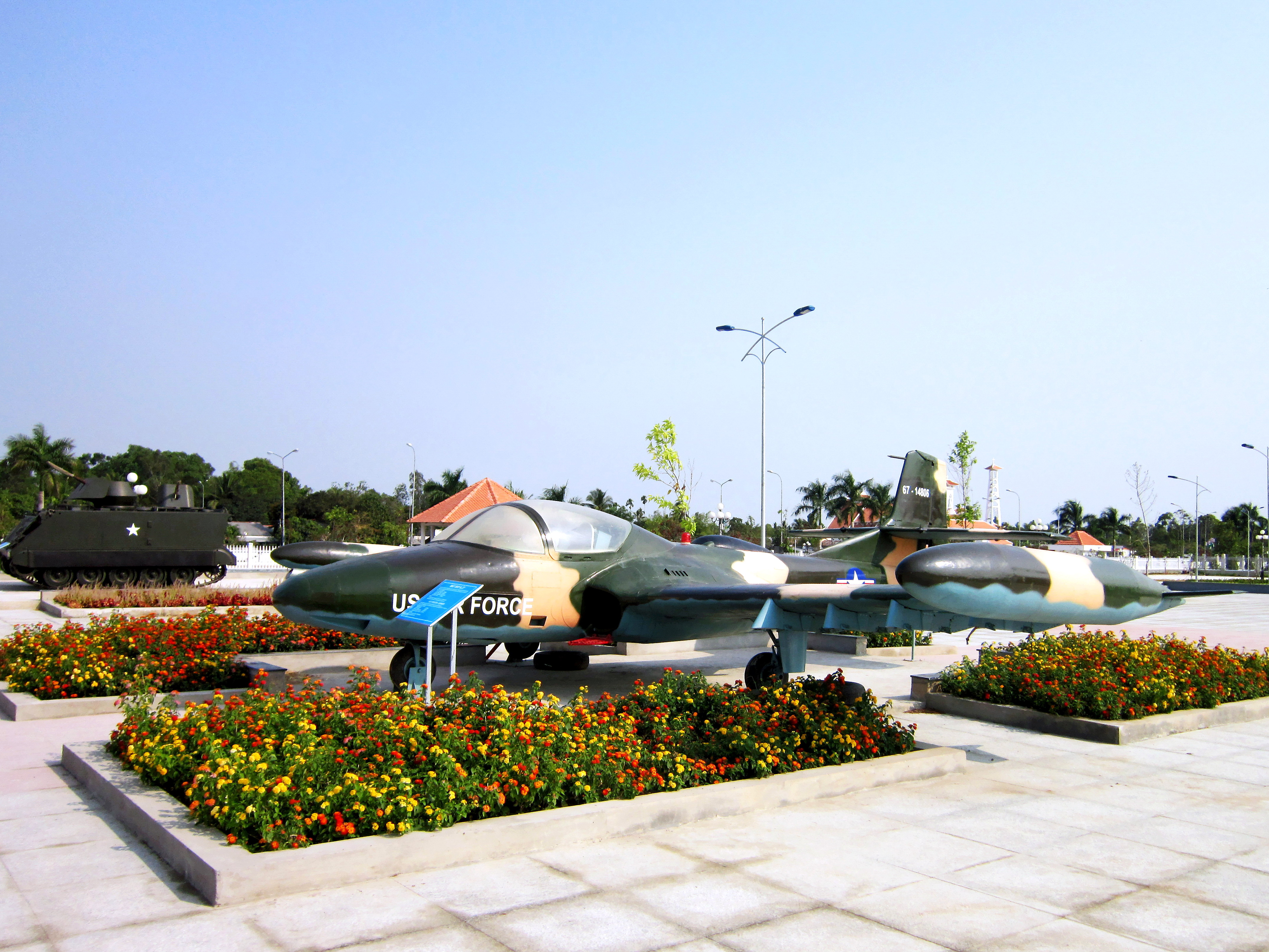
In the Chương Thiện Victory Monument in Ward 5, Vi Thanh city.

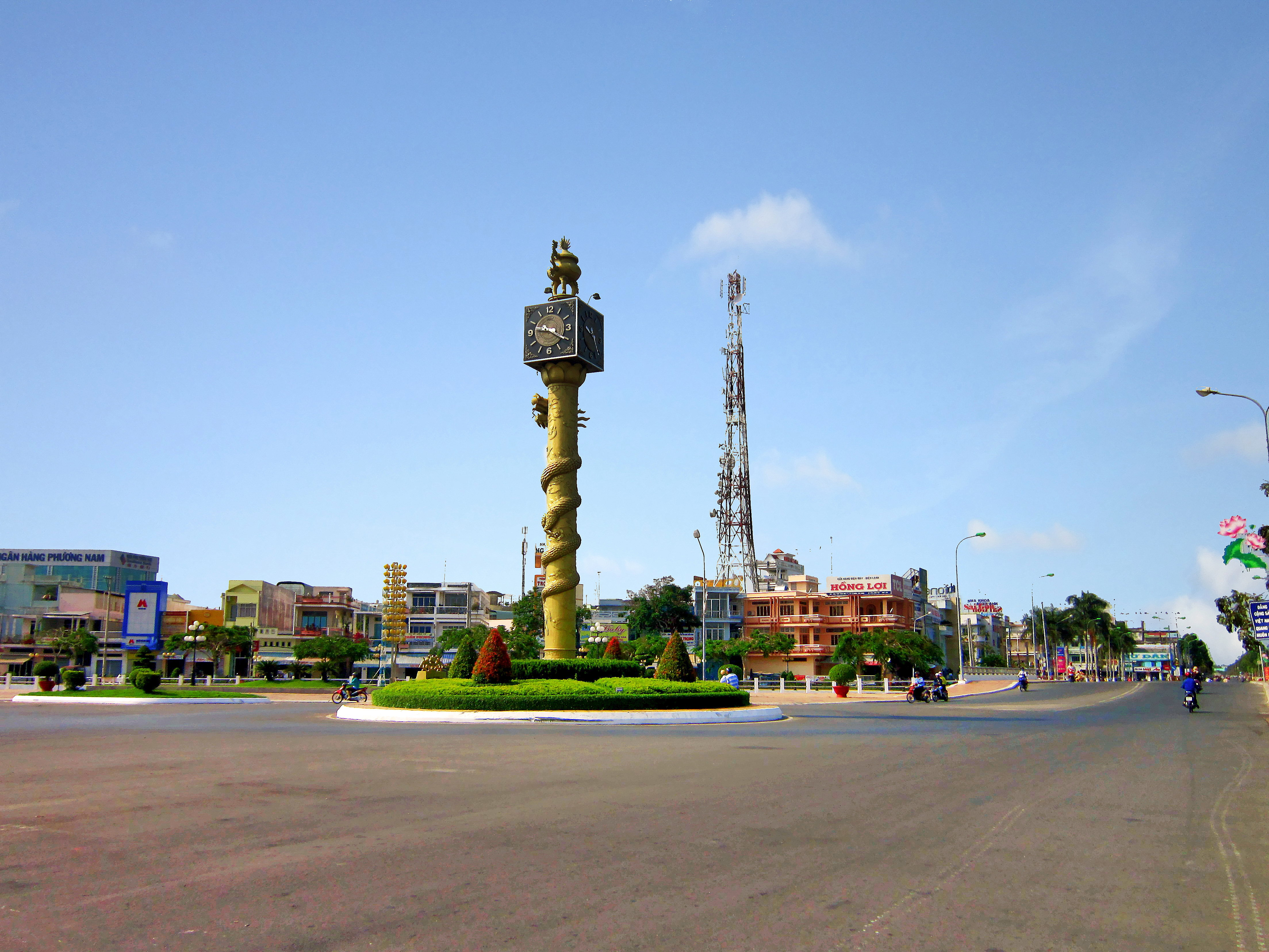
Clock Tower in the center of Vị Thanh City.

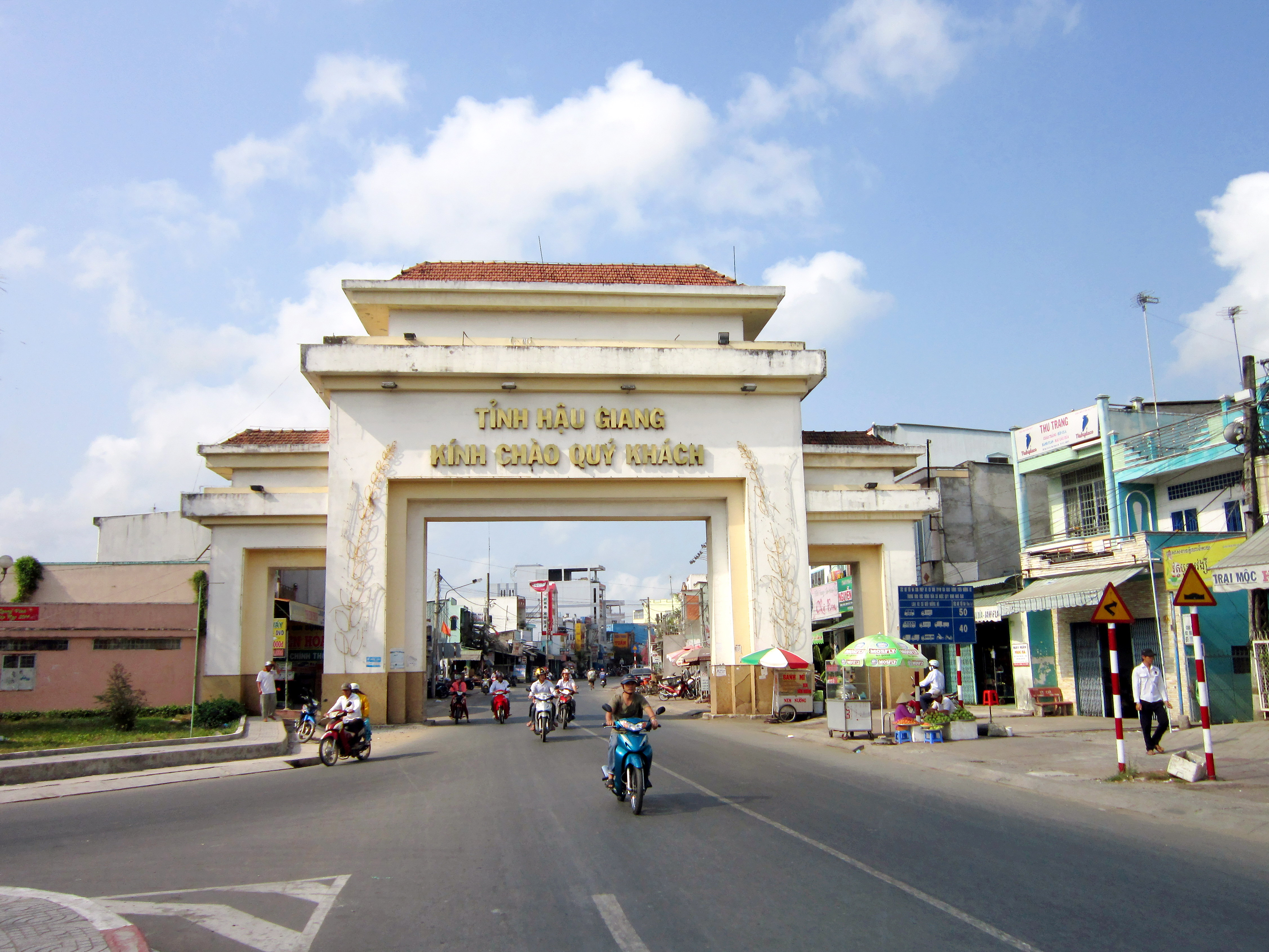
The welcome gate of Hậu Giang province, located in the town of Cái Tắc.

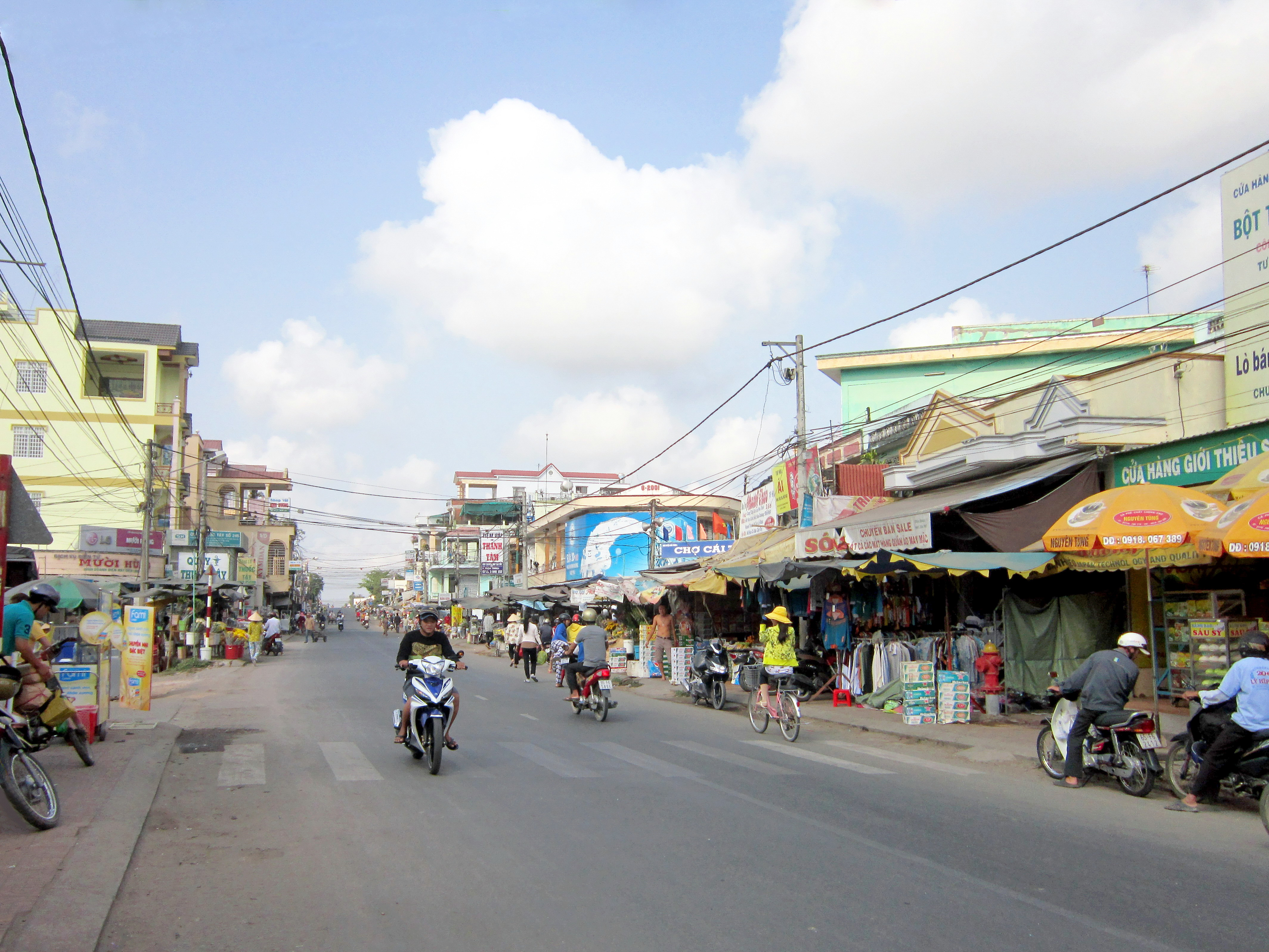
On National Highway 61, the section passing Cái Tắc town market.

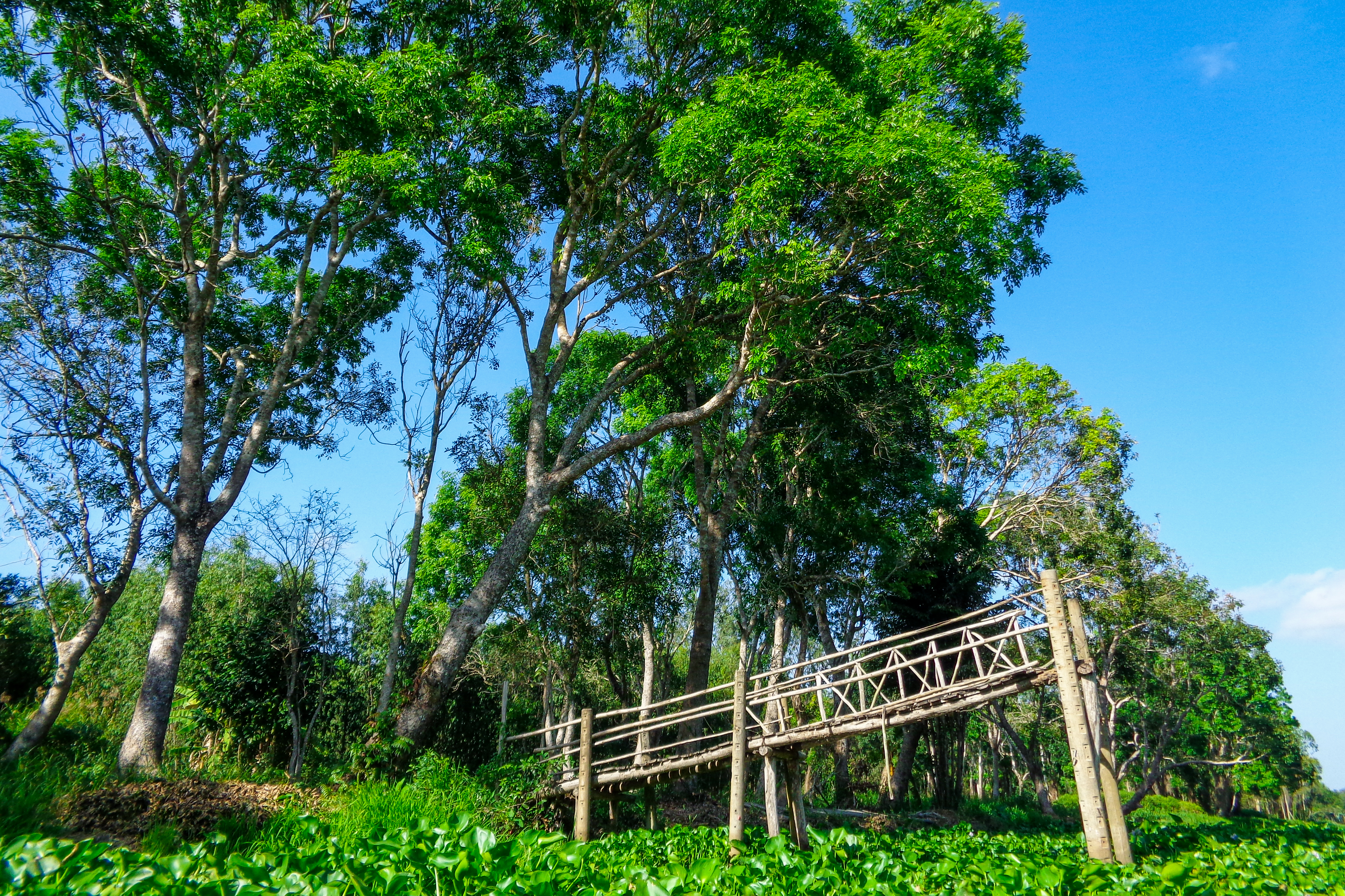
Lung Ngoc Hoang Nature Reserve
