= Tịnh Xá Trung Tâm =

Vietnamese Buddhist temple

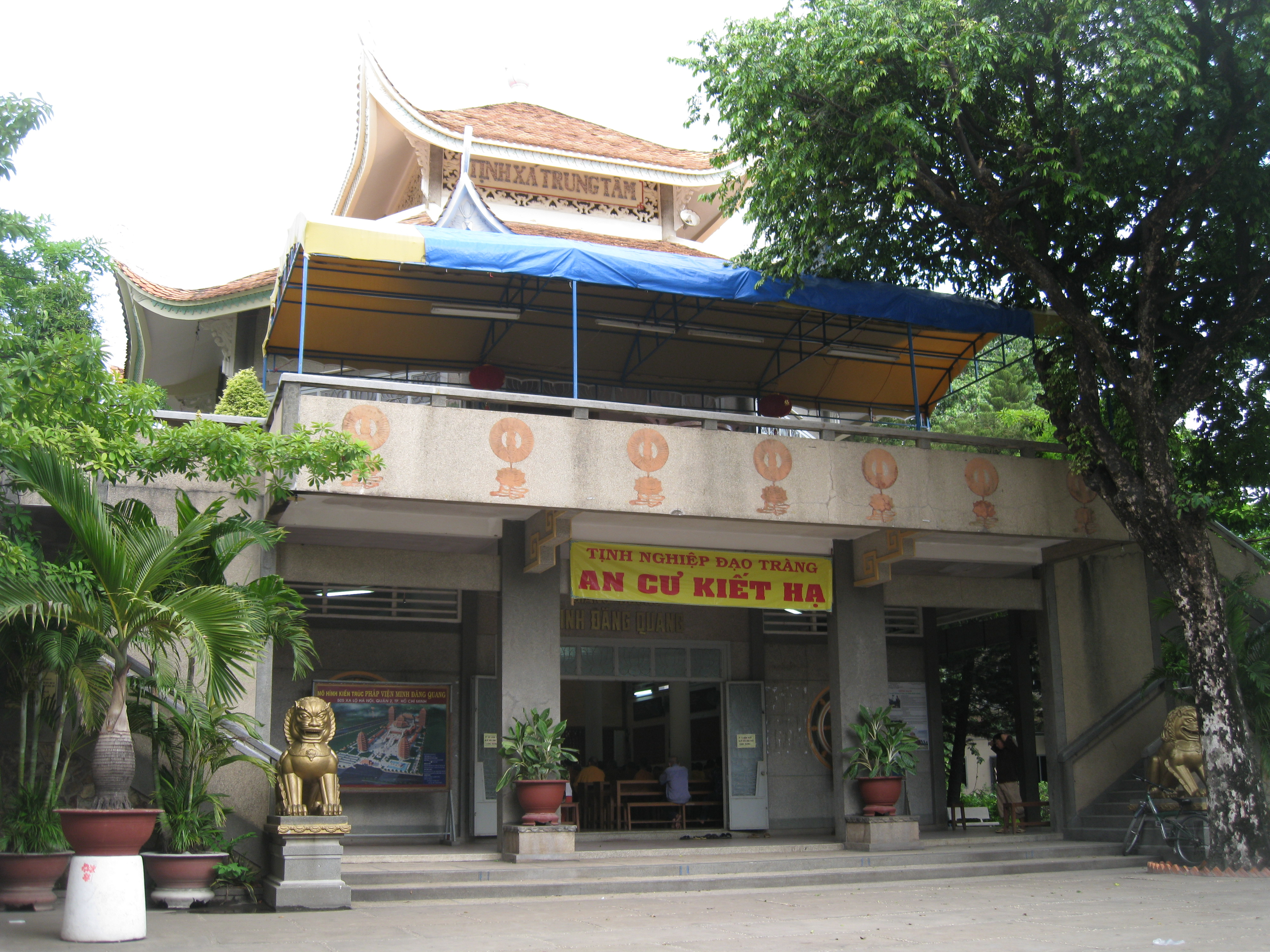
The main ceremonial hall of Tịnh Xá Trung Tâm.

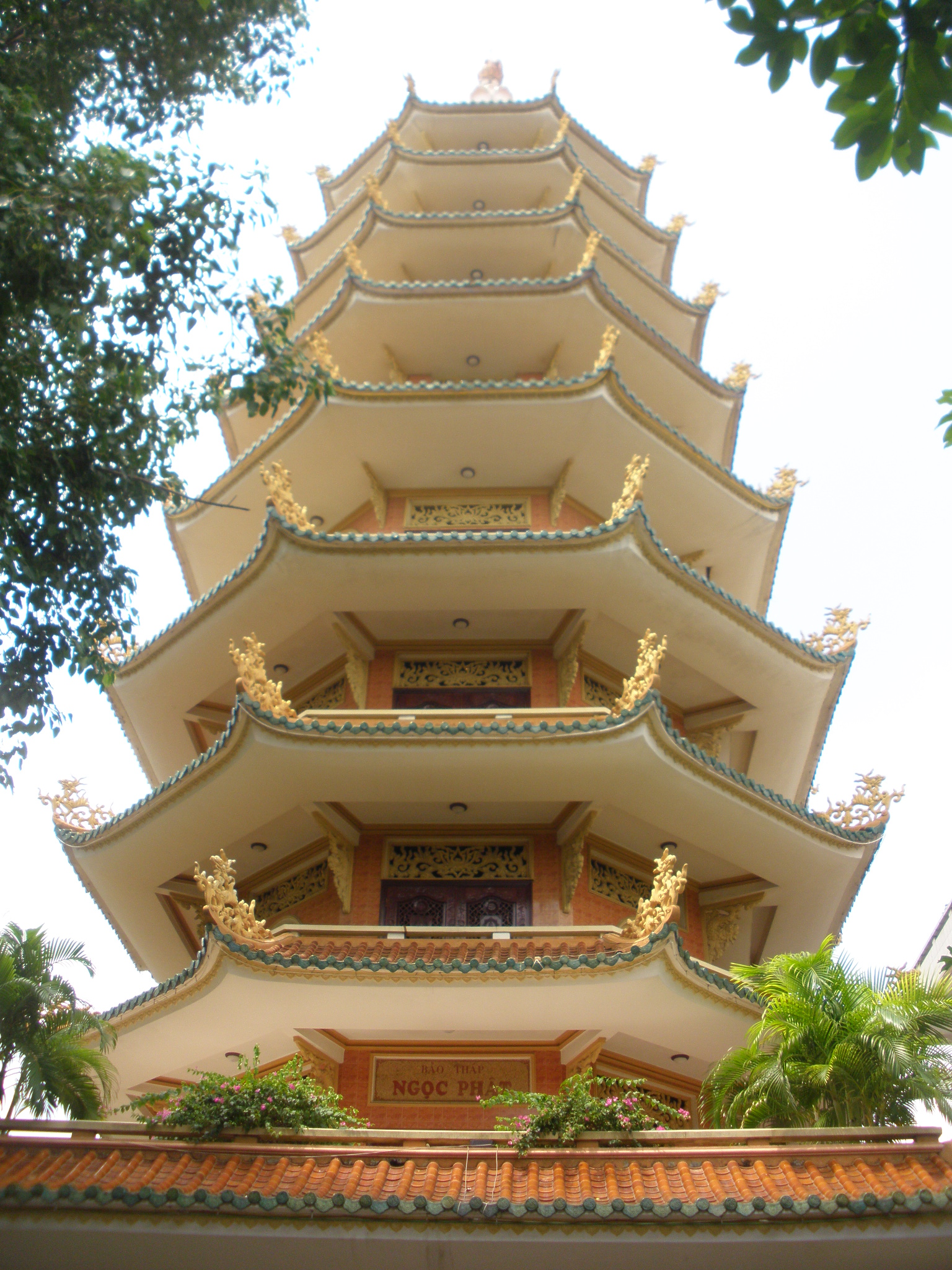
Tịnh Xá Trung Tâm Pagoda.

Tịnh Xá Trung Tâm is a Buddhist temple in Ho Chi Minh City, the largest city in Vietnam. It was founded in 1965 and is the spiritual birthplace of the khất sĩ tradition of Vietnamese Buddhism that attempts to recreate the original tradition of the Buddhist sangha by walking barefoot and begging for alms. The temple is located at 7 Nguyễn Trung Trực Street, in Bình Thạnh District. It is known for its weekly Bát Quan Trai Giới (Eight Precept Ritual) retreat, which is staged more frequently than at other institutions in the city, and has a reputation among its followers for rigour and discipline. The attendees of the temple are typically over 40 years of age and are overwhelmingly female.

The temple is set on a plot of 5,490 square metres (59,100 sq ft), and construction took ten years. Initially, the complex comprised two halls, two compounds for the sangha other buildings. The temple was the headquarters of the Vietnamese khất sĩ Sangha Association until 1980. In 1998, an octagonal nine-story tower, named the Buddha Gem Tower, was built. The tower is lit at night and is visible throughout the surrounding area. The bottom four floors form the library as well as the repository for some relics of Gautama Buddha. Many of the inner walls of the halls of the temple are adorned with relief carvings and paintings depicting important events in the life of Buddha. In the courtyard stands a statue of Avalokiteshvara bodhisattva.

== History ==
The founding patriarch of the khất sĩ tradition was Thích Minh Đăng Quang, who was born Nguyễn Thành Đạt in 1923 to a peasant family from the village of Phú Hậu, Bình Phú prefecture, Tam Bình District in Vĩnh Long Province in the Mekong Delta. He founded the tradition in 1944 with the vow "Nối truyền Thích-ca chánh pháp Đạo Phật Khất sĩ Việt Nam" (Transmitting the correct dharma of Sakyamuni, Khất sĩ Buddhism of Vietnam), which came to be the motto of the khất sĩ tradition. Although he disappeared in 1954, his followers continued to expand and went on to open Tinh Xa Trung Tam.

== Buildings and development ==
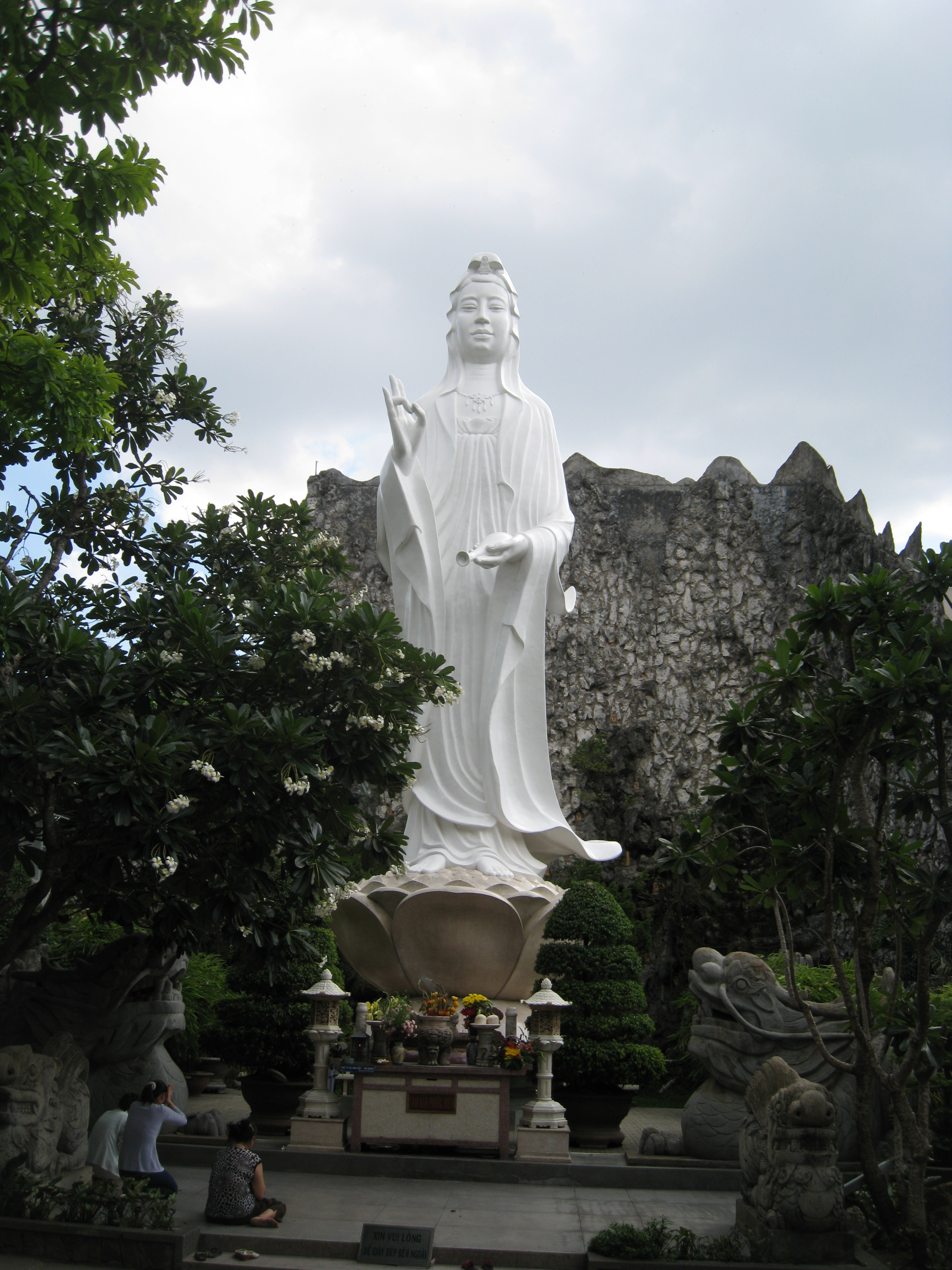
Statue of Avalokiteshvara

The temple is set on a plot of 5,490 square metres (59,100 sq ft); construction of the building began in April 1965 and took ten years. The plot of land was donated by a Buddhist layperson named Nguyễn Văn Chà. Initially, the complex comprised a main ceremonial hall, a patriarch hall, two compounds for the sangha and a set of huts for solitary religious practice. The temple was the headquarters of the khất sĩ Sangha Association from 1966 until 1980.

In November 1980, the abbot Thích Giác Toàn along with Thích Giác Phúc organised an expansion that involved the erection of a two-storied compound that included the main ceremonial hall. The compound was built in an octagonal shape, as planned by the architect Nguyễn Hữu Thiện. The tower part of the compound is 4.40 metres (14.4 ft) tall, with octagonal sides of length 2.25 metres (7.4 ft). At the top of the temple are 13 miniature levels, which represent the 13 realms of existence. The tower was constructed from wood, with lotuses depicted on the exterior walls. There are 12 paintings that depict various events in the life of Gautama Buddha, including the birth at Lumbini, the enlightenment at Bodh Gaya, the first dharma talk at Deer Park in Varanasi and the entering of nirvana at Kushinagar. Further parts of the wall display quotes from the Dhammapada written in Vietnamese. The entire artwork on and within the tower was the work of Thiện Ngộ and his group of artists from the Art School of Long An. The artwork was created between 1982 and 1984. The main lecture hall on the ground floor has wooden benches and can house several hundred people. A large statue of the patriarch Thich Minh Dang Quang stands at the front of the hall, in front of the wall paintings and a table on a platform where the speaking monk sit while giving a dharma talk.

The centrepiece of the main ceremonial hall on the second level is a statue of Gautama Buddha in the Buddha Hall. It is carved from wood, is 6 metres (20 ft) tall, and is enclosed in a glass case. Also on this level is a ceramic statue depicting the birth of Prince Siddhartha. It depicts the traditional account of the prince taking seven steps, which resulted in seven lotuses blooming spontaneously, followed by Siddhartha pointing to the sky with his index finger and declaring that this life would be his last in samsara. On the internal wall of the temple are eight murals of the life of Gautama Buddha by Minh Dung and Hai Long. They are 2 metres (6.6 ft) high and carved into the wall.

There are two other chambers on the second floor. Behind the Buddha Hall is the patriarch's alcove. The founder of any Vietnamese monastery is typically commemorated there, but in this case, Thích Minh Đăng Quang left no remains, so only his begging bowl and robe are present, protected by a glass enclosure. The bowl is smaller than usual and the robe is of a saffron-dark orange colour. Buddhists often prostrate before the two objects, although as the glass enclosure and the Buddha statues in the main hall lie on the central symmetry axis of the building, they do so at an angle so that their posteriors are not pointing towards the statue of the Buddha. Behind the patriarch's alcove is another chamber, the centre of which is a statue of the bodhisattva Ksitigarbha. Instead of being depicted with the typical staff with six rings around it —representing the six realms of existence—Ksitigarbha is shown with a "wish-granting gem". To either side of Ksitigarbha are photos of deceased monks and nuns. To the extreme left and right are photographs and names of deceased lay Buddhists, and their ashes are stored in urns below the altar.

In the front courtyard of the temple is a statue Avalokiteshvara bodhisattva, which stands 9 metres (30 ft), on a lotus seat 3 metres (9.8 ft) high. This is unusually high for an Avalokiteshvara statue in an outdoor courtyard. Before 1975, the khất sĩ Sangha Association had around 300 temples in southern Vietnam, and the temple was the headquarters of the organization.

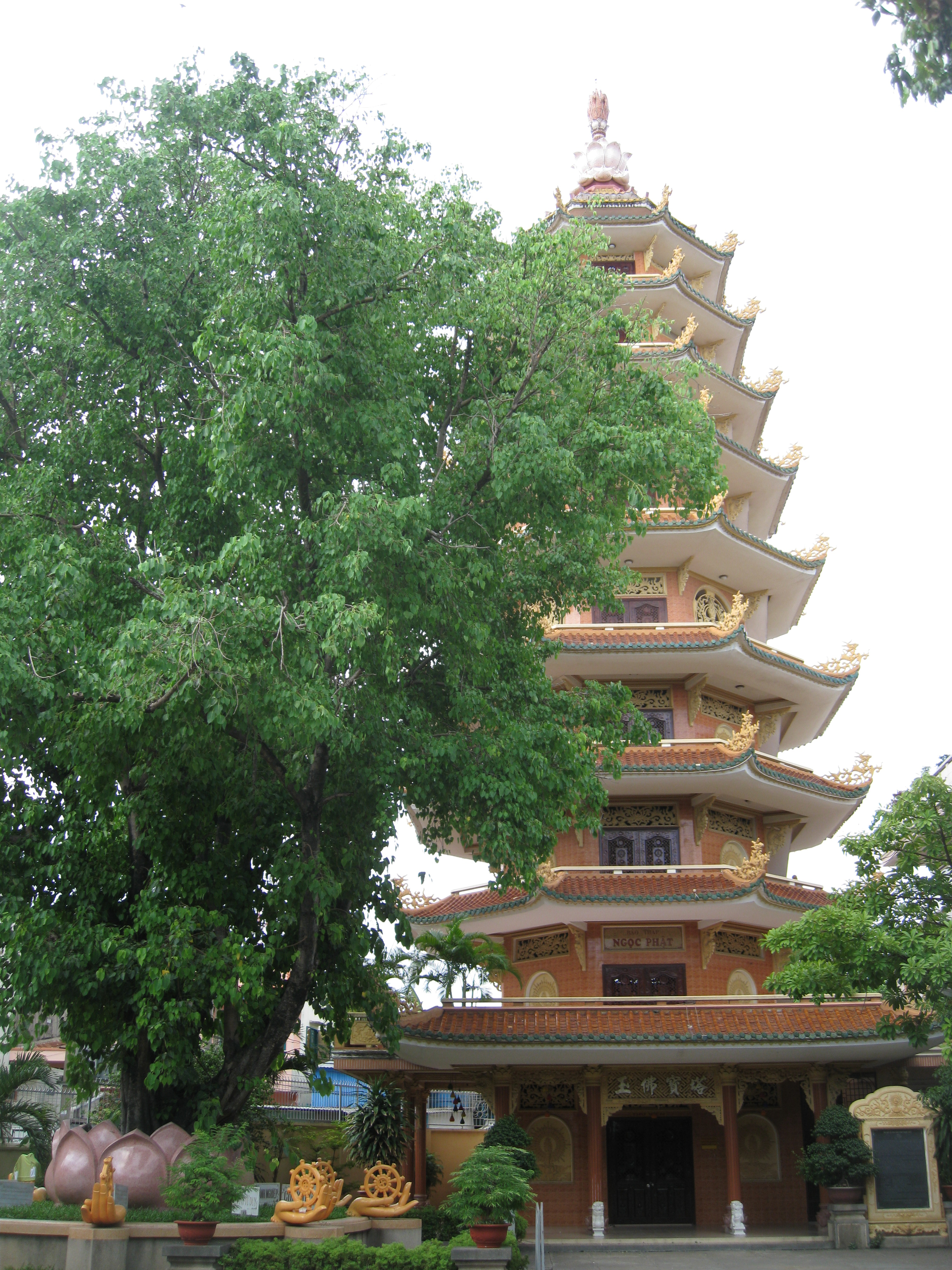
The Buddha Gem Tower

In 1998, an octagonal nine-story tower, named the Buddha Gem Tower, was built next to the Bodhi tree. It is 37 metres (121 ft) high and has a symbolic Torch of Wisdom at the top, which is lit at night and is visible throughout the surrounding area. The bottom four floors form the library as well as the repository for some of the Buddha's relics. The top five levels are used to enshrine the ashes of monks and nuns.

To the left of the gate is the bookstore, which is run by the lay disciples of the temple. Unlike many other Buddhist institutions, the publications are generally not free. The outlet offers journals published by the government-run Buddhist media, as well as material written by Vietnamese monks, translations of canonical texts, works by internationally renowned Buddhist scholars, and audiovisual recordings of dharma talks by Vietnamese monks. It also sells images and statues of Gautama and Amitabha Buddha, and Avalokiteshvara. Next to the bookstore is the medical clinic, Tue Tinh Duong (Tue Tinh Hall), named after a Trần Dynasty monk and herbal medicine practitioner who was famed for attending to the impoverished and compiling the first known book on Vietnamese herbal medicine. As is the case with medical clinics named in Tue Tinh's honour, the services dispensed are complimentary. The outlet at Tinh Xa Trung Tam is the mendicant sect's most active medical facility.

The Triple Gate (Tam Quan) is accessible by both pedestrians and vehicles. Two-wheeled vehicles and pedestrians use the left and right wings respectively, and cars, buses, and trucks can use the central wing. The three gates represent emptiness, impermanence and middle-view. It is decorated with sculptures and engravings of lotuses, lanterns and swastikas, all prominent symbols in Buddhism. On the left hand side of the grounds, there is a Bodhi tree, a symbol of the enlightenment of the Buddha. The tree is located in a concrete lotus, and around it are eight samsara-wheel-shaped signs that represent the Noble Eightfold Path. Signs with text explain each of the eight paths.

Aside from the two tower complexes, there is a reception office, administrative block, monastic quarters, meditation halls and a kitchen complex where lay supporters prepare meals for the monks and visitors. The monastic quarters and meditation hall are not open to laypeople and can provide accommodation for hundreds of monks. This large capacity is often utilised during the Rains Retreat. This retreat commemorates events during the life of the Buddha, when the rainy season came between the full moons of the fourth and seventh lunar months. As a result, monks of the time stayed in one place to practice rather than travel from place to place.

== Intrusions ==
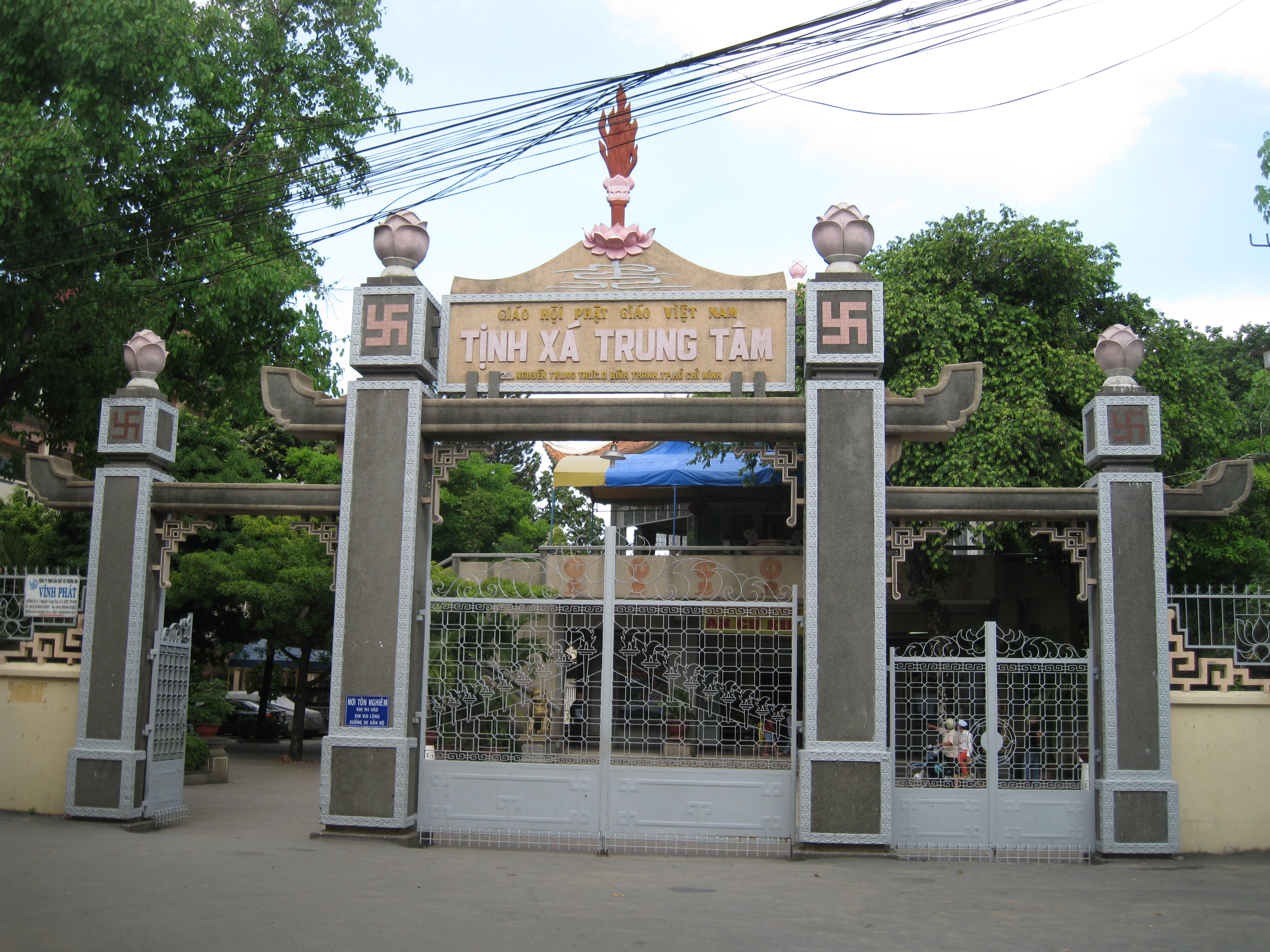
The Triple Gate of Tinh Xa Trung Tam

As with other Buddhist temples in Ho Chi Minh City, rapid urban sprawl in the city has enveloped Tinh Xa Trung Tam and disturbed the serenity that existed when it was first constructed. The area surrounding Tinh Xa Trung Tam is now a noisy neighborhood, and most prominent among the sources of disturbances is a karaoke bar located on an alley leading to the temple. Due to overcrowding in the neighbourhood, joggers often use the monastery grounds, so a sign has been erected indicating "Ladies and gentlemen exercisers please follow this route" so that they circle the Dharma Tower in a clockwise direction, a path usually taken by Buddhists around stupas as an act of devotion.

In response to the growing noise, a sign has been placed at the gate to remind visitors—Buddhists and non-Buddhists—about etiquette. It says that bicycles and motorcycles should be pushed into the yard with engines turned off. A policy of locking the halls when they are not in use has also been enacted to prevent homeless people from camping there. Some stray dogs have adopted Tịnh Xá Trung Tâm as their home and traipse about during rituals; they are fed vegetarian food. Although begging is not allowed inside the monastery grounds, it is allowed on the footpath outside the camp, and several handicapped people have made themselves a regular presence there.

== Social outreach ==
The monastery runs a fundraising program for cataract operations in the city, and receives wide support due to public suspicion of charities affiliated with the ruling Communist Party government, due to the communists' strong reputation for rampant corruption. Following the fall of Saigon and the communist takeover, religious bodies were required to be registered with and loyal to the party. The khat si complied and became one of the nine schools within the state-sanctioned Vietnamese Buddhist Congregation. However, the temple does not fly the national flag, and the only government material or symbols on display within Tịnh Xá Trung Tâm are letters of congratulations for charity initiatives.

== Demographics and activities ==
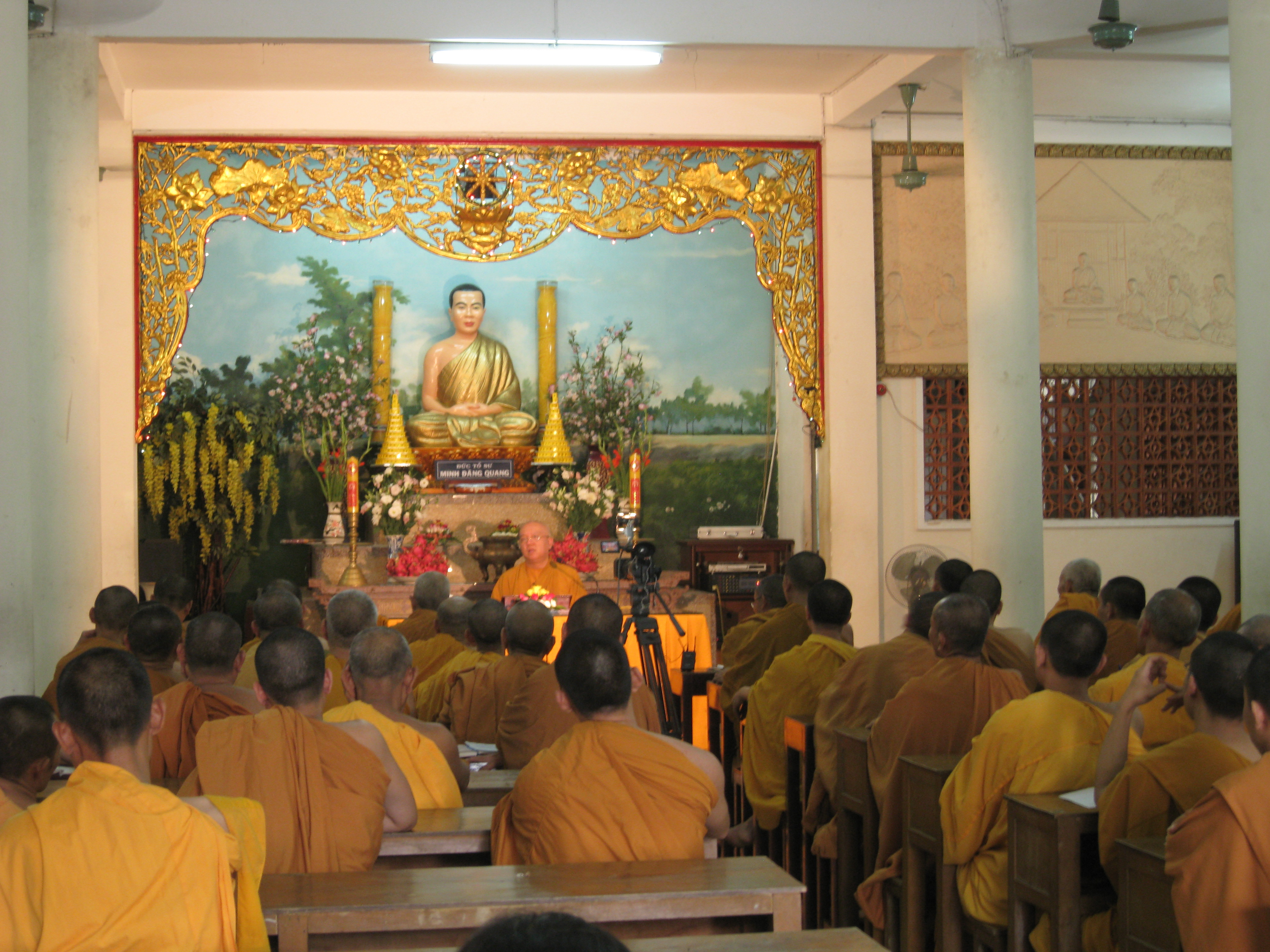
A dharma talk at Tịnh Xá Trung Tâm

The lay attendees at Tinh Xa Trung Tam are predominantly female by a ratio of around 5 to 1, and most of the temple-goers are over 40. Most of the younger lay disciples are relatives of regular, older attendees. In addition to local residents, who make up the bulk of the disciples, some are from other parts of Vietnam, as well as overseas Vietnamese who are temporarily in the country. According to the American professor of Vietnamese history and religion Mark W. McLeod, who did fieldwork at Tịnh Xá Trung Tâm, he did not survey the laypeople about their income, for fear of embarrassing them, but conjectured that most had an above average income as they were able to devote a considerable amount of time to organized religious activity instead of working longer hours. A regular occurrence at the temple is the weekly Bát Quan Trai Giới (Eight Precepts Ritual). As part of this, the participants take on three additional vows apart from the Five Precepts and stay at the temple for a 24-hour period. These vows prohibit adornments such as makeup and jewellery, the use of comfortable beds and chairs, and eating impurely. During the retreat day, meals are taken in silence and talking is avoided, apart from during dharma talks, sutra chanting and religious debate. Meditation is also a part of the routine. Tinh Xa Trung Tam holds the Eight Precepts Ritual more often than any other institution in the city; the next most frequent temple holds the retreat once every two weeks. Dharma talks are held weekly by the resident monks and nuns, which is generally more frequent than at other places in the city. The disciples and monks at the temple told McLeod that they chose Tinh Xa Trung Tam because of what they regarded as a higher level of discipline, rigor and scholarship at the institution. The monks are transported by their disciples as they are forbidden to drive.

The founder of khất sĩ had been a supporter of freeing birds as an act of compassion, and this has been continued by some monks and lay people as it is believed to be meritorious, but others have spoken out against on the grounds that the demand for birds used for such ceremonies merely prompt more people to capture them in the first place.

According to the scholar Mark McLeod, the temple incorporated aspects of both Mahayana and Theravada traditions in its style of practice and architecture. He felt that the modest and uncomplicated wooden statue of the Buddha is more reminiscent of Theravada architecture, while the Ksitigarbha and Avalokiteshvara statues are distinctly Mahayana, as these figures are absent from Theravada teachings. One monk interviewed by McLeod said that his temple's interpretation of Buddhism and its inclusiveness of Mahayana and Theravada aspects is "like a tree, which needs roots, a trunk, branches, and leaves; it cannot survive if any is missing." He added that the appropriateness of a teaching, practice, symbol, is independent of its origin, but is determined by "whether or not it accords with the Buddha's Teachings."
