= Quốc Ân Temple =

Buddhist temple in Vietnam

Coordinates: 16°26′33.74″N 107°35′14.31″E

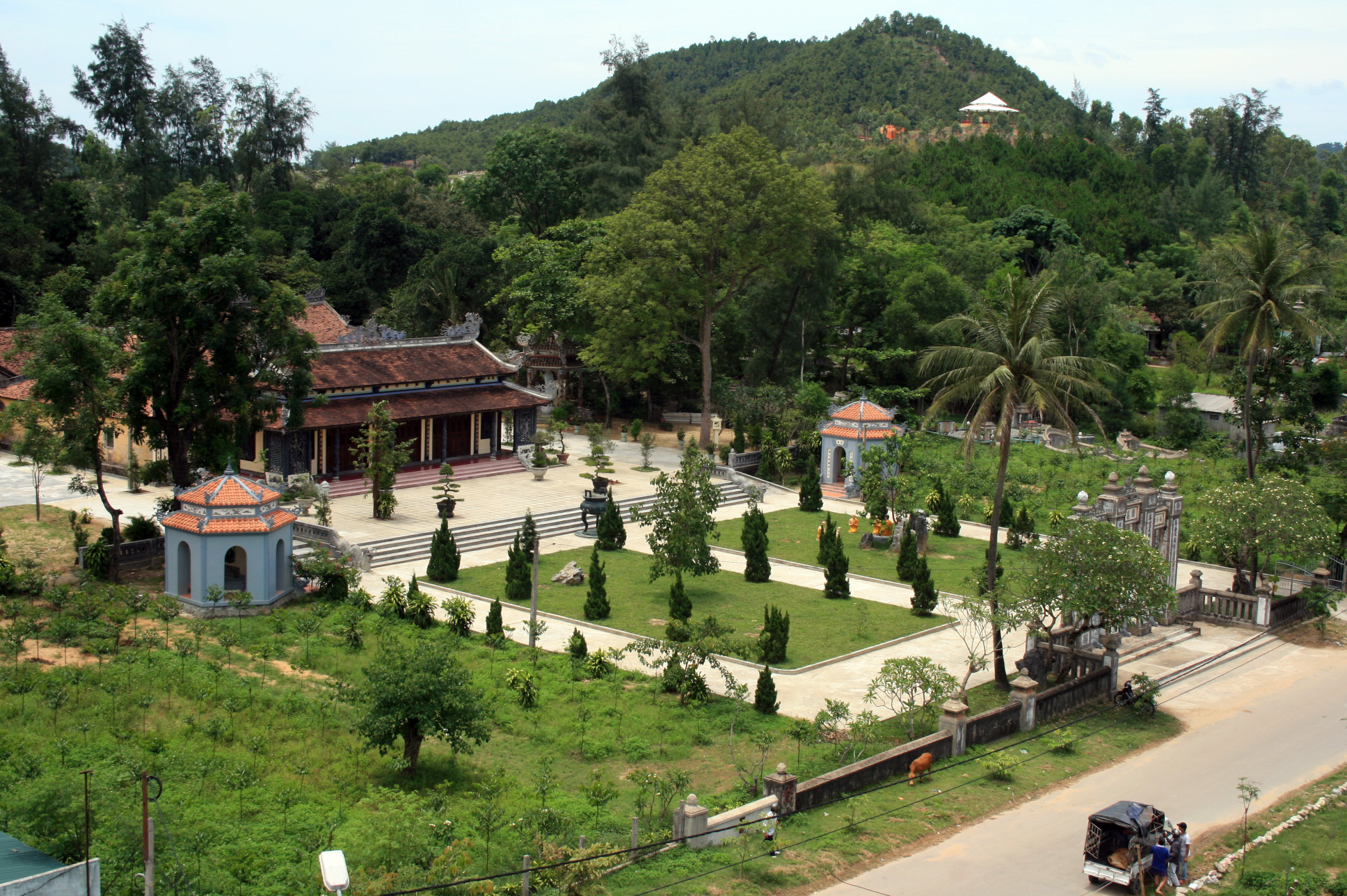

Vietnamese name
- Vietnamese alphabet: Chùa Quốc Ân
- Chữ Hán: 恩國寺
- Chữ Nôm: 񣘠恩國

Quốc Ân Temple (Chùa Quốc Ân) is a Buddhist temple in the city of Huế, central Vietnam.

In the main hall is a banner, containing a verse of praise of the temple and its founder, written by Nguyễn Phúc Chu, one of the Nguyễn lords who once ruled central and southern Vietnam and the city of Huế. The temple is situated on a small hill in the ward of Trường An in the city of Huế. It is located about 2 kilometres (1.2 mi) from the Phú Cam bridge that spans the Perfume River, which passes through Huế.

The temple was founded by Zen Master Thích Nguyên Thiều (1648–1728), between 1682 and 1685, and was known as the Vĩnh Ân Temple. Thích Nguyên Thiều was originally from China, and was a disciple of Thích Khoáng Viên, from Guangdong in southern China. In 1677, he immigrated to southern Vietnam by boat, to settle in territory ruled by the Nguyễn lords. He had initially arrived in Bình Định further south, founding the Chùa Thập Tháp Di-đà (Vietnamese for Temple of the Ten Towers of Amitabha). After building his first temple, he travelled the region expounding the dharma, before travelling to Huế to found the Hà Trung Temple in Vinh Hà district before moving to the Ngự Bình mountain district to build the Vĩnh Ân Temple.

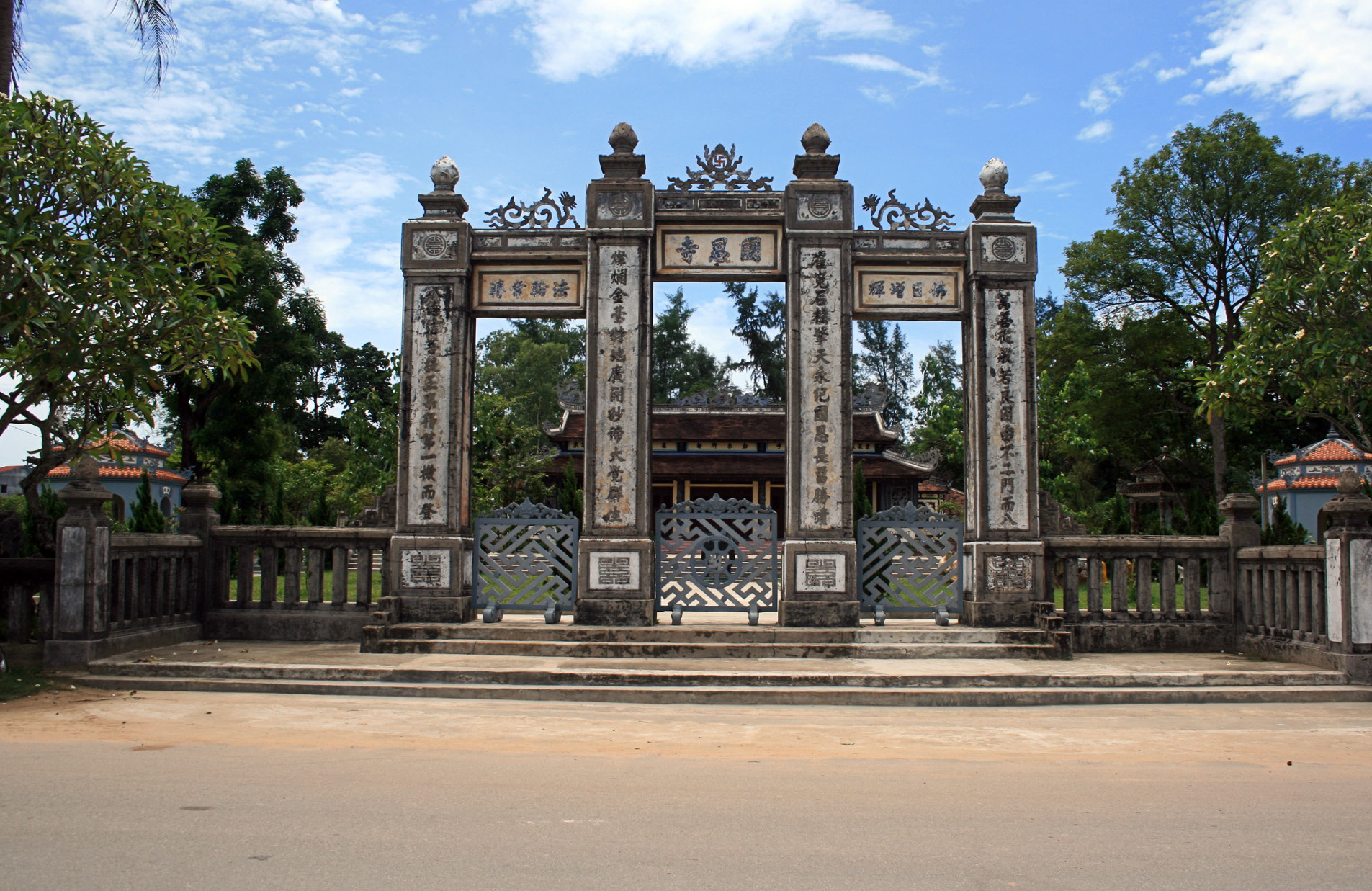
Tam quan gate at Quốc Ân Temple

In 1689, the Nguyễn Lord Nguyễn Phúc Trân had the name of the temple changed to the Quốc Ân Temple, and gave the temple an exemption from the land taxation system. Chùa Quốc Ân is the seat of a Buddhist patriarch lineage of central Vietnam, since Zen Master Thích Nguyên Thiều was the 33rd patriarch of the Lâm Tế Zen School. Today, the bulk of Buddhists in central and southern Vietnam are believed to have taken refuge under Thích Nguyên Thiều's lineage of disciples and students. After the passing of Thích Nguyên Thiều, the ruling Nguyễn Lord of the time, Nguyễn Phúc Chu posthumously conferred him with imperial titles.

During the time of the Nguyễn dynasty, which was founded in 1802 and was derived from the Nguyễn lords, the temple was renovated many times. In 1805 Long Thành, the elder sister of Emperor Gia Long personally funded a renovation project.

At the time, the temple was a modest and simple. In 1822, the temple was the subject of another imperial funded renovation project, this time funded by Gia Long's son and successor, Emperor Minh Mạng. In 1825, the abbot died and a stupa was built in the garden of the temple, in which his remains were interred. The temple was the subject of another phase of expansion and renovation between 1837 and 1842. From 1846 to 1863, a triple gate was built, along with further shrines.

At the front of the temple complex is the main ceremonial hall, while the patriarch hall is at the rear, while the sangha's quarters are at the sides. The main hall has a shrine commemorating the birth of Prince Siddhartha, who went on to achieve enlightenment as Gautama Buddha. In the front yard of the temple, there is a plaque in 1729 erected by the Nguyễn Lord of the time, Nguyễn Phúc Chu, praising the spiritual achievements of the temple founder, Thích Nguyên Thiều.
