= Kim Liên Temple =

- Chùa Kim Liên
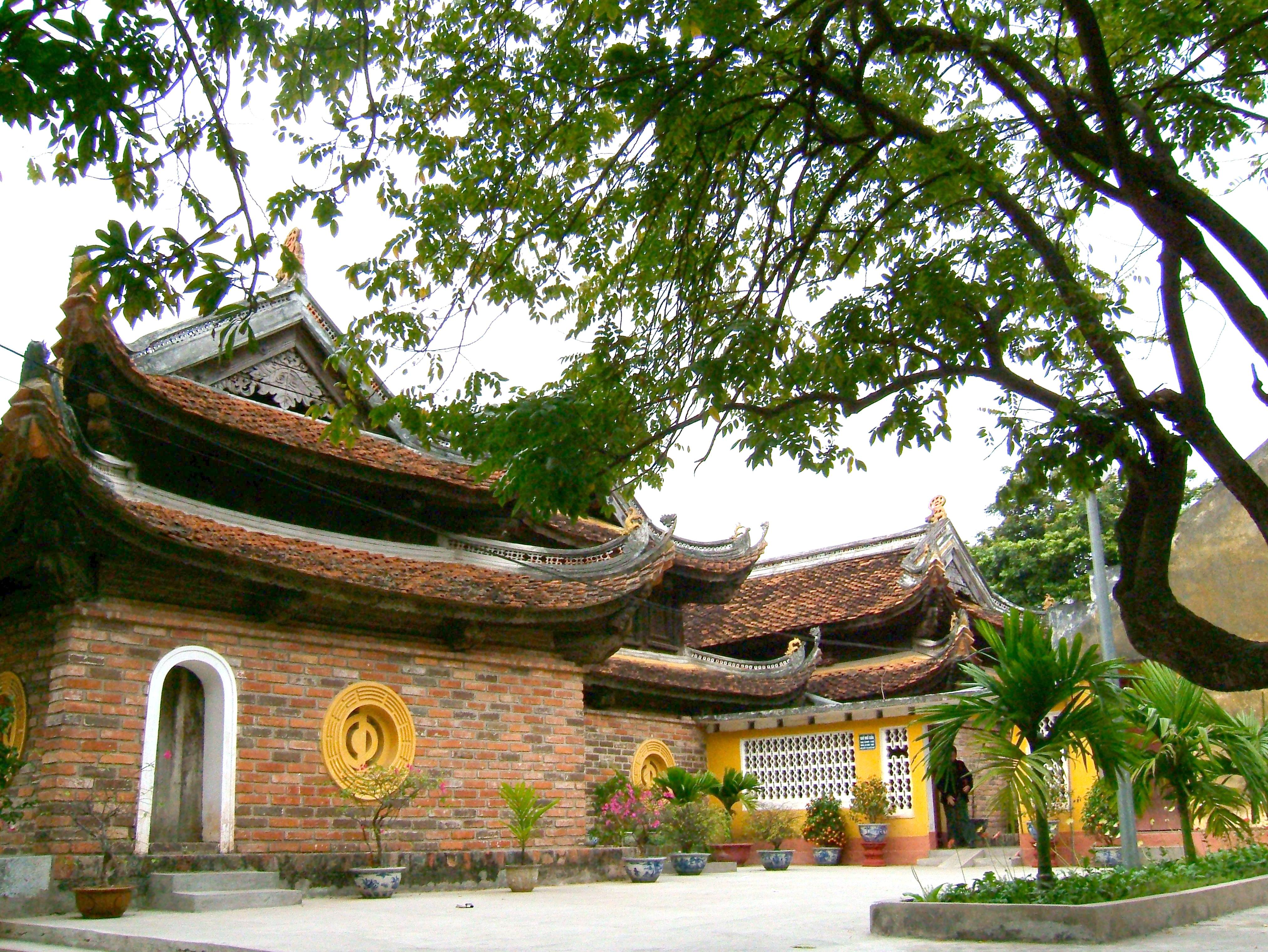
- Kim Liên Pagoda

Religion
- Affiliation: Buddhism
- District: Tây Hồ

Location
- Municipality: Hanoi
- Country: Vietnam
- Administration: Vietnam Buddhist Sangha

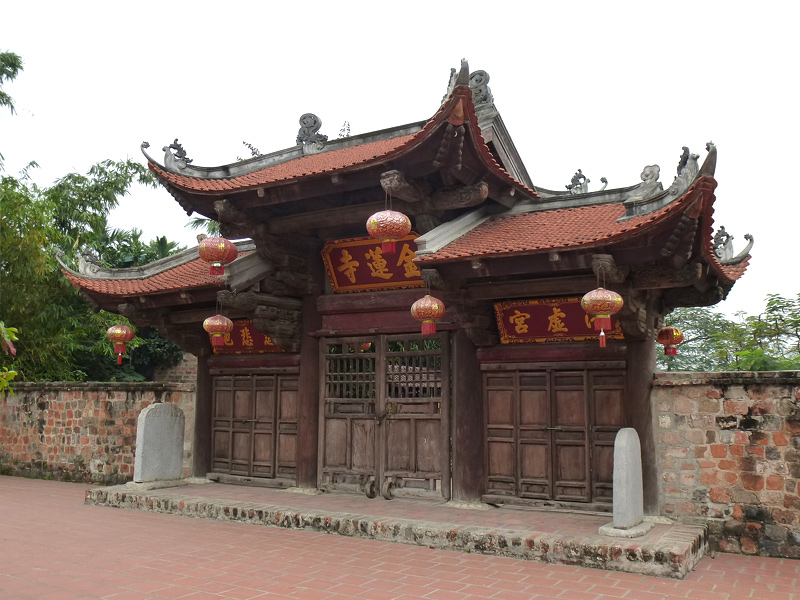
Tam quan of Kim Liên Pagoda, Hanoi

The Kim Liên Pagoda (Vietnamese: Chùa Kim Liên, Kim Liên tự), Chữ Hán: 金蓮寺) is a Buddhist pagoda in Hanoi. The pagoda is built on a strip of silt land by West Lake, then in Nghi Tàm village, today in Quảng An village, Tây Hồ district. According to tradition, the pagoda was built on the foundation of the Lý dynasty Từ Hoa Palace, named after princess Từ Hoa, daughter of Lý Thần Tông (1128–1138), in an area used as a royal silk farm. The current pagoda was reconstructed 1771–1792.
