= Tam quan =

Traditional Vietnamese gateway

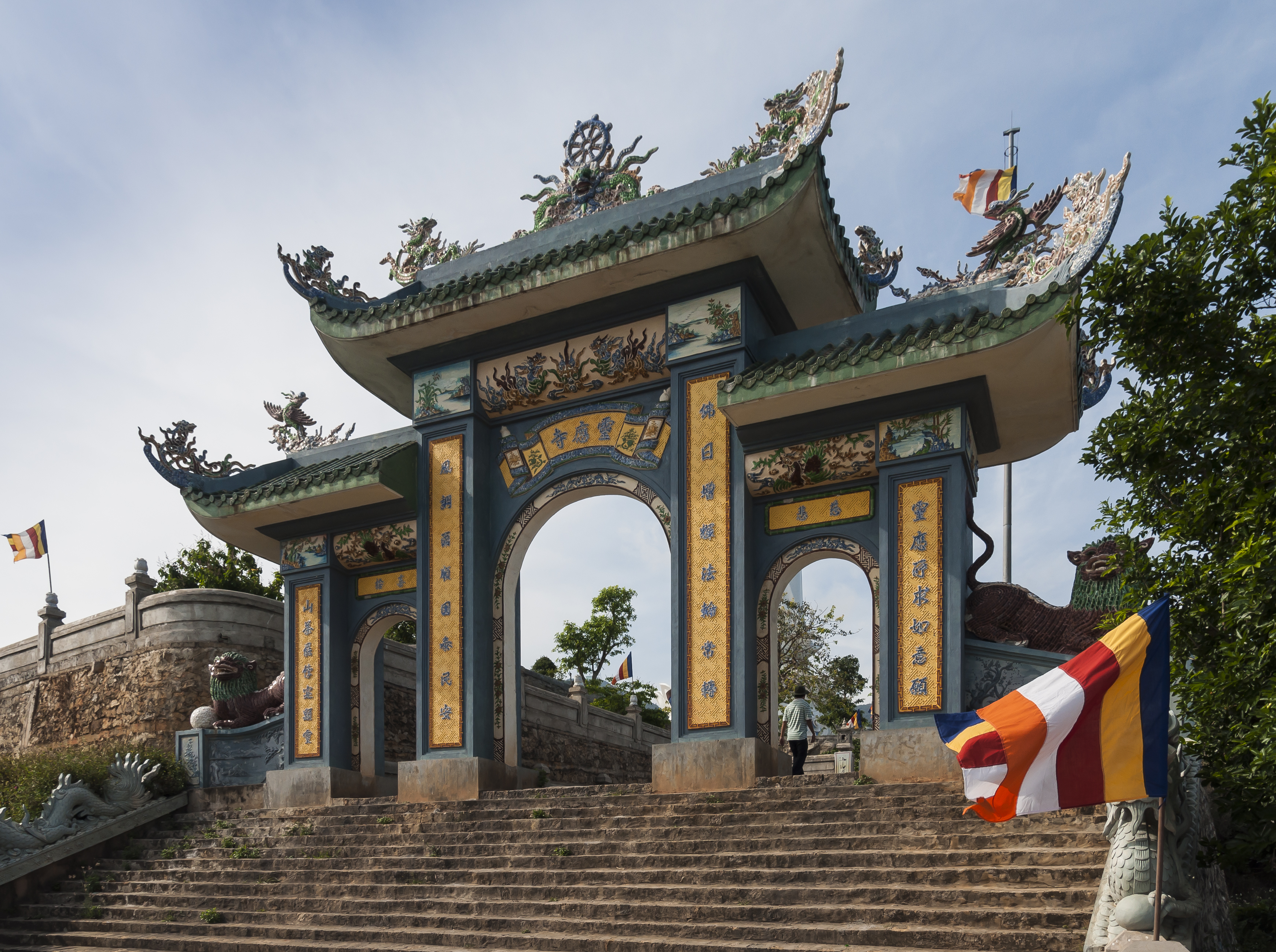
- Tam quan of Linh Ứng - Bãi Bụt Temple, Da Nang
- Vietnamese alphabet: Tam quan
- Chữ Hán: 三關

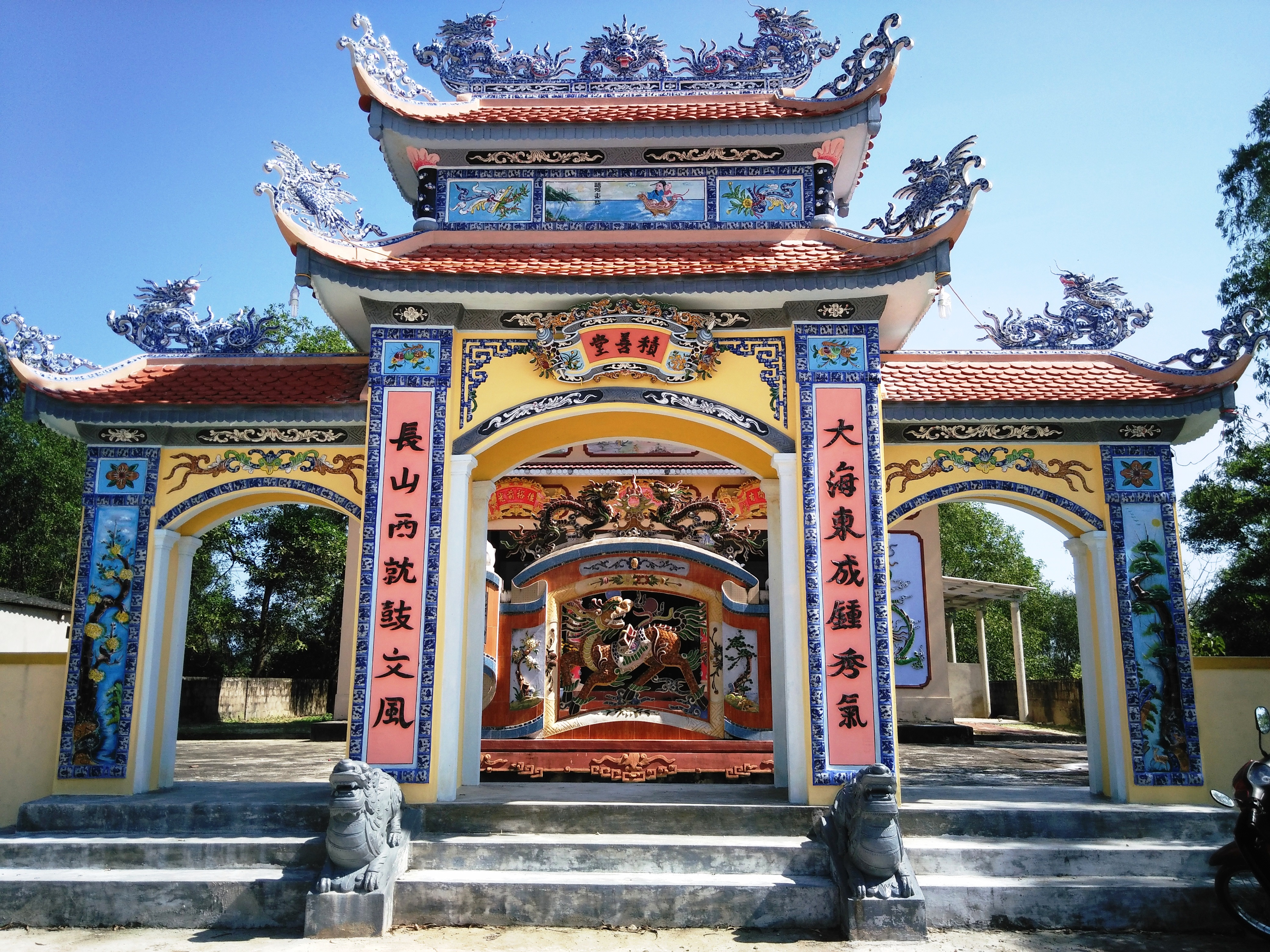
A typical Tam quan of folk architecture

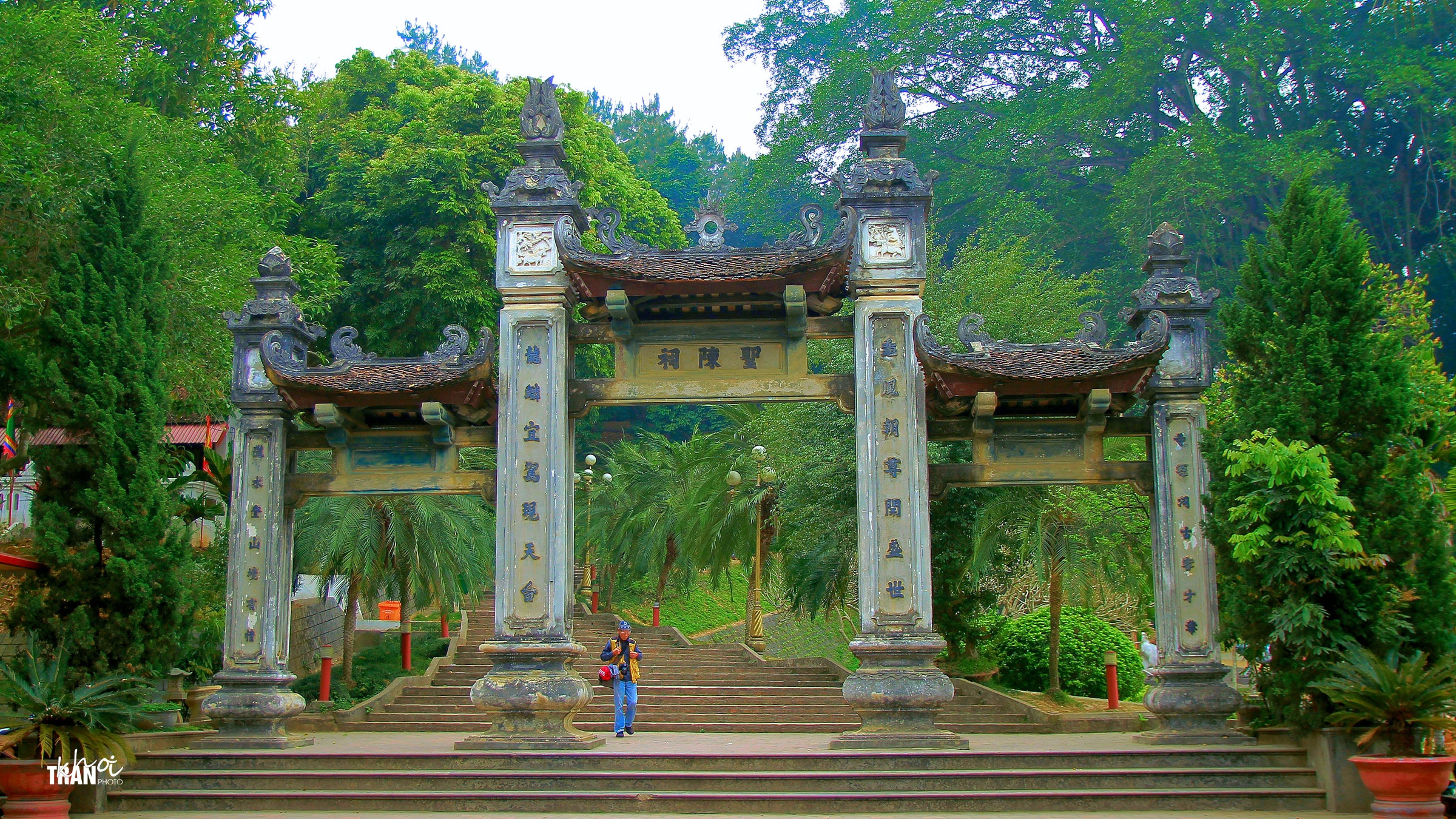
Tam quan of Thượng Temple (built in the style of Láng Temple)

A Tam quan (chữ Hán: 三關) or Tam môn (chữ Hán: 三門) is a style of traditional gateway symbolic of Vietnamese Buddhism. It has three aisles (traditionally, the middle aisle is the largest and the two side aisles are smaller). They are used in Buddhist works and in other religions such as Confucianism, Taoism, Vietnamese folk religion and Christianity. They are also used for non-religious modern buildings such as schools and People's committee buildings.

== Origin and meaning ==
The Tam quan carries the concept of "three ways of seeing" of Buddhism, including "hữu quan, 有觀)", "không quan, 空觀)" and "trung quan, 中觀)", representing the form (false), the void (anitya) and the middle of both. The second explanation is that the three gates are the gates of the Three Jewels. Another theory holds that the three gates are the "Samadhi" of the Zen sect. Therefore, countries that do not belong to Zen Buddhism do not have Tam quan as the entrance to the temple.

Tam quan gateways derive from Buddhist temple architecture that was transmitted from India to Vietnam via China.

== Architecture ==
Tam quan is mainly three gateways with the middle door usually larger than the two side doors. The wall of the gateway can be wooden or be made up of stone or brick. Above the gateway lies a tiled roof. The two sides of the path are often decorated with couplets, and the front of the door is inscribed with the name of the temple or of the gateway.

=== The common form of the gate ===
The regular form of the gate has three gateways and is also the most common type. Typically Buddhist couplets in Hán văn (Literary Chinese) line the centre doorway. With the name of the place or the gate on a placard on the top of the centre gate.

=== Multiple floor gate ===
Small gateways only make one floor, but when built on a larger scale, many places build two roofs or build upper floors. Brick and stone gates almost always have an upper level, although it may just be a fake upper floor to increase the gate's height. There are places built into three floors. When designing the upper floor, there is a pagoda that uses it to hang the bells, the plaques, and the drums used in temple rituals...

=== Four pillar gate ===
Tam quan style of four Trụ biểu instead of building walls, uses four pillars, the middle two pillars are higher than the two side pillars to divide into three paths. Above, connecting the four Trụ biểu is a stylized beam to make the gate's centre.

The gateway of Láng Temple is characterized by a four Trụ biểu structure with a curved roof, giving the temple's Tam quan a unique and unique shape in the traditional architecture of Vietnam.

=== Some popular variations ===
Variations of the Tam quan are found in some pagodas built into five aisles such as in the case of Sét temple, Hanoi.

== Application in non-religious works ==
Tam quan is used for many non-religious public works in Vietnam.

=== Village gate ===
Traditional Vietnamese village gates usually have only one path (although there are also some places built in the form of a Tam quan), but many places today will build a village gate in the form of a Tam quan to use as a kind of welcome gate.

== Gallery ==
Tam quan in decorative painting at Indochina University lecture hall, Hanoi

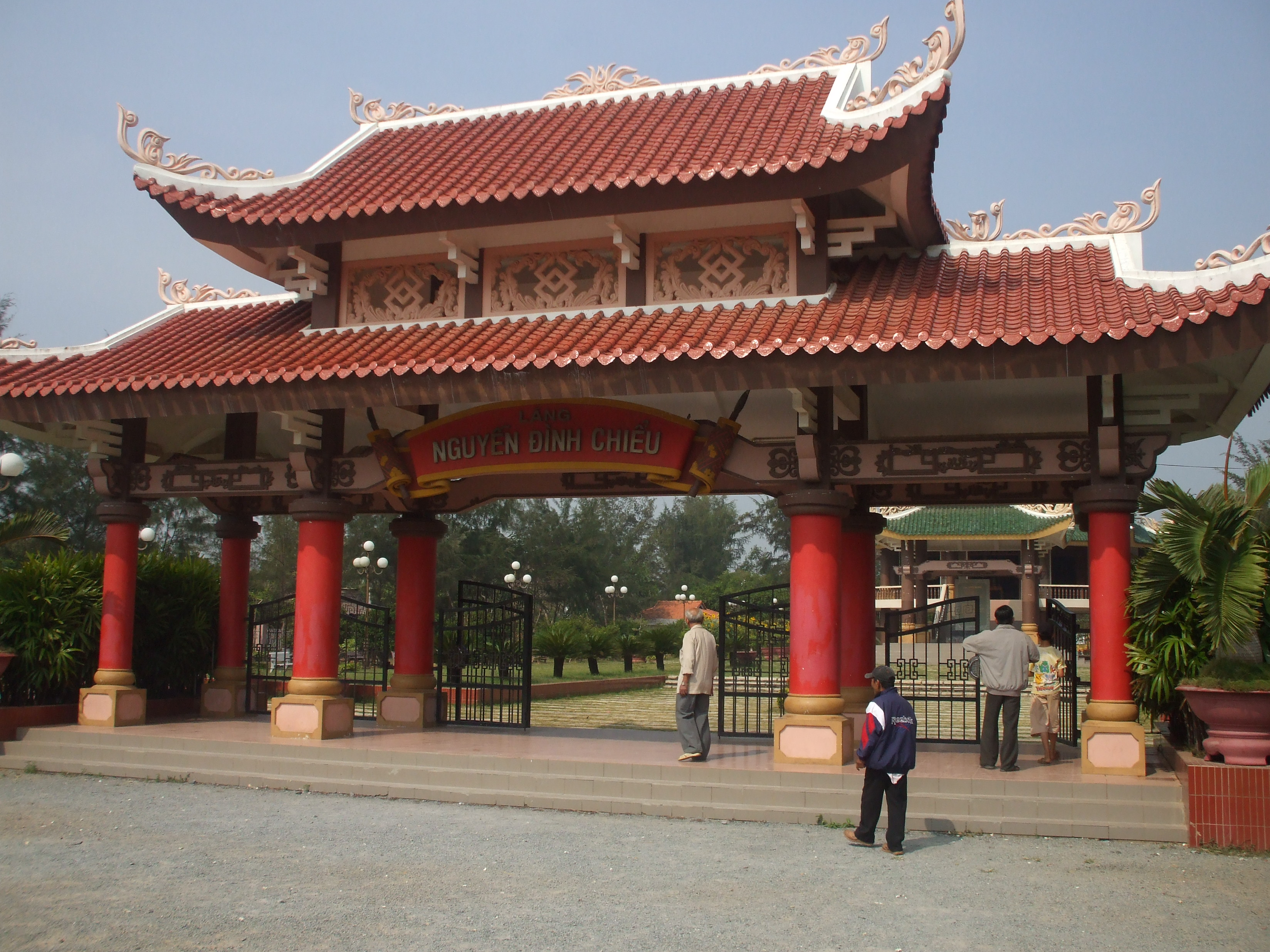
Tam quan at Tomb of Nguyễn Đình Chiểu

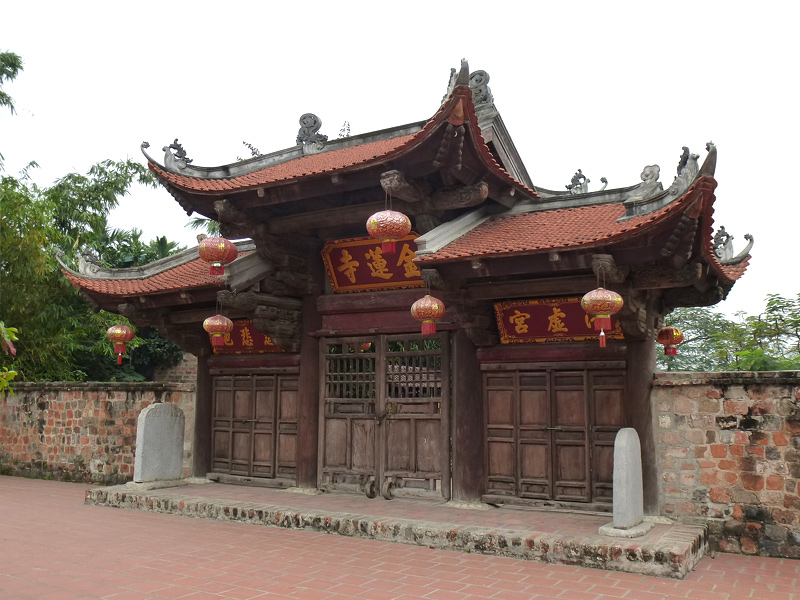
Tam quan of Kim Liên Temple, Hanoi

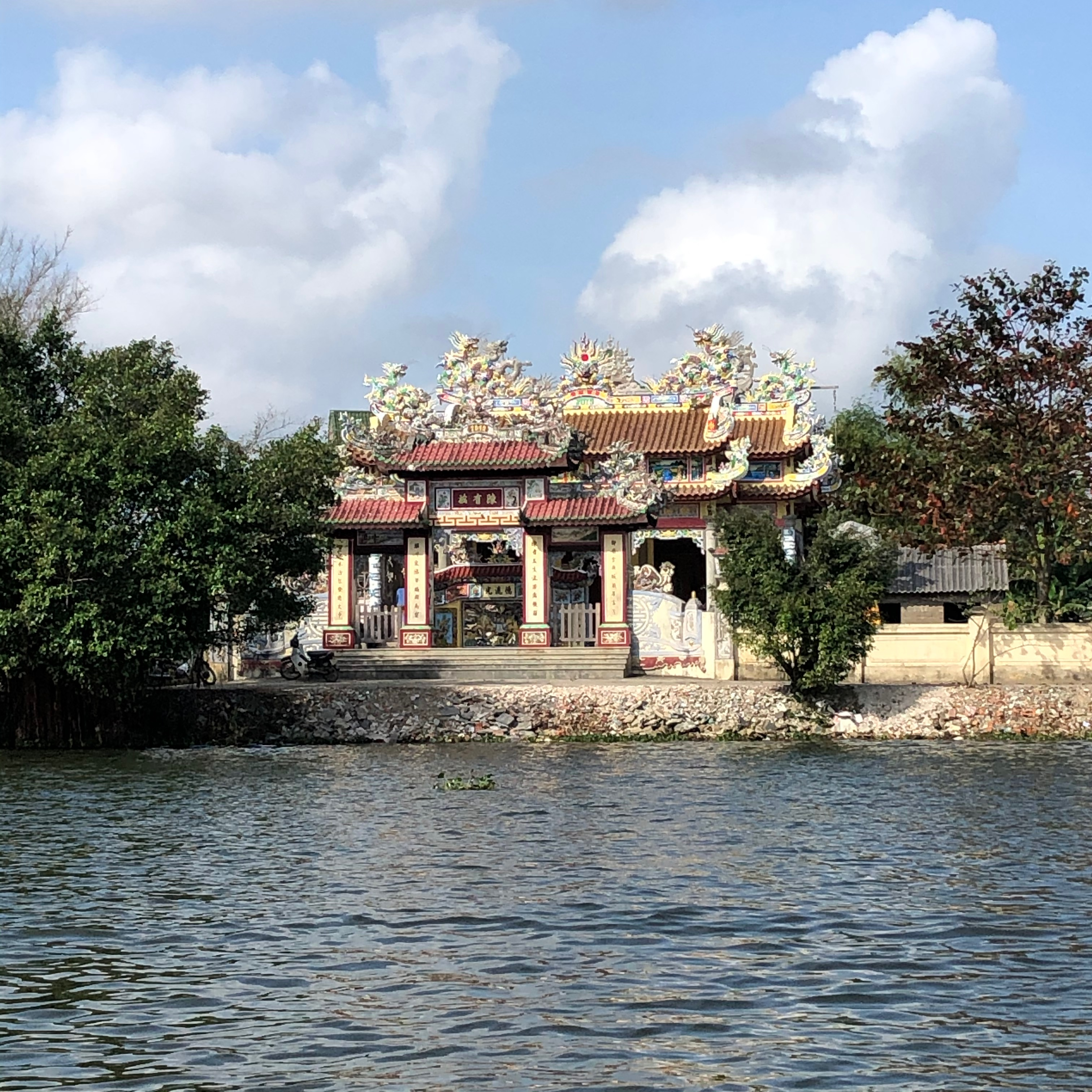
Tam quan of a temple next to the river

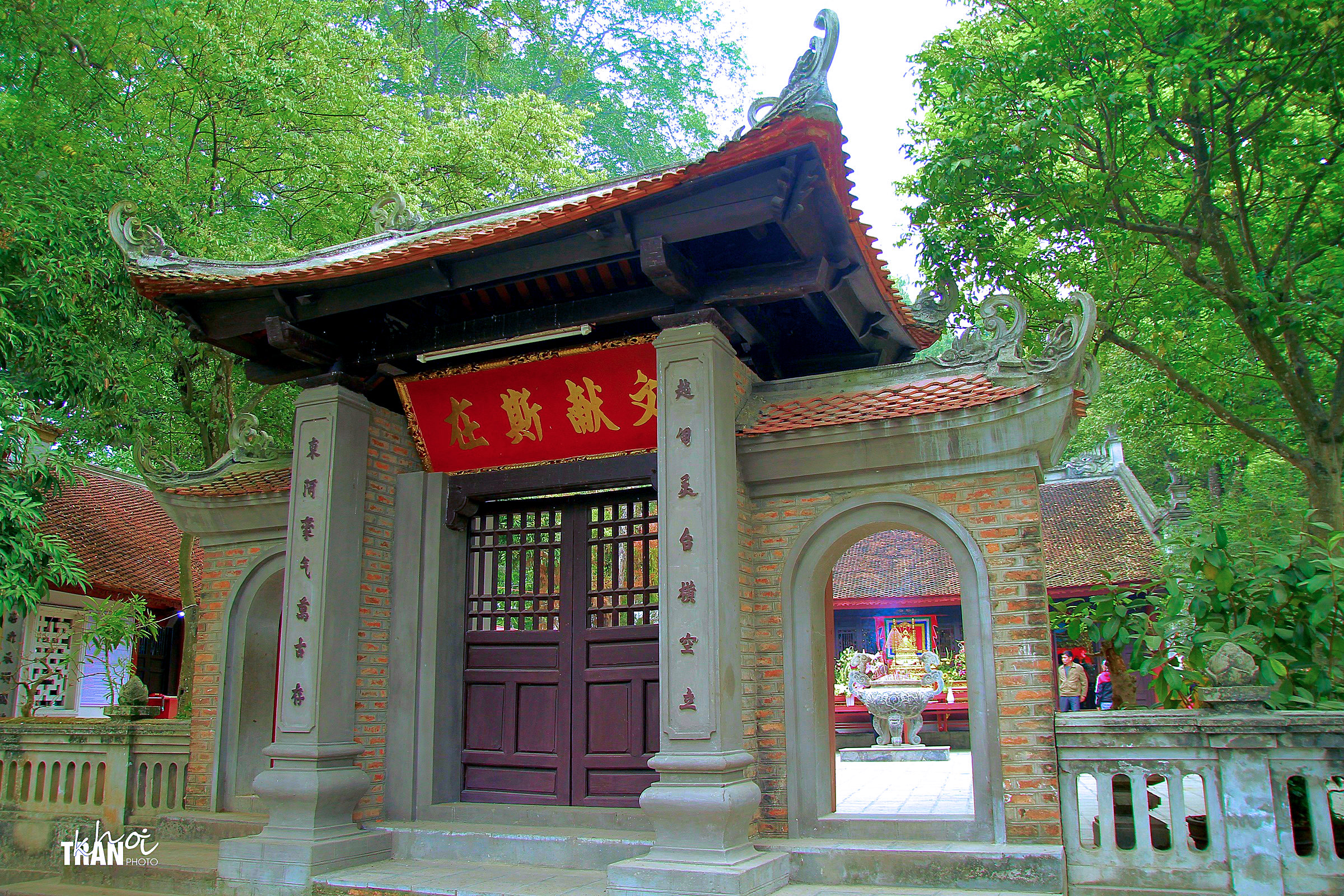
Tam quan of Thượng Temple

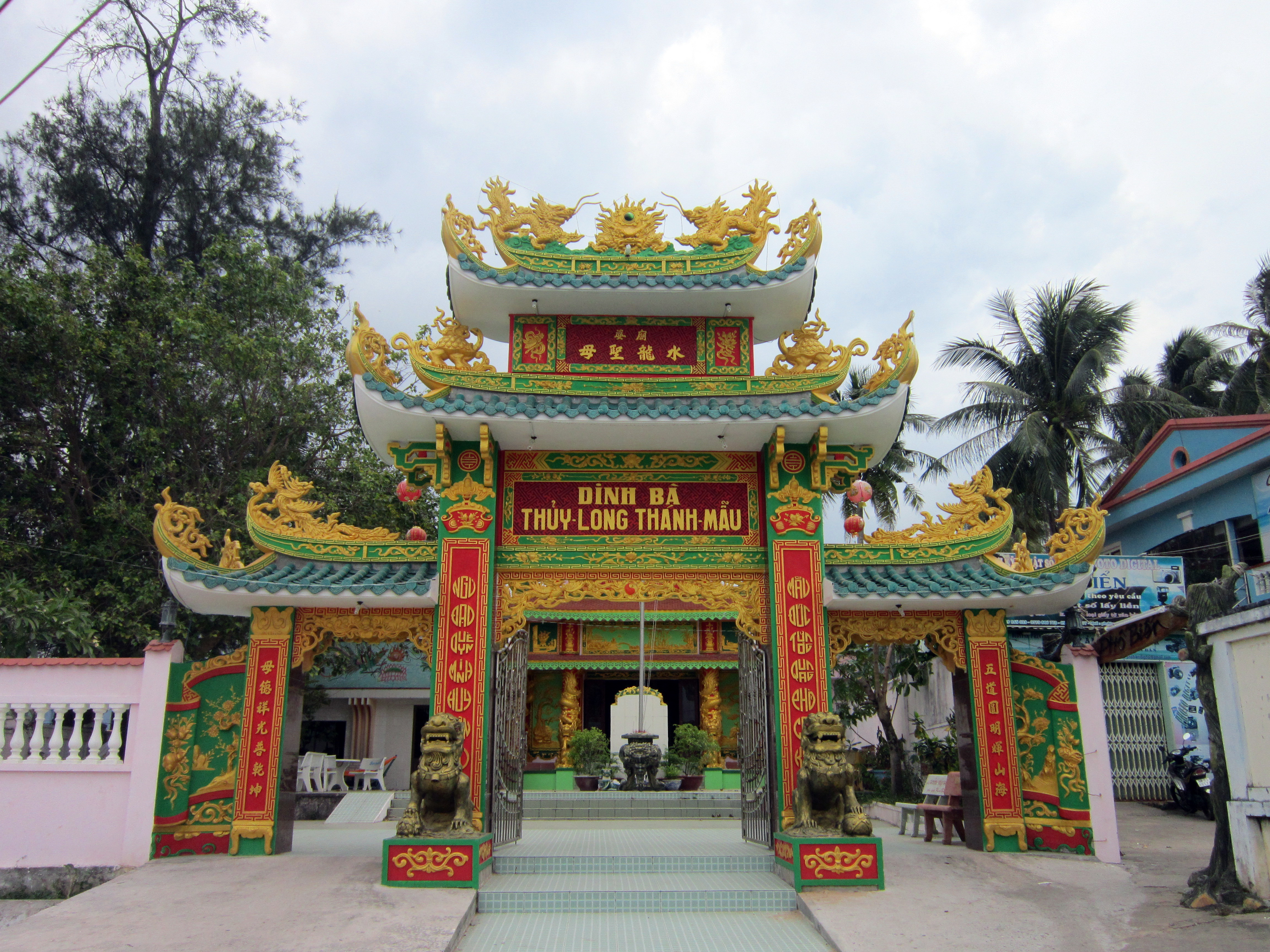
Tam quan of Thủy Long Thánh Mẫu Temple

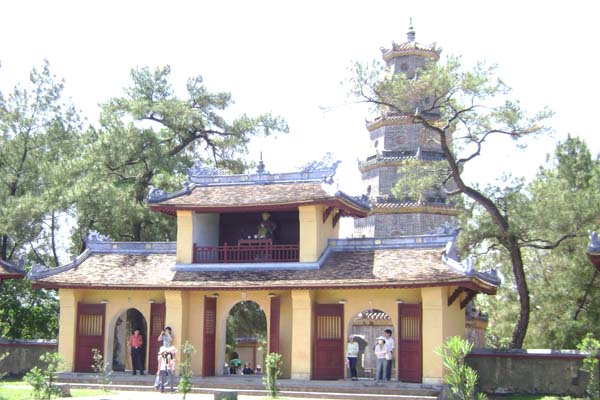
Tam quan of Thiên Mụ Temple built guardhouse above the middle entrance, Huế royal style

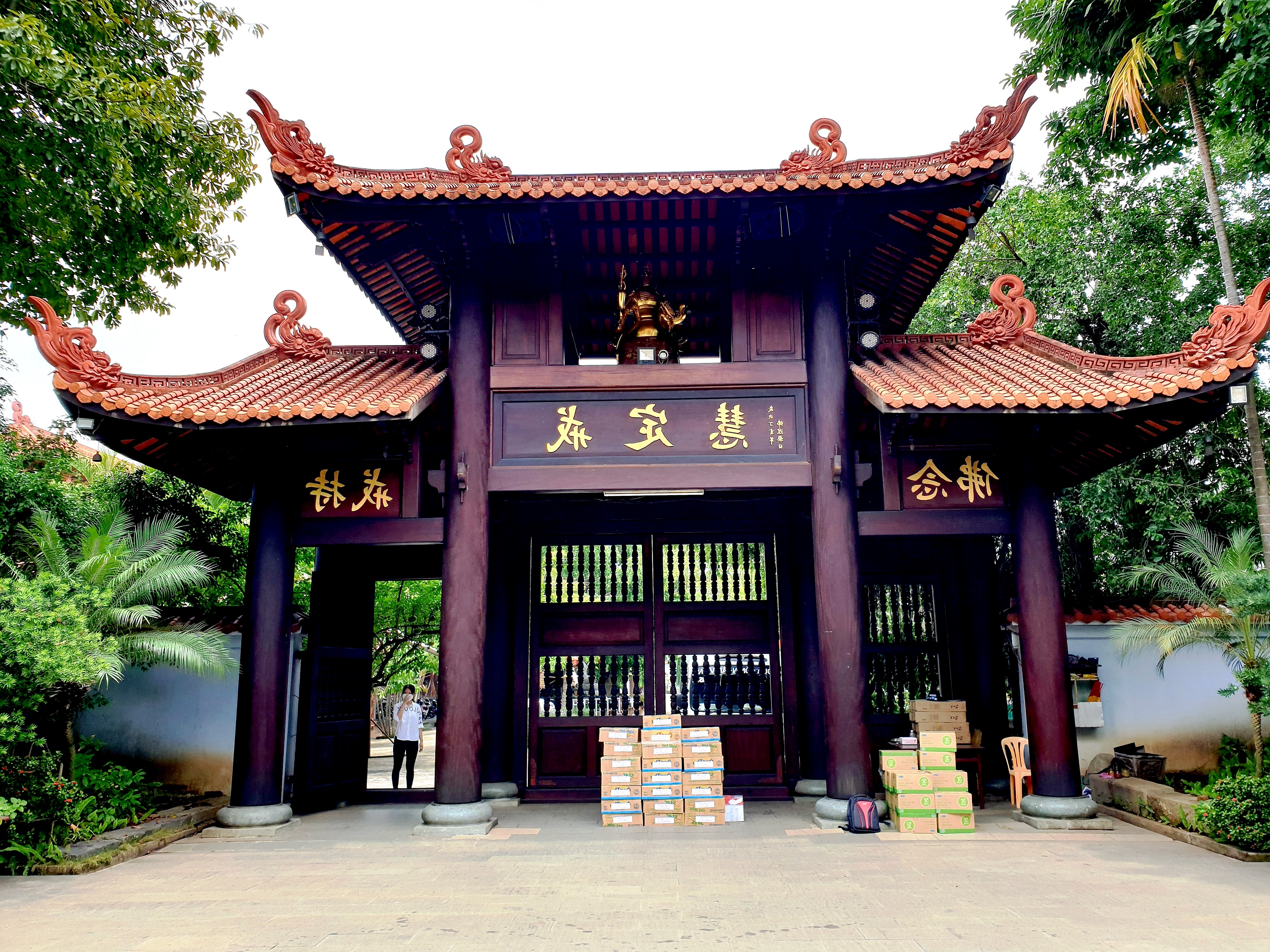
Tam quan of Huệ Nghiêm Temple

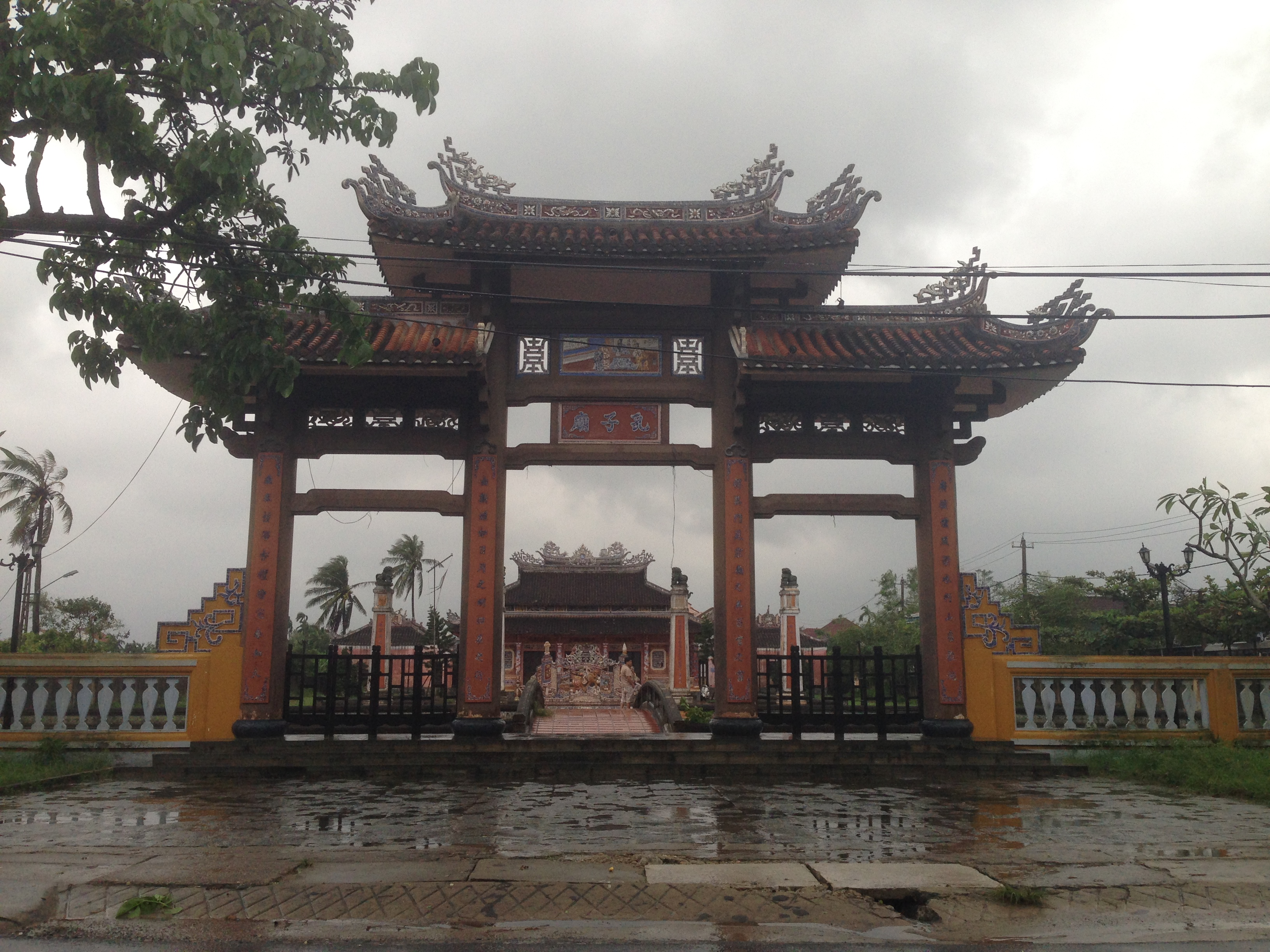
Tam quan at a temple in Hội An

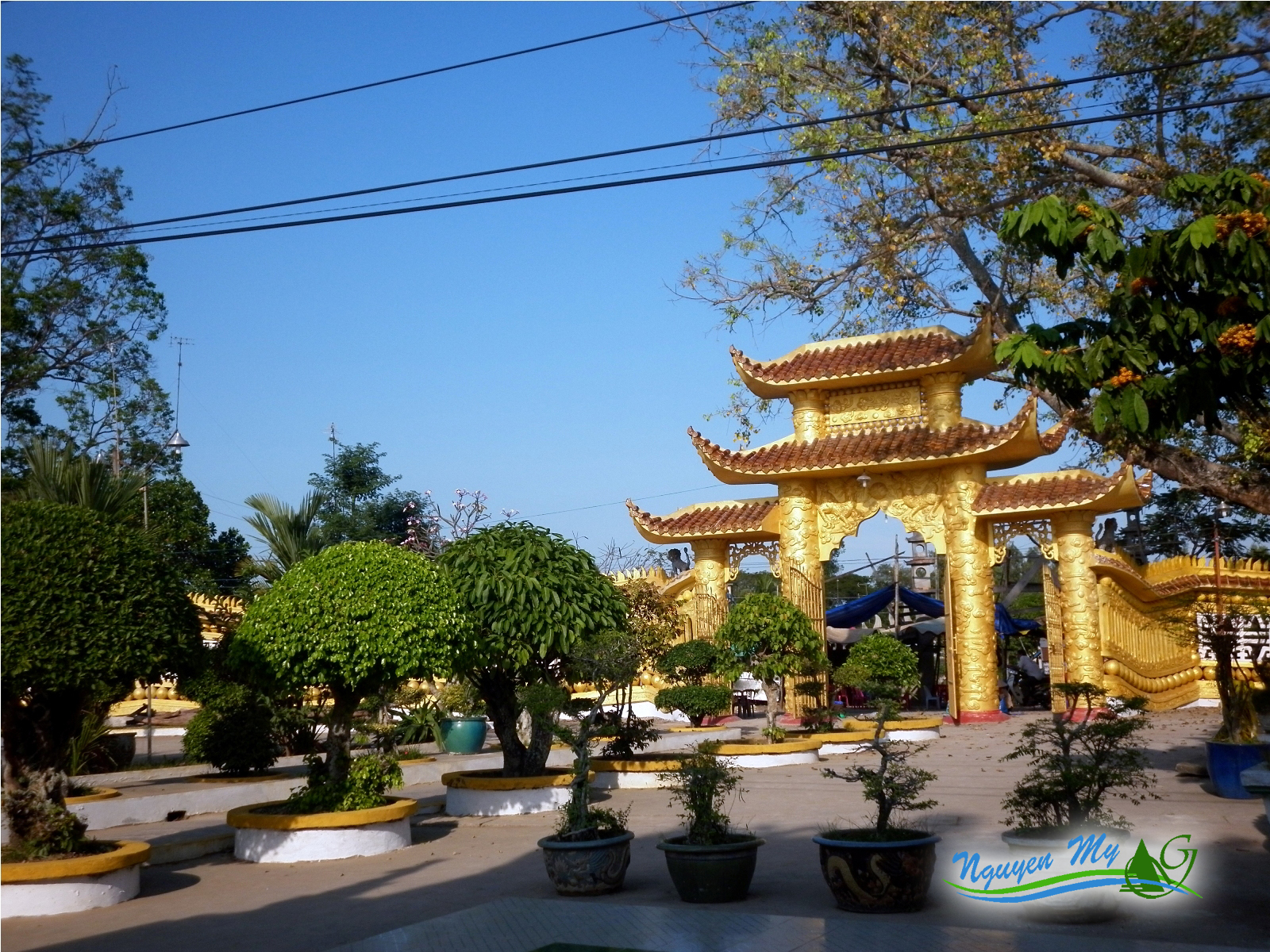
Tam quan of Tây An Cổ Tự, An Giang

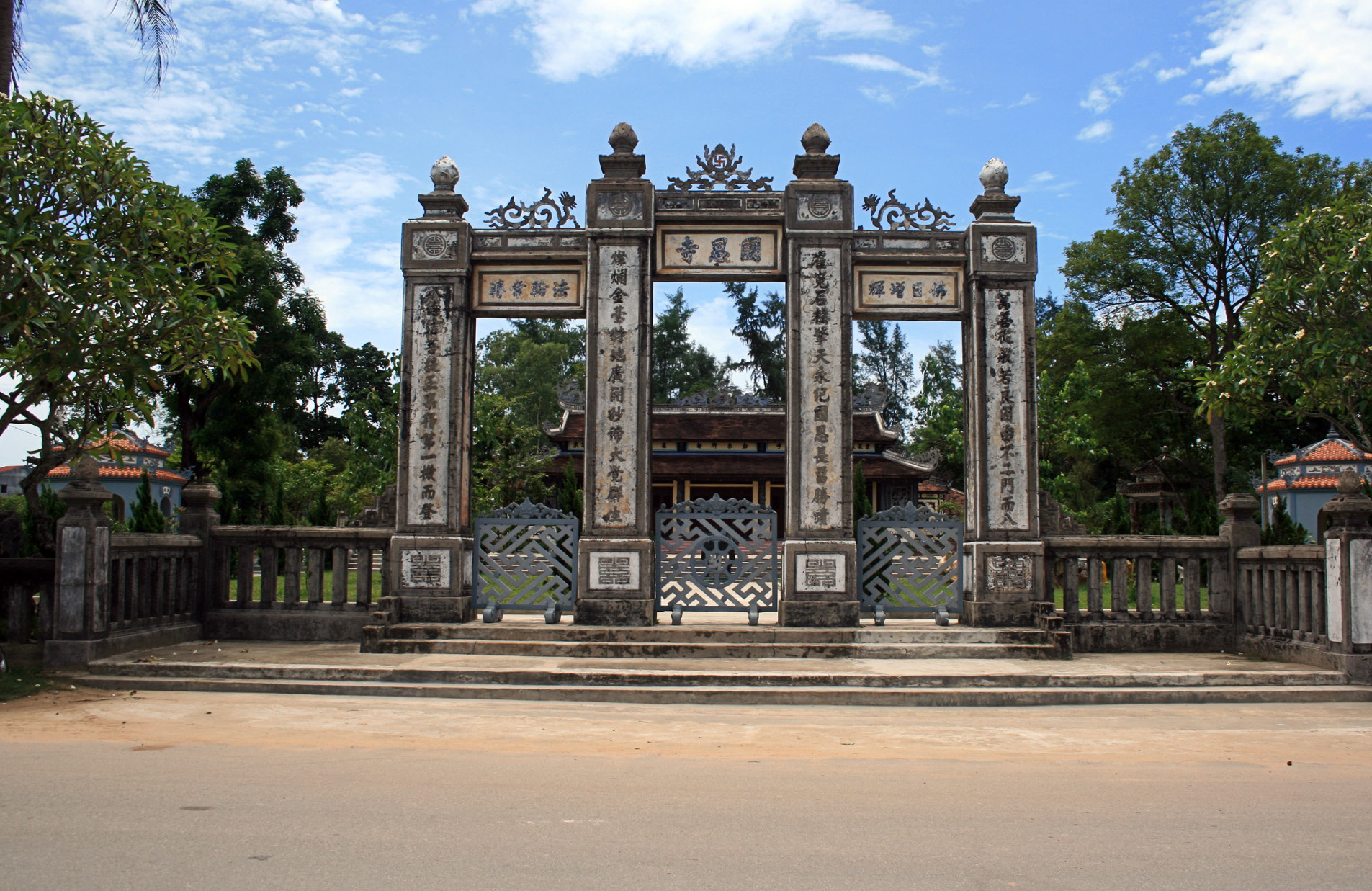
Tam quan style of four pillars Quốc Ân Temple, Huế

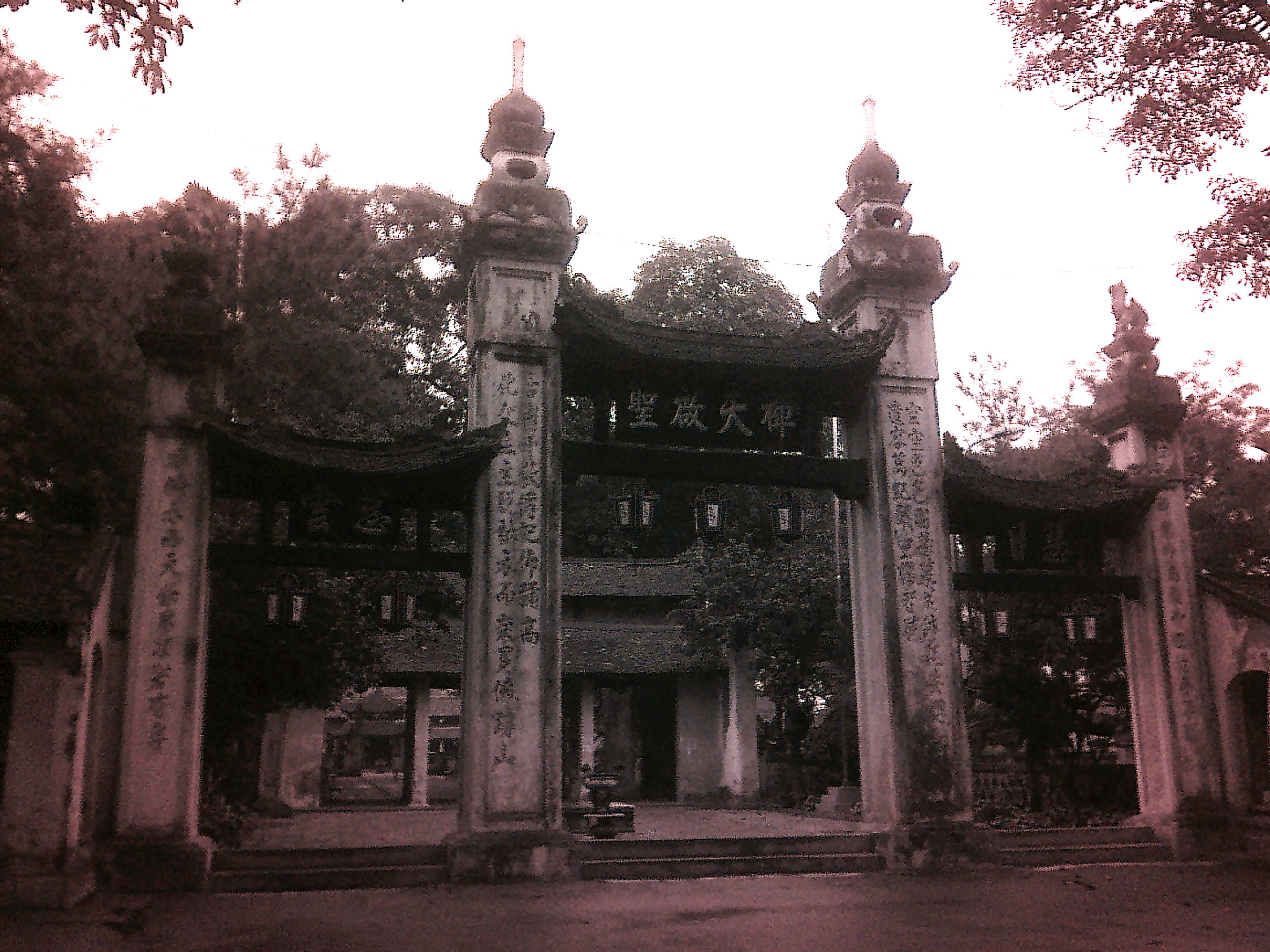
The Tam quan of Láng Temple, Hanoi is a four-pillar style combined with a curved roof

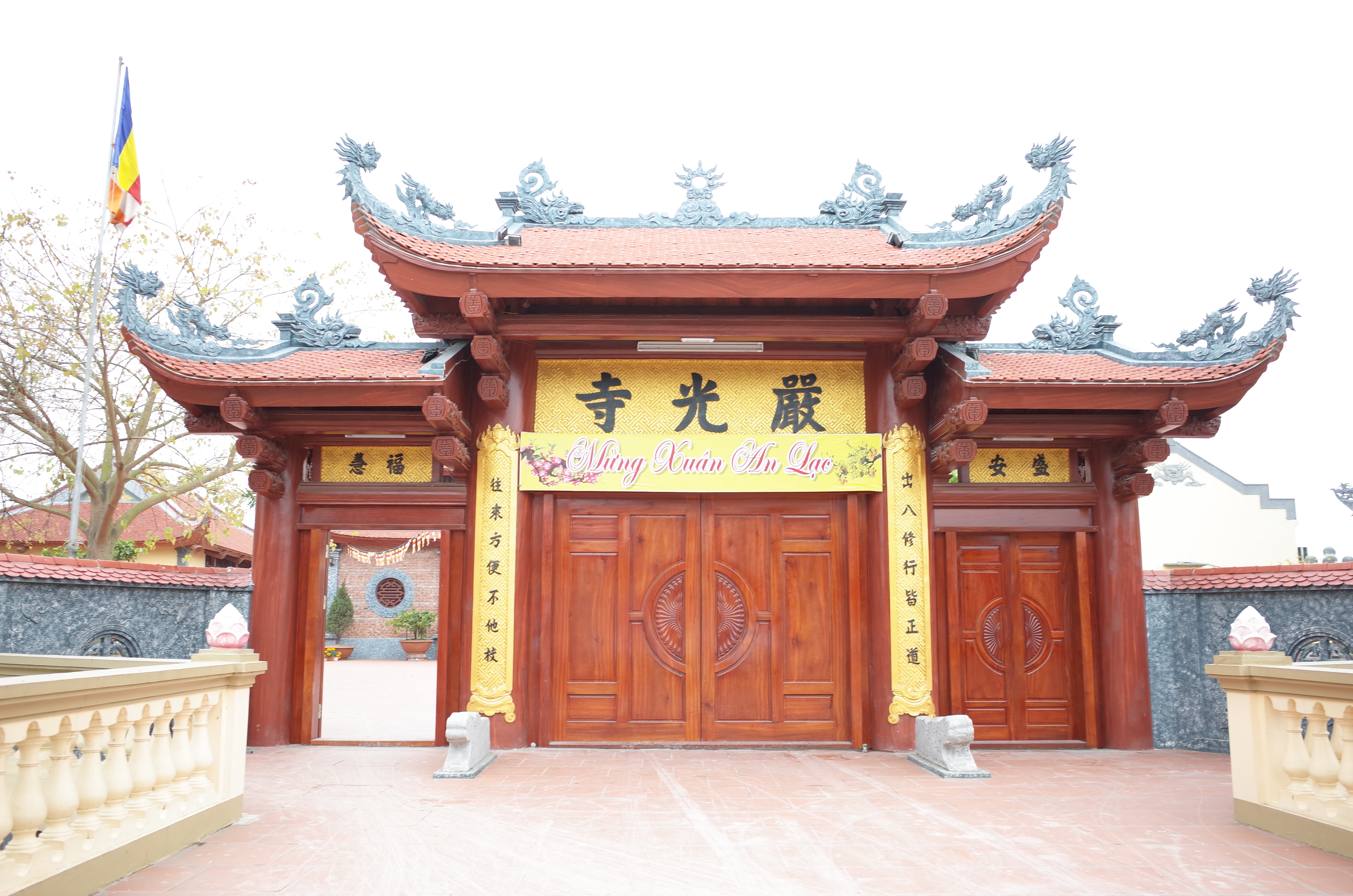
Tam quan of Nghiêm Quang temple, Thận Trai village, Bắc Ninh

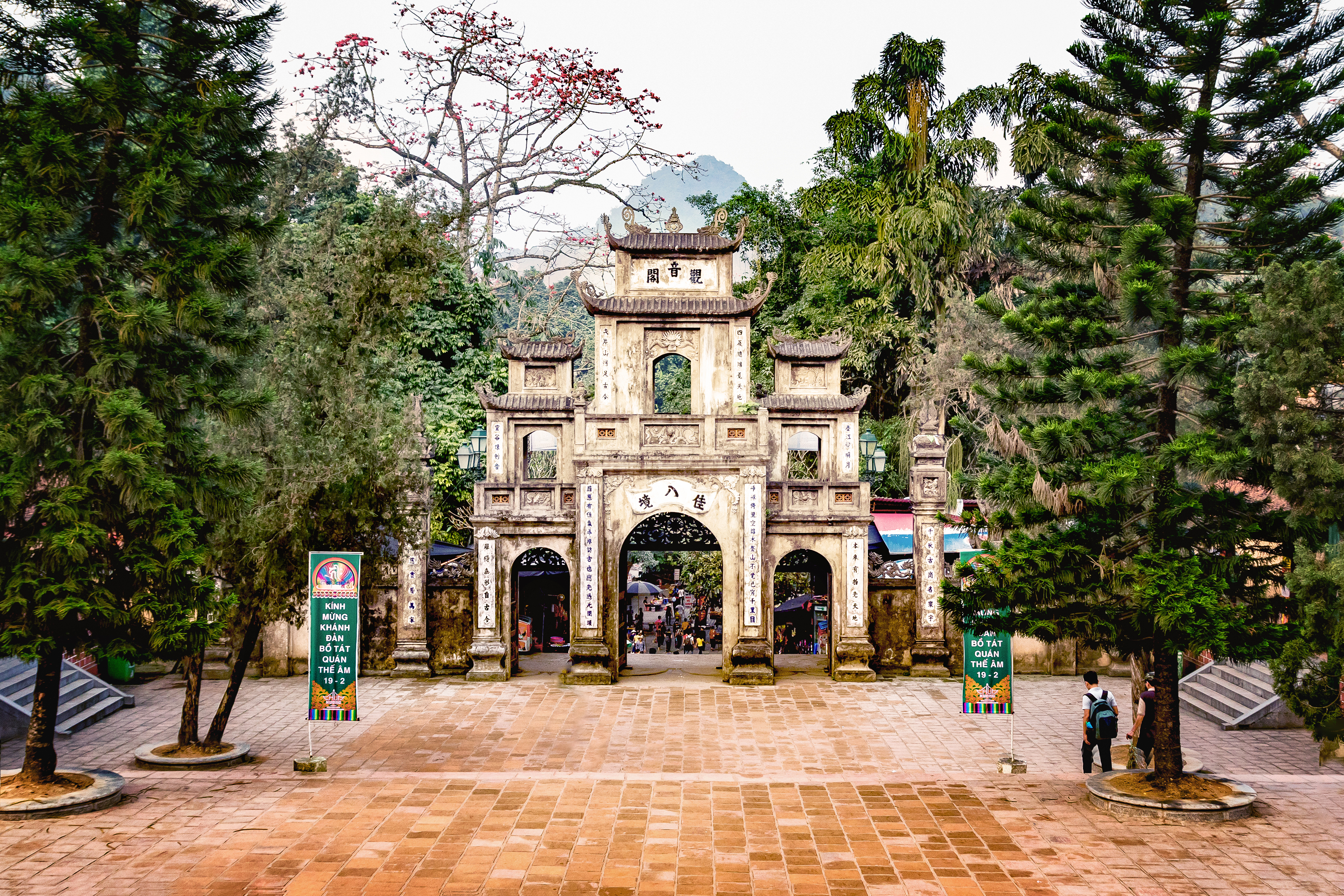
Tam quan Hương Temple, the type with the upper floor

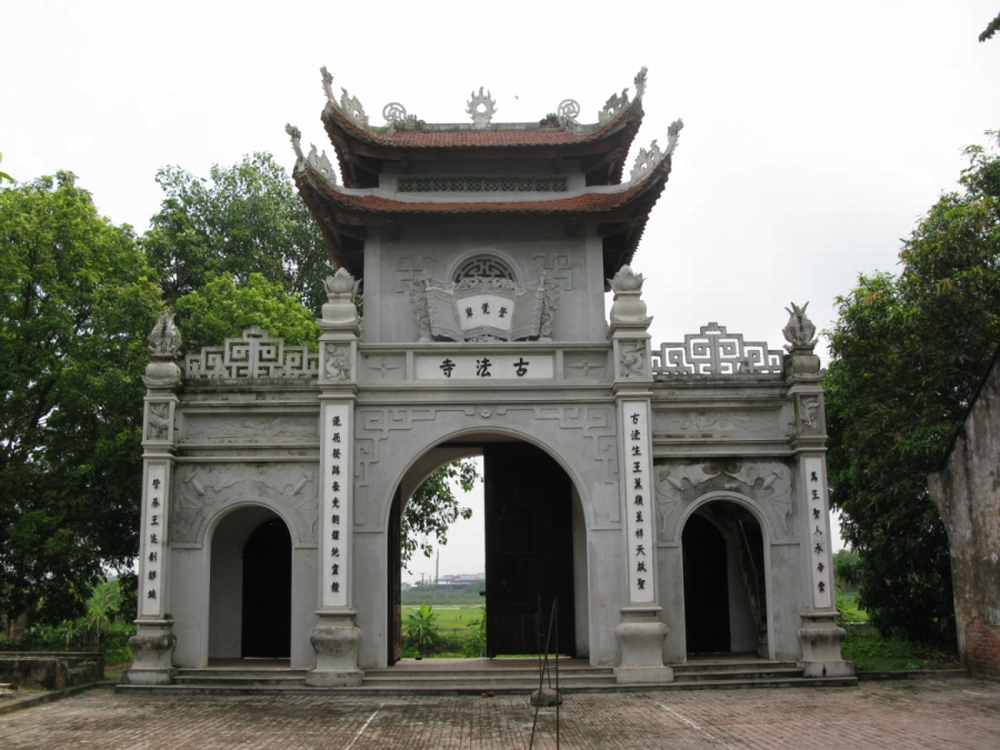
Tam quan Dận Temple, the type with the upper floor

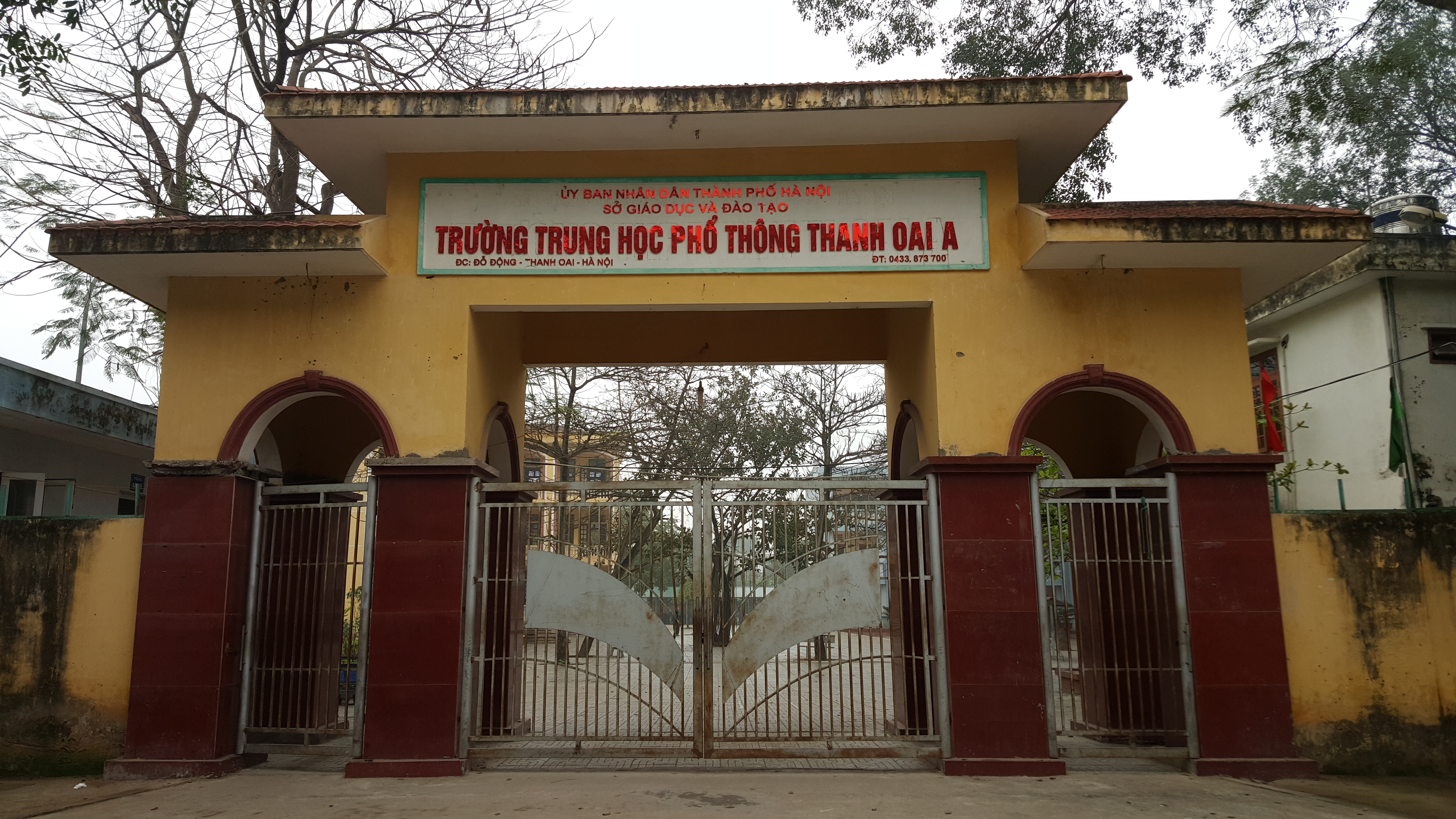
A school gate built in the form of a Tam quan

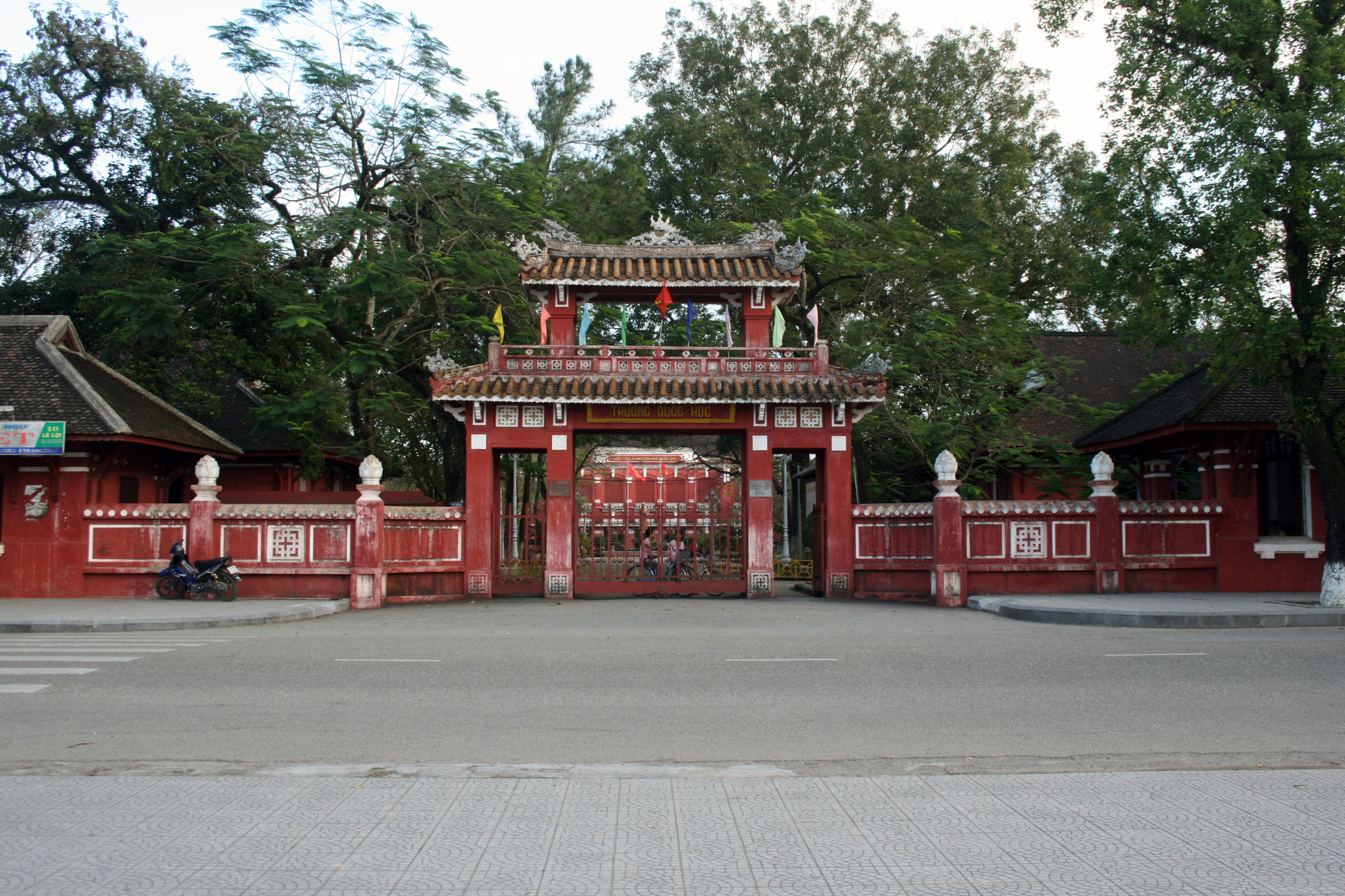
Gate of Quốc Học – Huế High School for the Gifted

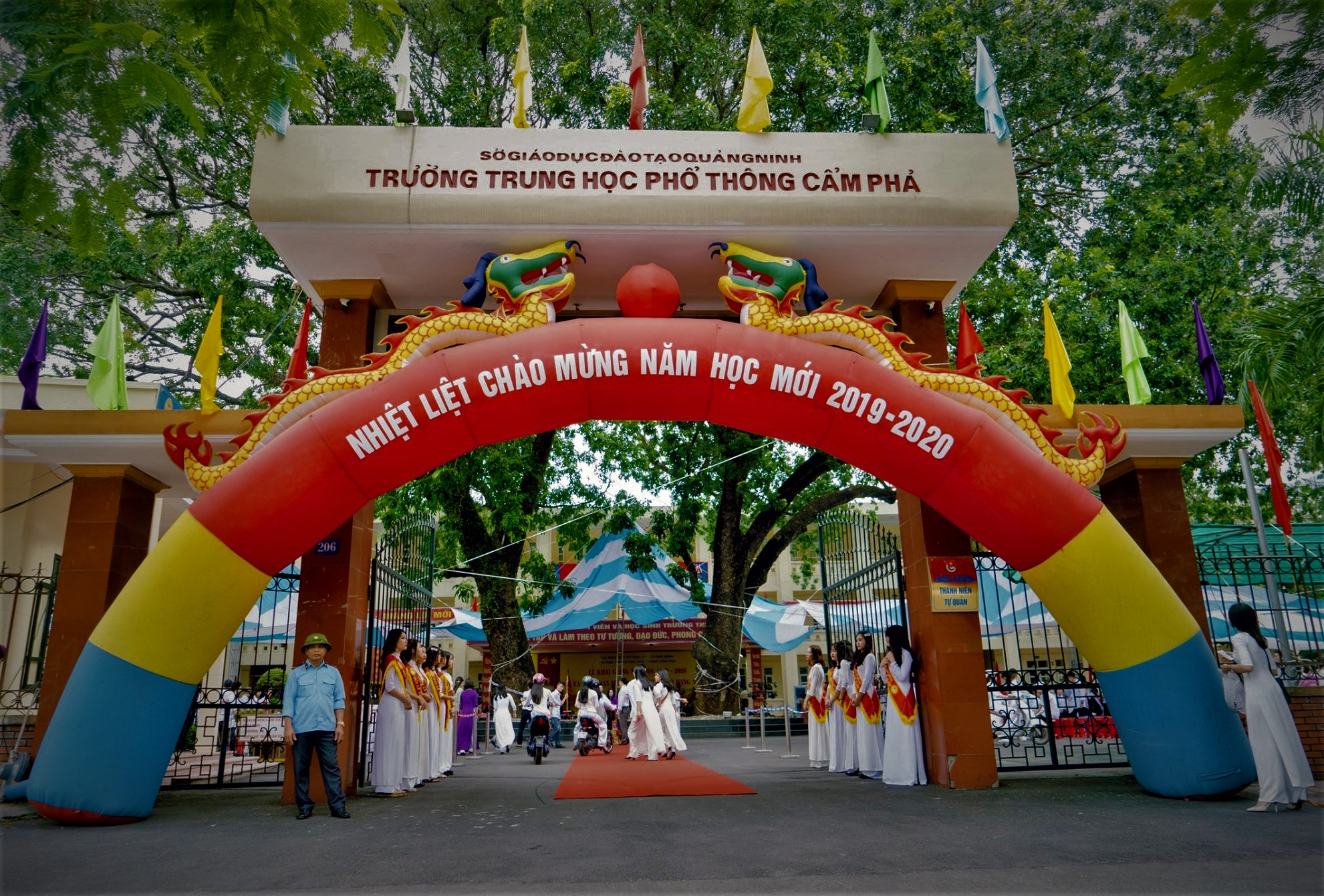
Gate of Cẩm Phả High School

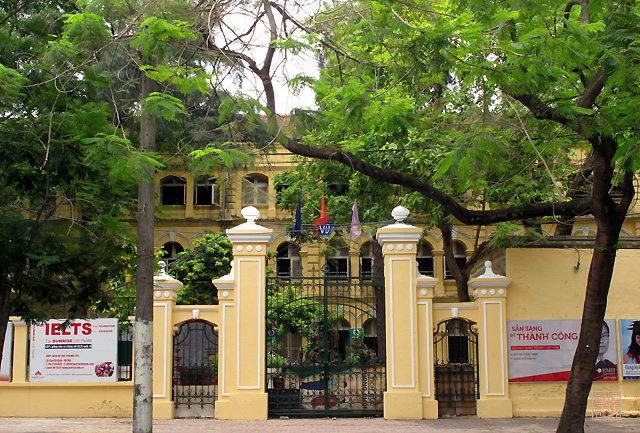
Việt Đức school gate

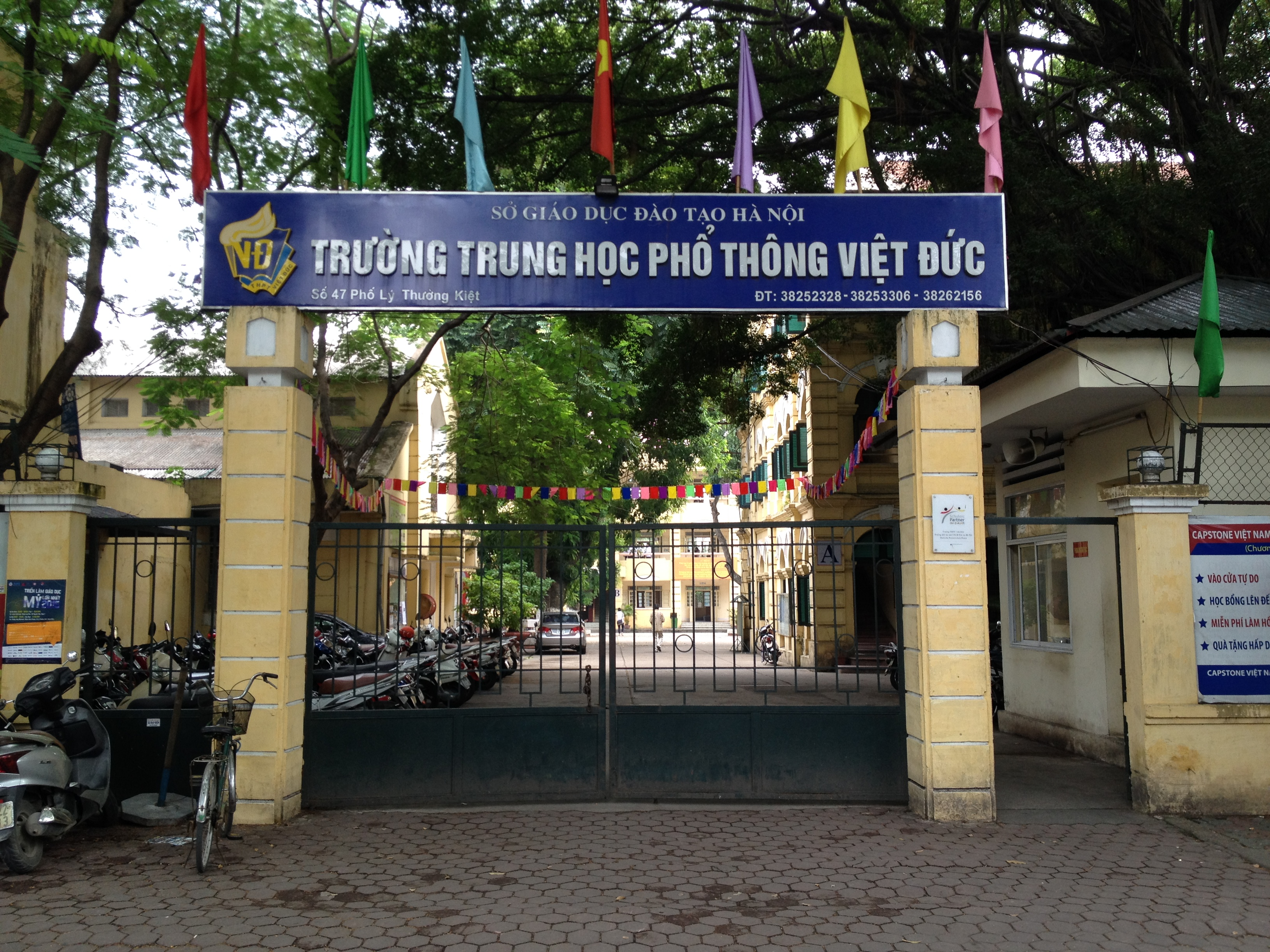
Gate of Việt Đức High School, Lý Thường Kiệt, Hanoi

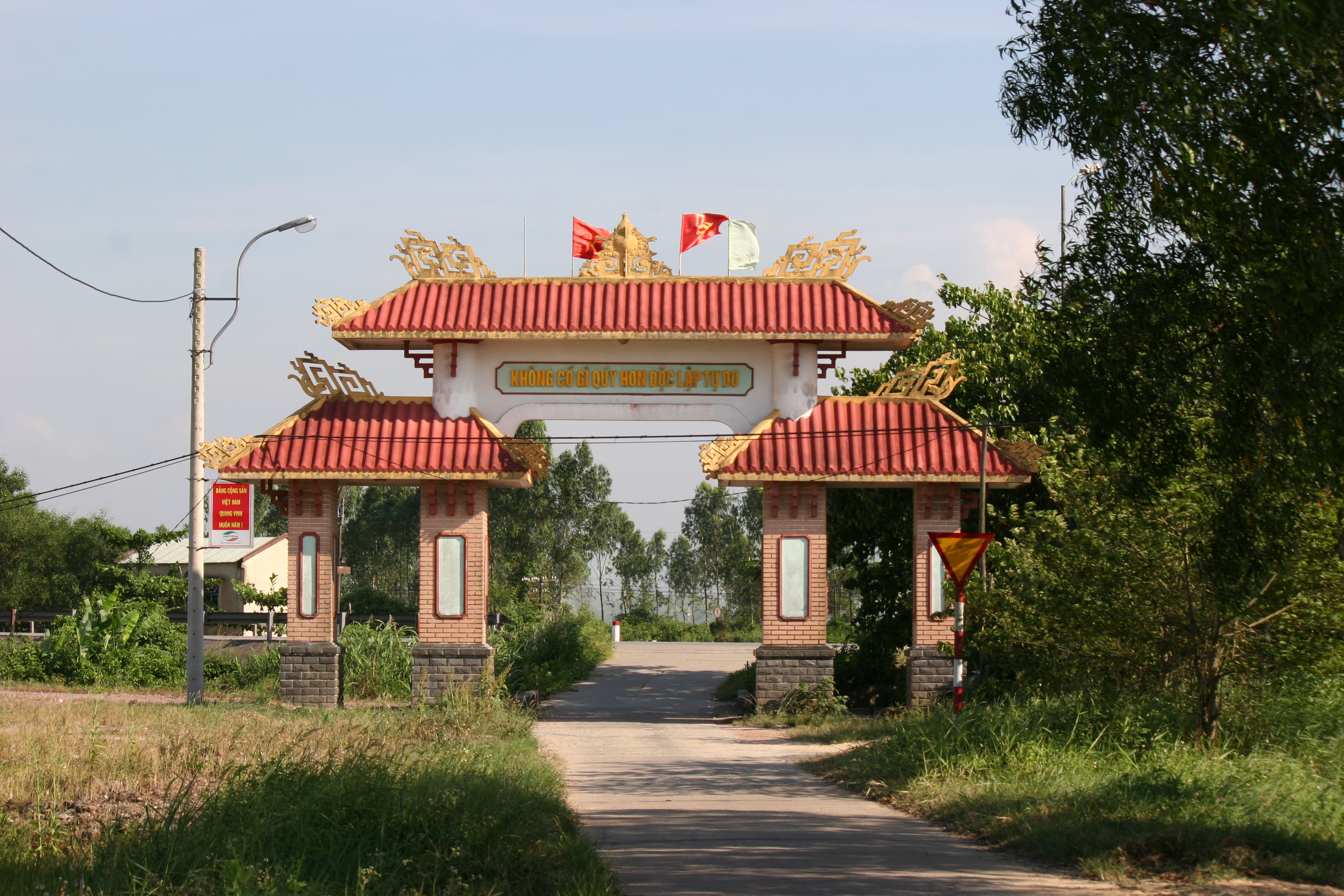
Thanh Lương village gate

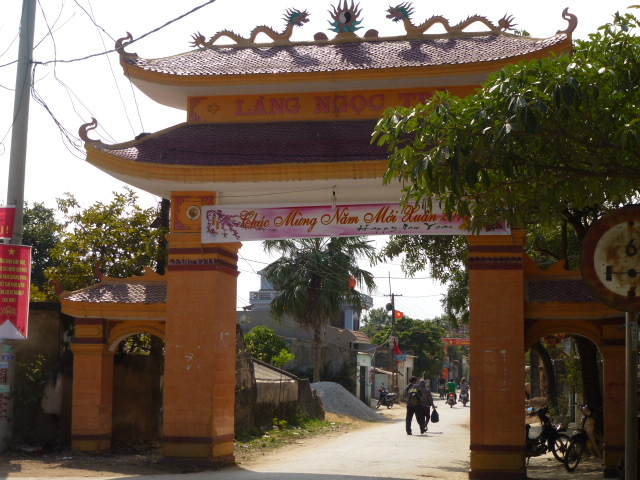
Ngọc Trà village gate, Quảng Trung commune, Quảng Xương, Thanh Hóa, Vietnam

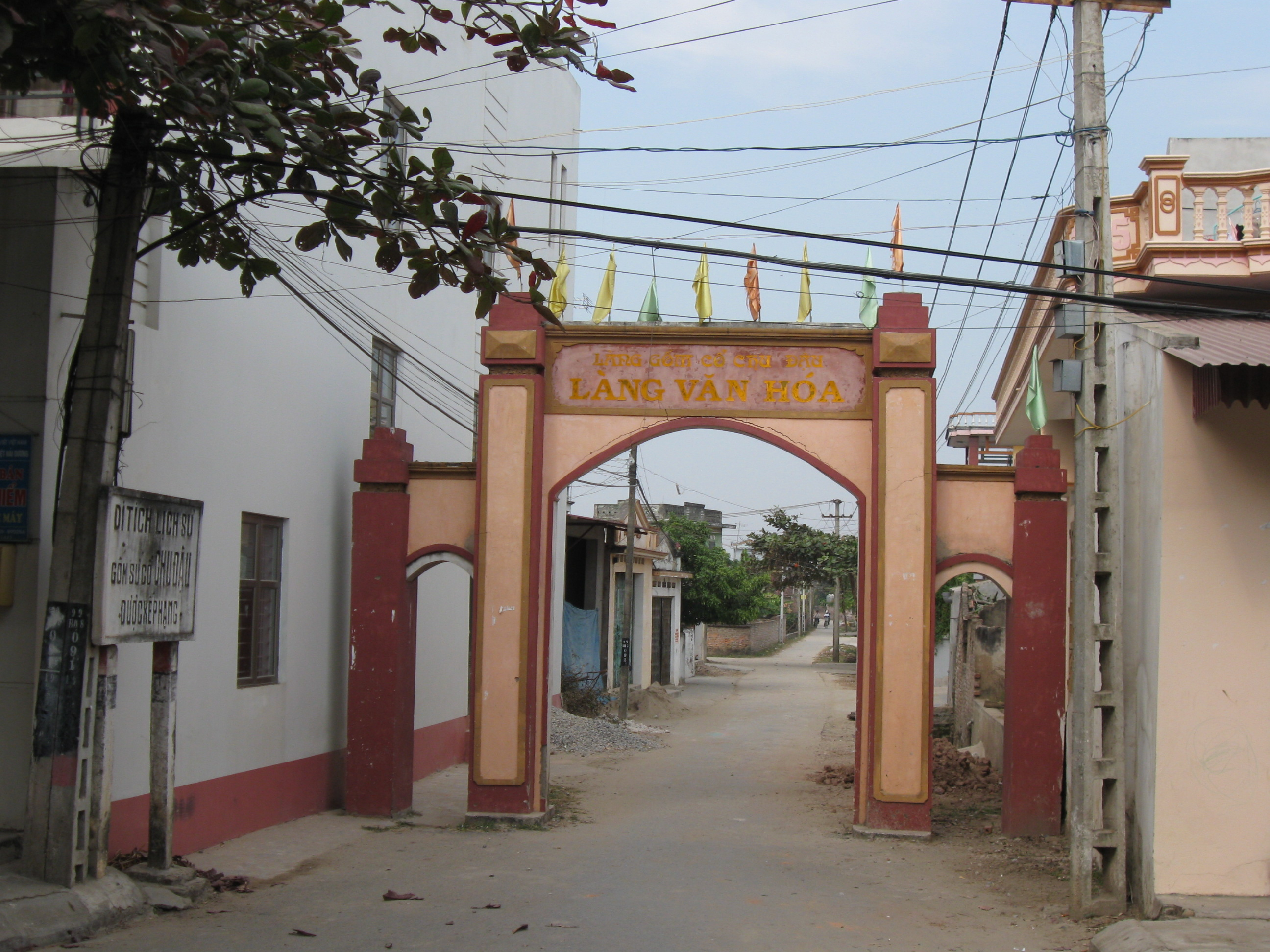
Chu Đậu ancient pottery village gate

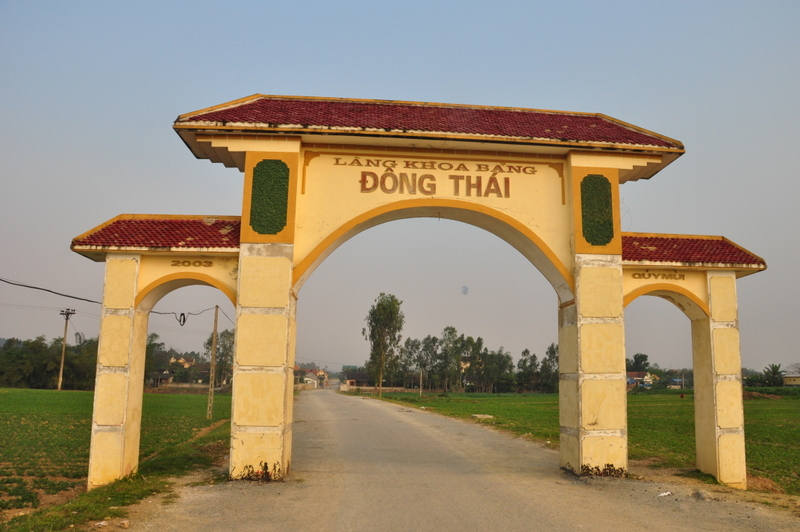
Đông Thái village gate

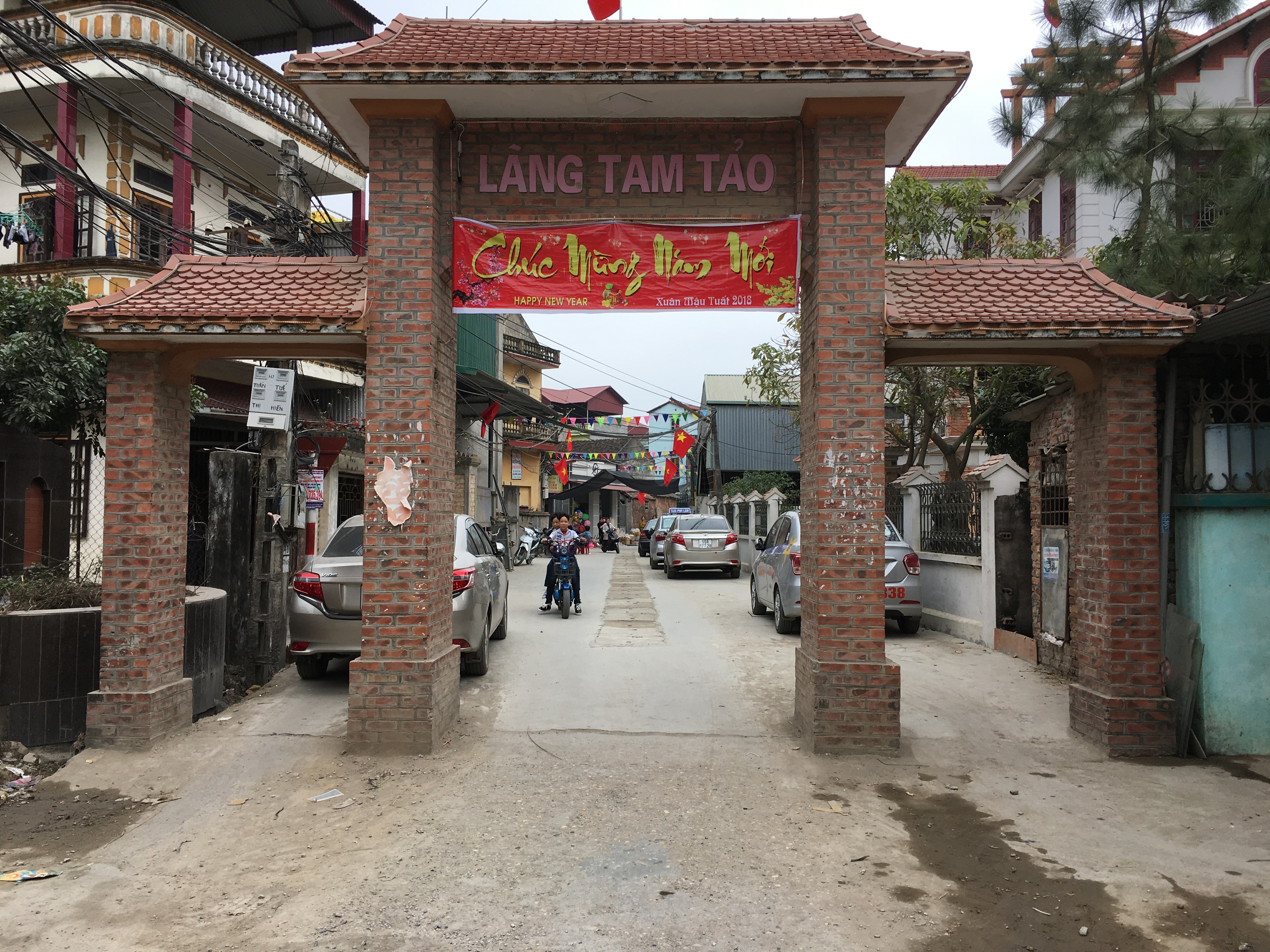
Tam Tảo village gate

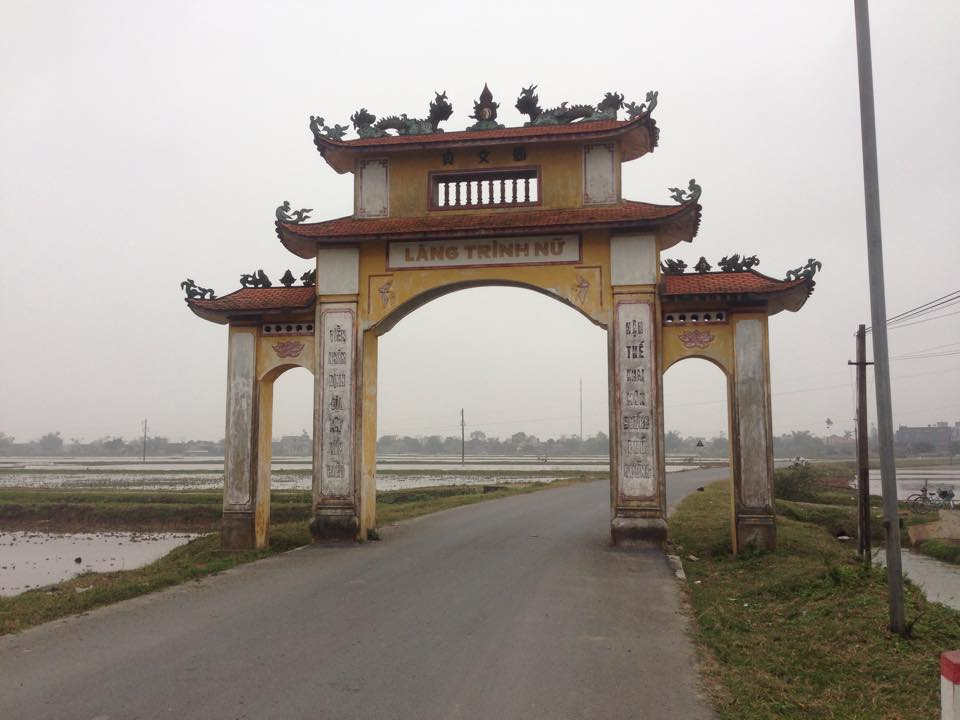
Trinh Nữ village gate, Ninh Bình

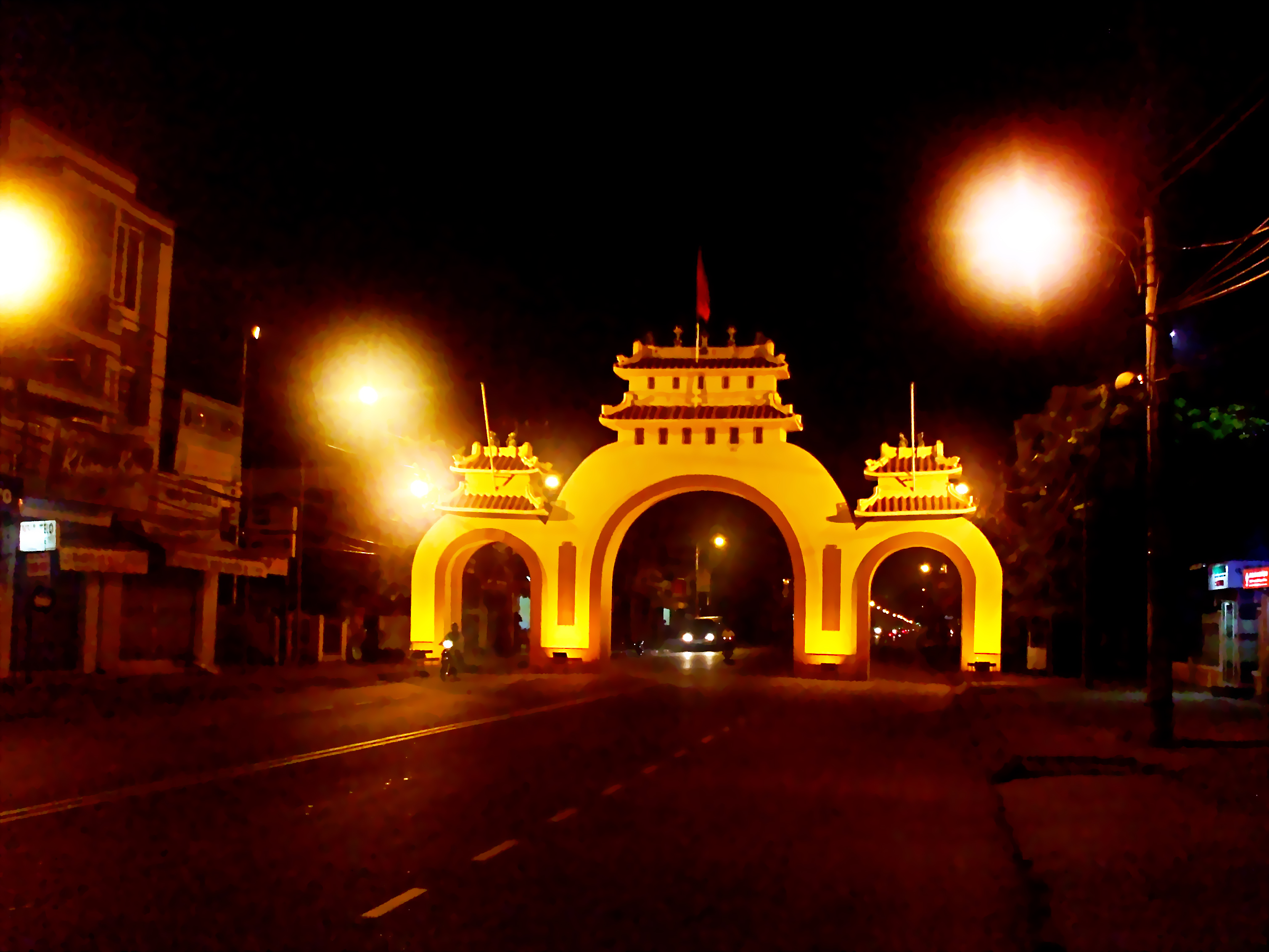
Welcome gate in the form of Tam quan in Rạch Giá city

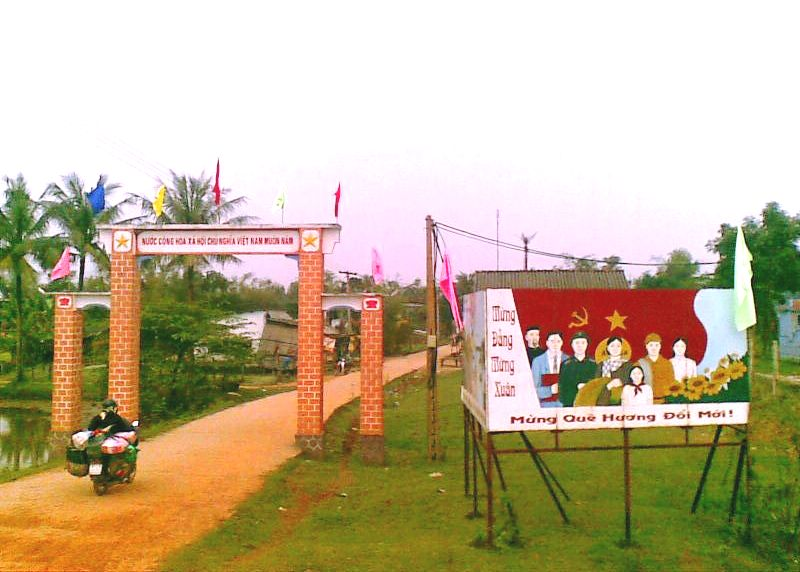
Welcome gate in Mai Xá village

== See also ==
- Trụ biểu, in Vietnamese temple architecture
- Paifang, in Chinese temple architecture
- Shanmen, in Chinese Buddhist temple architecture
- Torii, in Japanese temple architecture
- Hongsalmun, in Korean temple architecture
- Iljumun, in Korean temple architecture
- Torana, in Indian temple architecture

== Sources ==
- Nguyễn Bá Lăng. Vietnamese Buddhist Architecture Vol. II. Paris: Nguyễn Bá Lăng, 2001.
