= List of Buddhist temples in Vietnam =

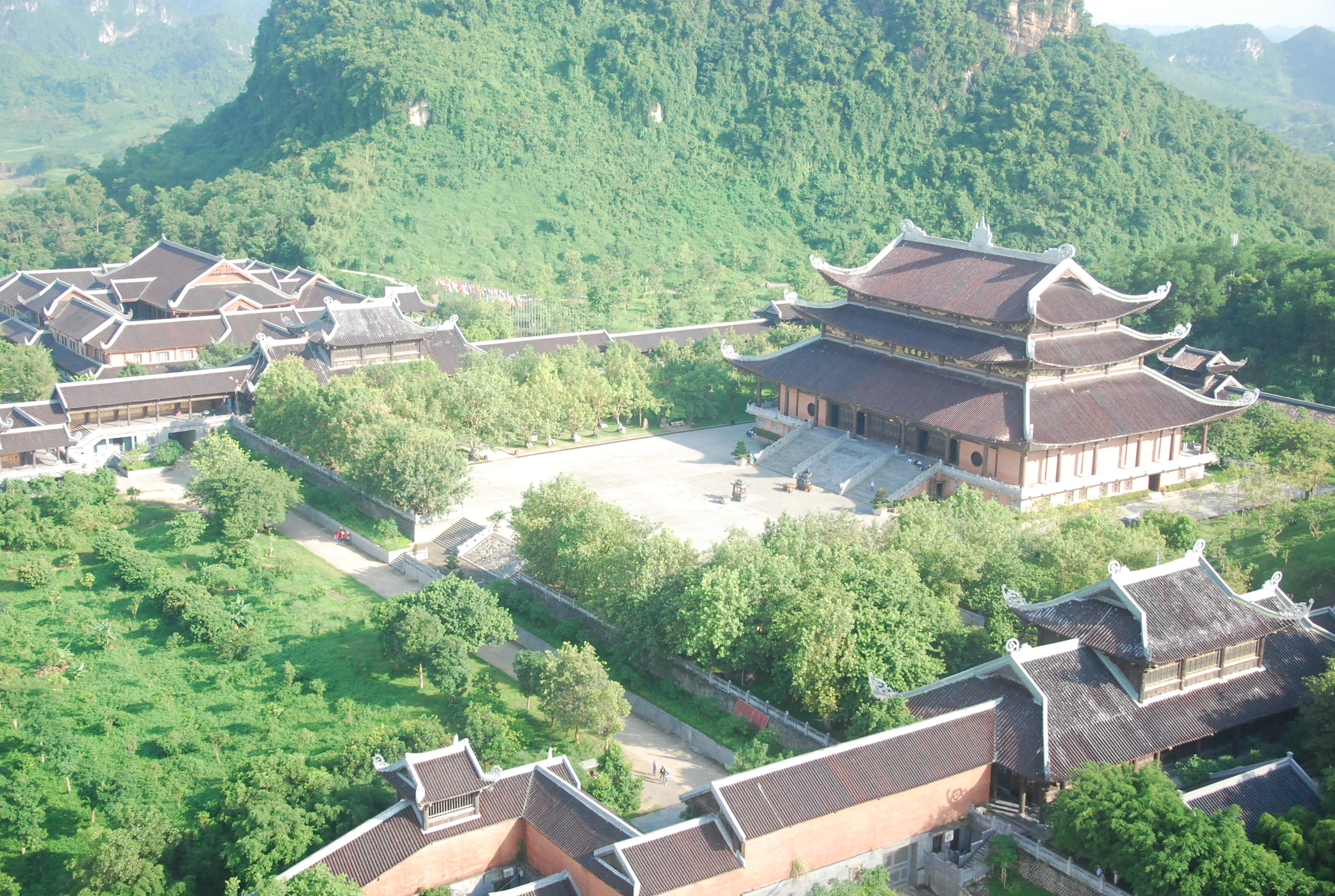
Bái Đính Temple in Ninh Bình Province – the second largest complex of Buddhist temples in Vietnam

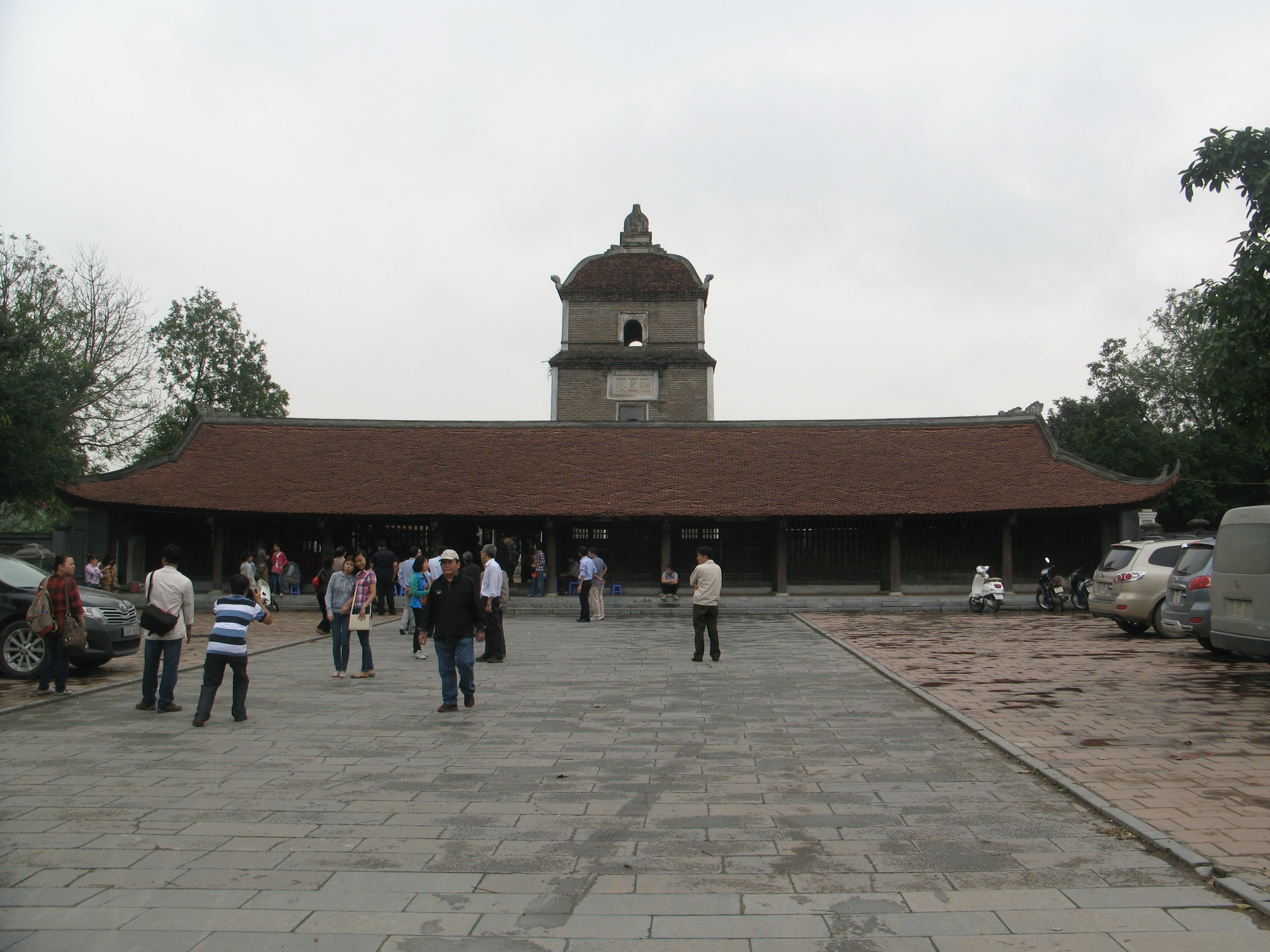
Dâu Temple in Bắc Ninh Province is the oldest Buddhist temple in Vietnam

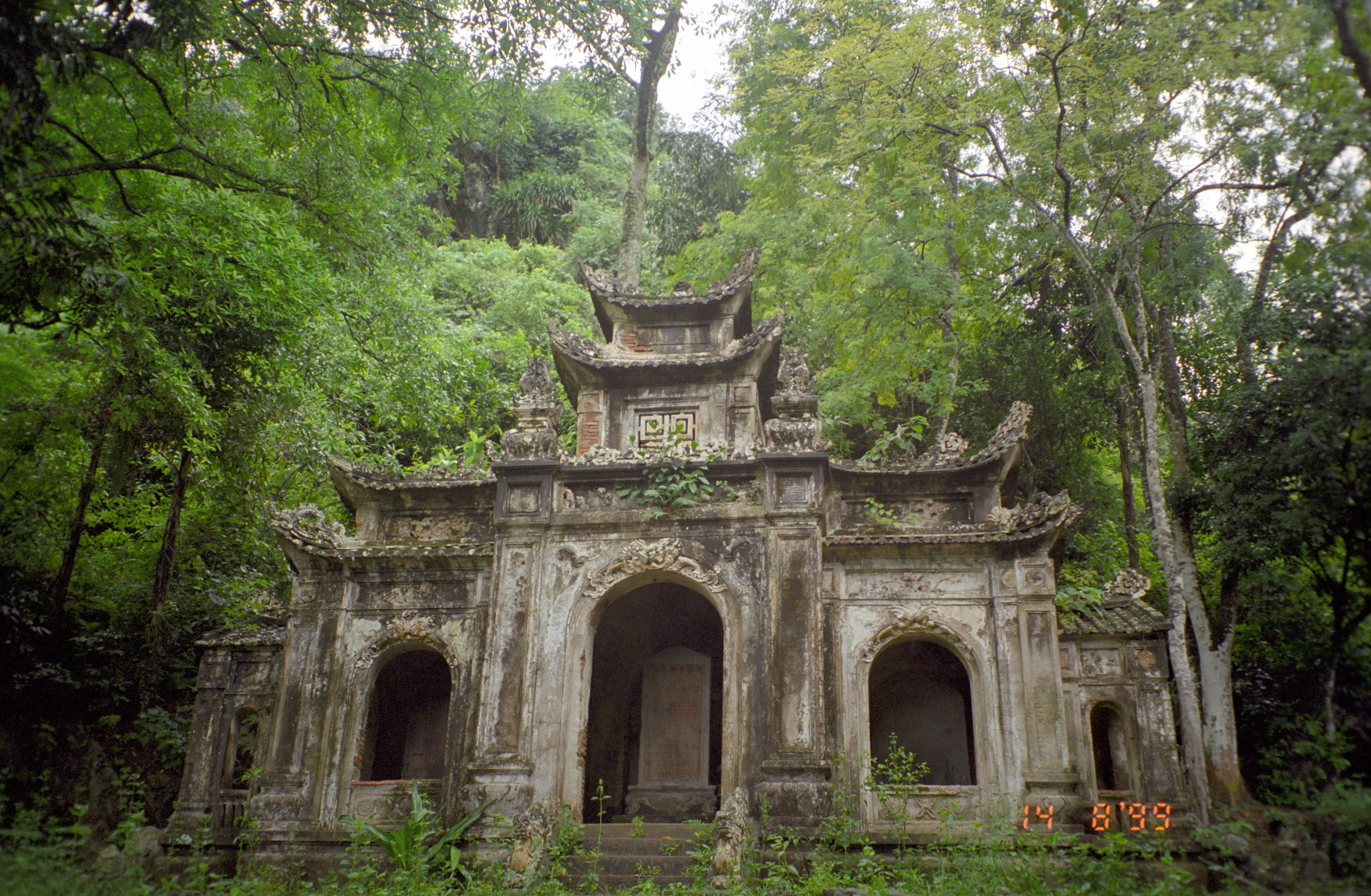
A Tam quan in Hương Temple

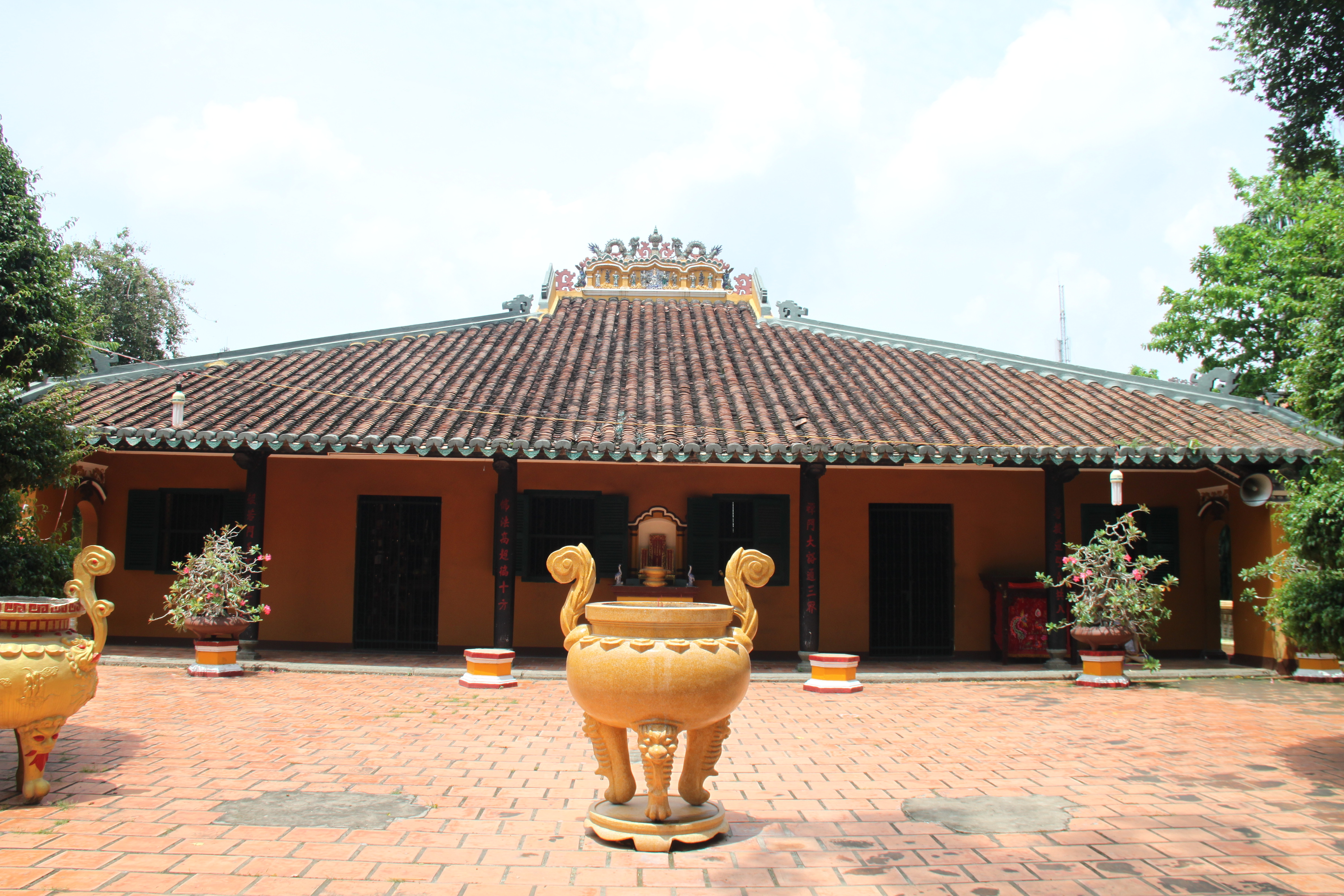
Giác Lâm Temple - An ancient temple in Ho Chi Minh city

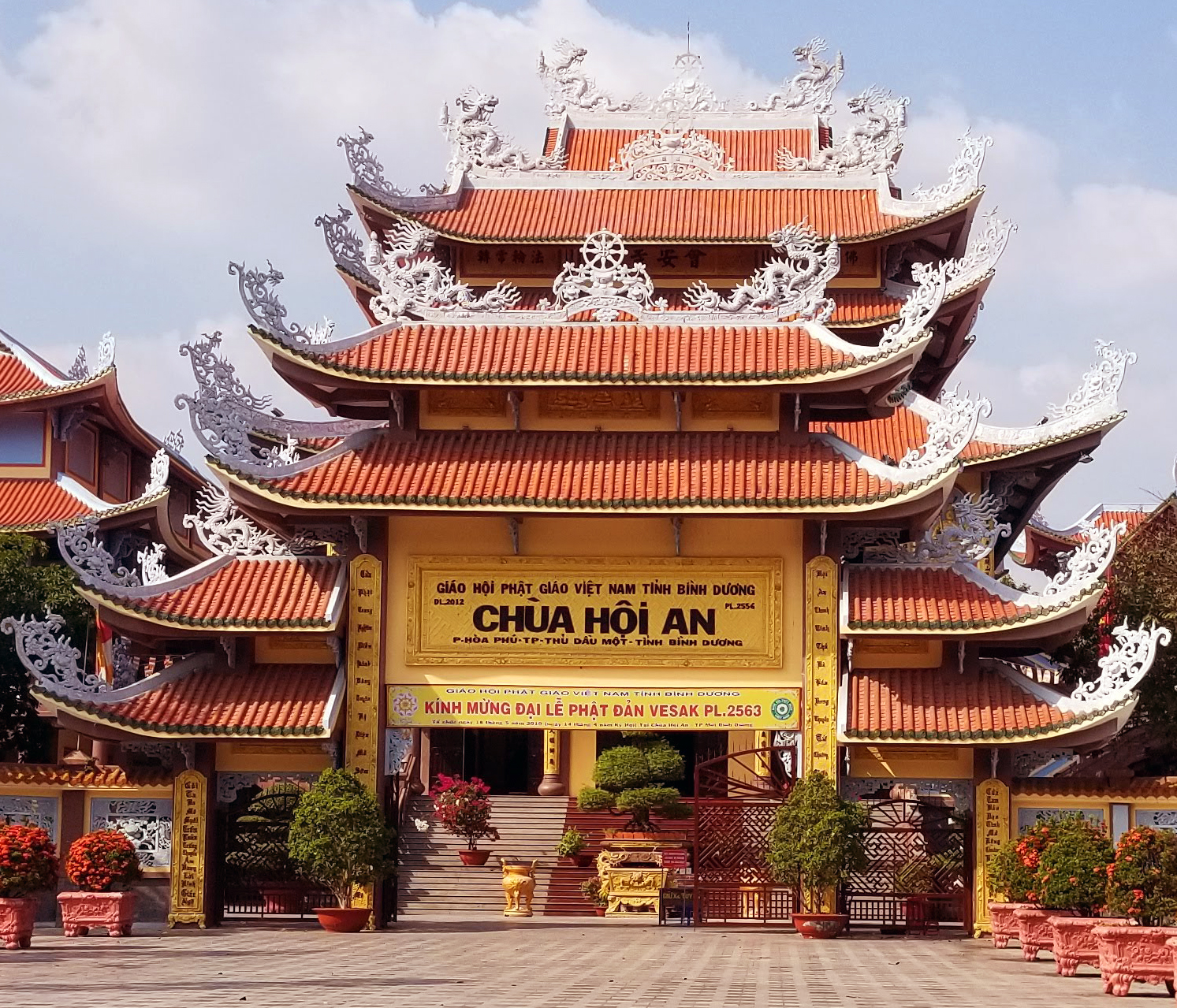
A Tam quan of Hội An Temple, Bình Dương

This is a list of Buddhist temples, monasteries, stupas, and pagodas in Vietnam for which there are Wikipedia articles, sorted by location.

== An Giang ==
- Phước Điền Temple
- Tây An Temple

== Bắc Ninh ==
- Bút Tháp Temple
- Dâu Temple
- Phật Tích Temple

== Bình Định ==
- Thập Tháp Di-Đà Temple

== Bình Dương ==
- Hội Khánh Temple

== Bình Thuận ==
- Tà Cú Pagoda (Tà Cú Mountain)

== Đà Lạt ==
- Linh Sơn Temple
- Trúc Lâm Temple

== Đồng Nai ==
- Bửu Phong Temple

== Hà Nội ==
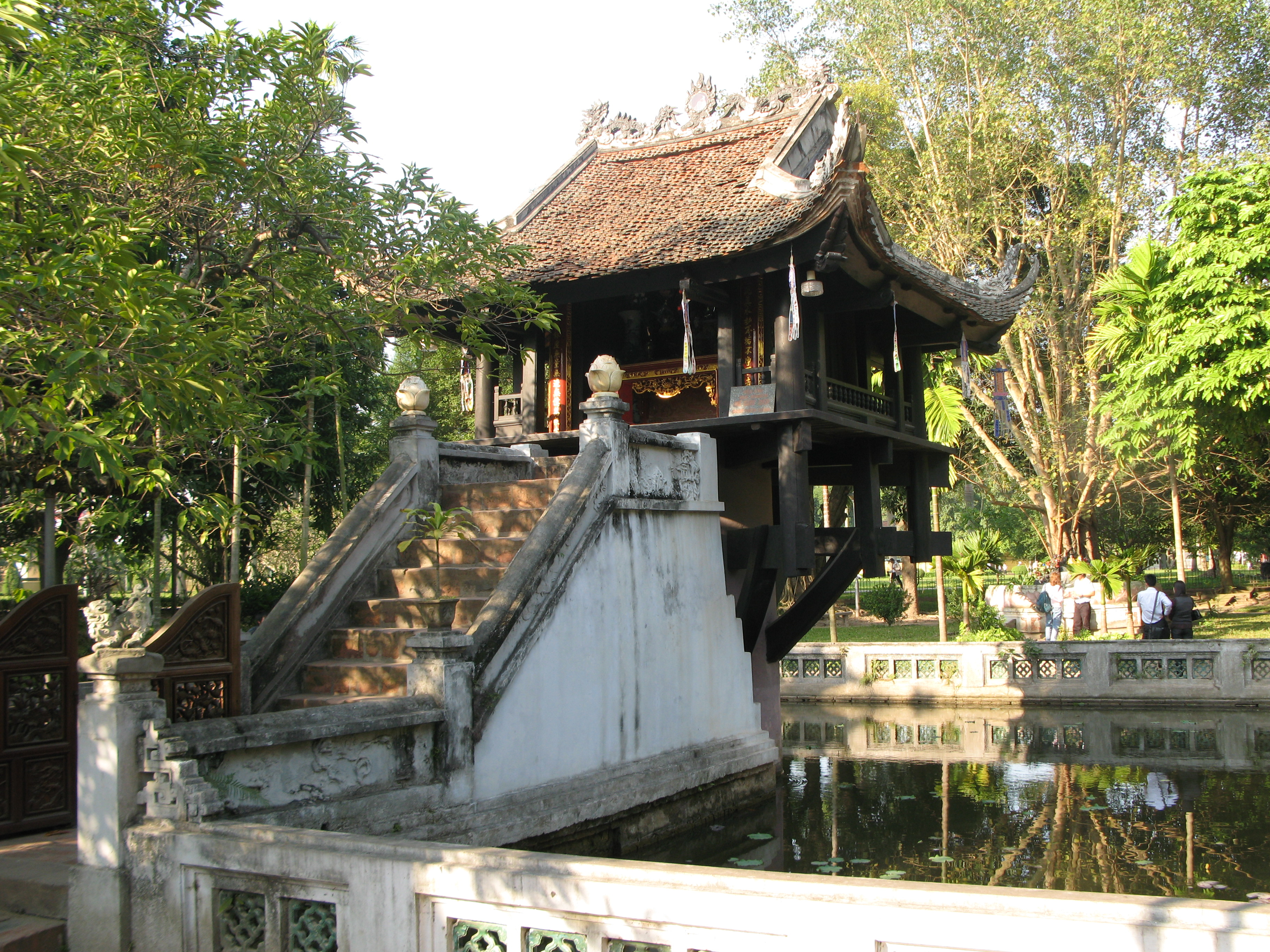
One Pillar Pagoda in Hanoi

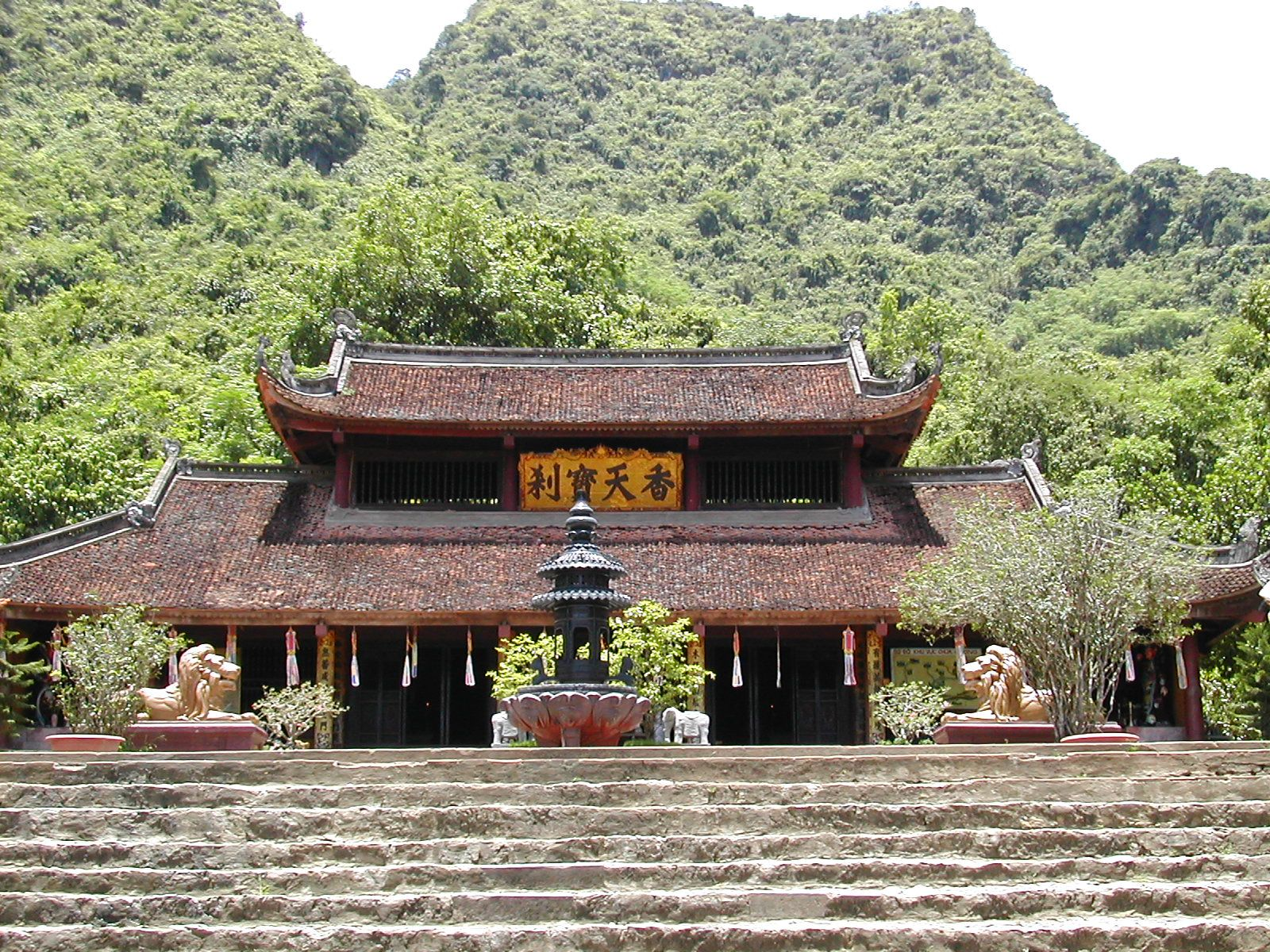
Hương Temple in Hanoi

- Láng Temple
- One Pillar Pagoda
- Perfume Temple
- Quán Sứ Temple
- Thầy Temple
- Trấn Quốc Pagoda
- Kim Liên Temple

== Hồ Chí Minh City (Sài Gòn) ==
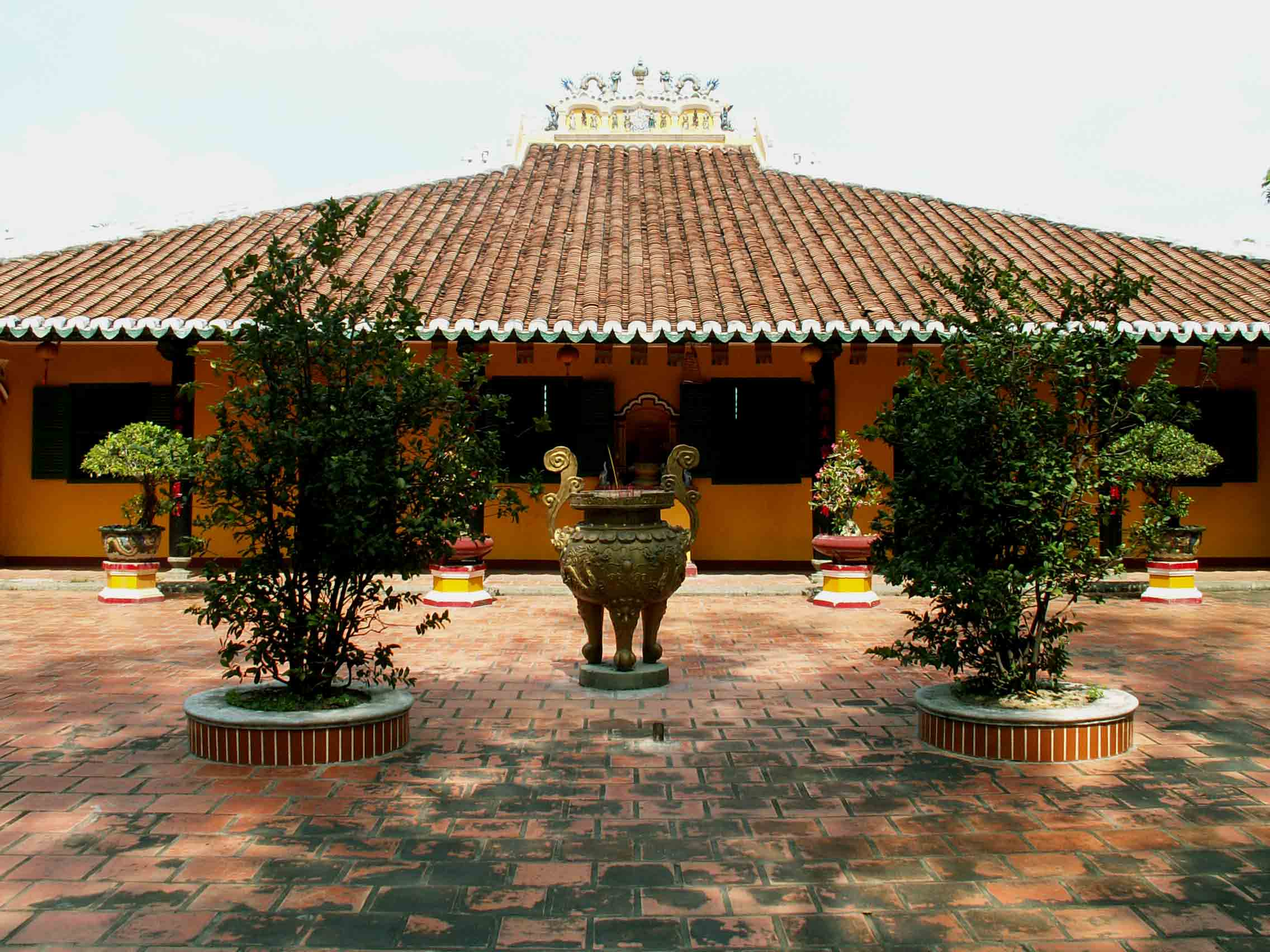
Giác Lâm Temple in HCMC

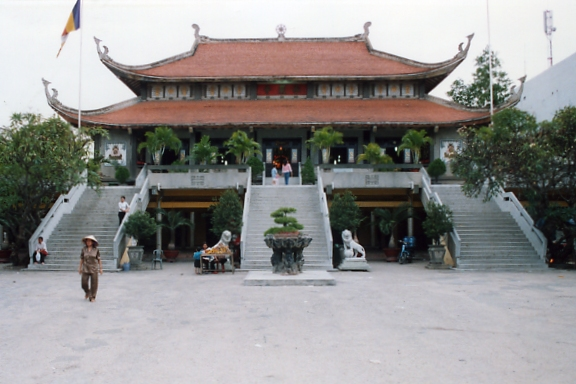
Vĩnh Nghiêm Pagoda in Ho Chi Minh City

- Ấn Quang Temple
- Giác Lâm Temple
- Hoằng Pháp Temple
- Quan Âm Pagoda
- Thiên Hậu Temple
- Tịnh Xá Trung Tâm
- Vạn Hạnh Zen Temple
- Việt Nam Quốc Tự
- Vĩnh Nghiêm Pagoda
- Xá Lợi Pagoda
- Thái Bình Temple: 449 Nơ Trang Long Street, Ward 13, Bình Thạnh District; now is Bình Lợi Trung, Hồ Chí Minh City
- Bát Nhã Temple: 550 Nơ Trang Long Street, Ward 13, Bình Thạnh District
- Phước Thành Temple: 2/3 Nơ Trang Long Street, Ward 13, Bình Thạnh District
- Diệu Pháp Temple: Alley 106/47/9 Bình Lợi, Ward 13, Bình Thạnh District
- Minh Hòa Temple: 35 Tân Cảng Street, Ward 25, Bình Thạnh District; now is Thạnh Mỹ Tây, Ho Chi Minh City

== Huế ==
Thiên Mụ Temple in Huế

- Báo Quốc Temple
- Diệu Đế Temple
- Quốc Ân Temple
- Thiên Mụ Temple
- Thuyền Tôn Temple
- Từ Đàm Temple
- Phổ Lại Temple

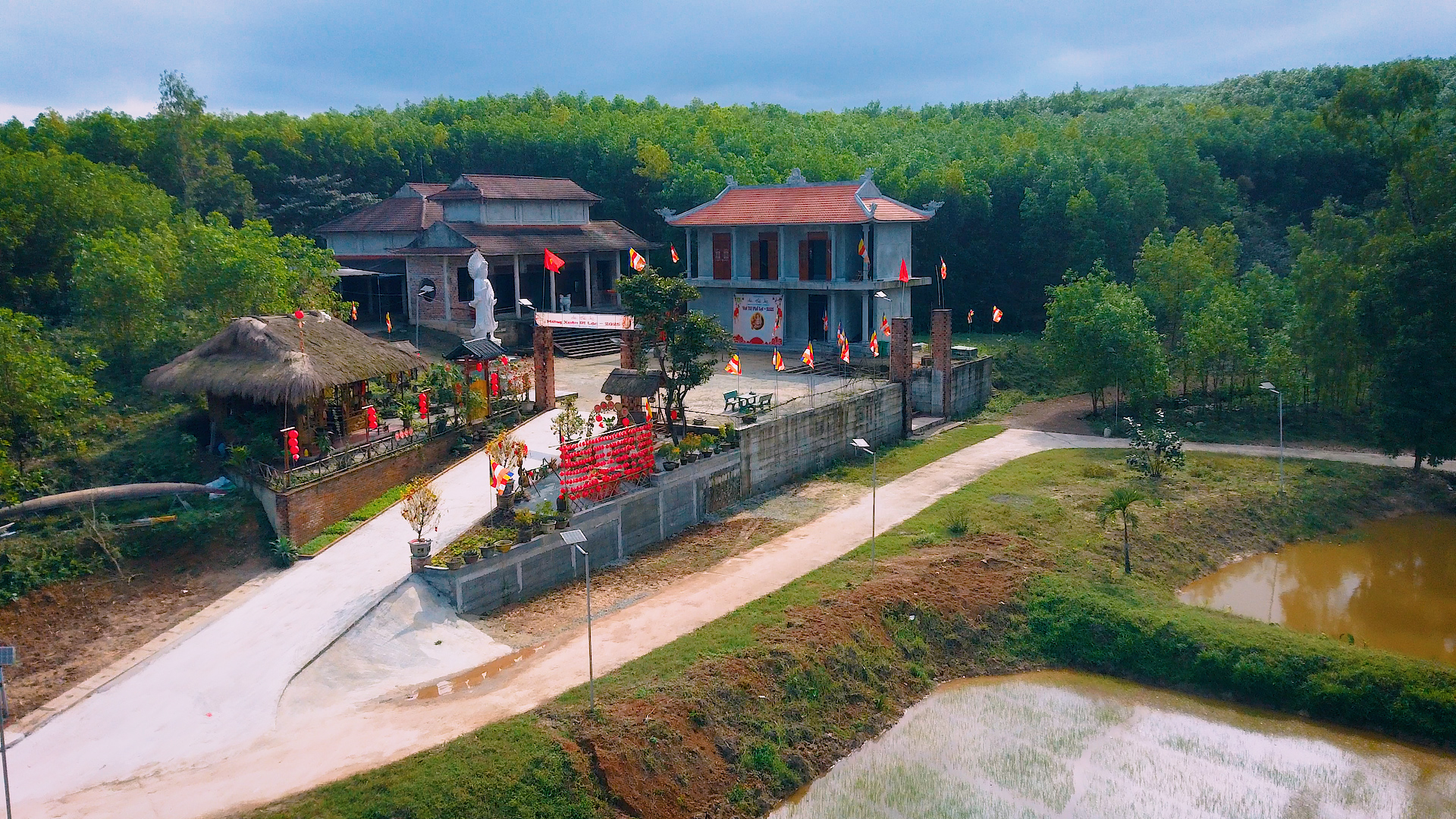
Chùa Phổ Lại in Phong Thái Ward, Huế City, Vietnam

== Hưng Yên ==
- Chuông Temple

== Kiên Giang ==
- Sắc Tứ Tam Bảo Temple

== Ninh Bình ==
- Bái Đính Temple

== Nam Định ==
- Phổ Minh Temple

== Nha Trang ==
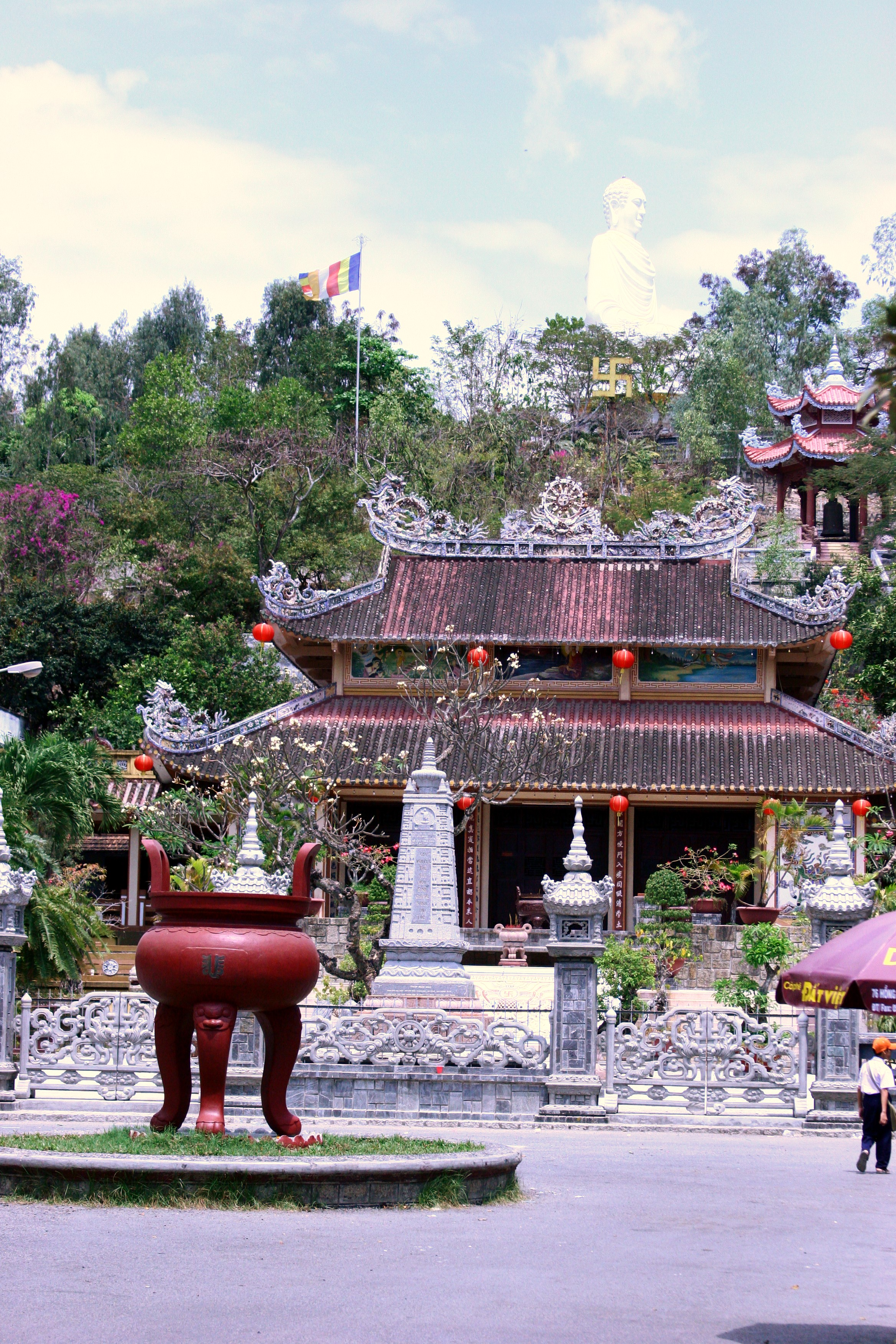
Long Sơn Temple in Nha Trang

- Long Sơn Temple

== Phú Yên ==
- Phước Sơn Temple
- Thuyền Tôn Temple

== Quảng Bình ==
- Hoằng Phúc Temple

== Quảng Ngãi ==
- Thiên Ấn Temple

== Sóc Trăng ==
- Kh'Leang Temple

== Thái Bình ==
- Keo Temple

== Thừa Thiên-Huế ==
- Huyen Khong Son Thuong Monastery

== Tiền Giang ==
- Vĩnh Tràng Temple

== Vĩnh Phúc ==
- Bình Sơn Pagoda

== Vũng Tàu ==
- Thích Ca Phật Đài
- Kiều Đàm Ni Viện - Nun Monastry [H3P9+W27, Tôn Thất Tùng Street, Phú Mỹ, Tân Thành, Bà Rịa - Vũng Tàu, Vietnam]
- Từ Nhãn Temple [25 Tôn Thất Tùng Street, Phú Mỹ, Tân Thành, Bà Rịa - Vũng Tàu, Vietnam]
- Quan Âm Temple [Tôn Thất Tùng Street, Phú Mỹ, Tân Thành, Bà Rịa - Vũng Tàu, Vietnam]
- Bát Nhã Temple [ 939C+P78, Ward 6, Bà Rịa - Vũng Tàu, Vietnam]
- Niết Bàn Temple [Vạn Hạnh, Phú Mỹ, Bà Rịa - Vũng Tàu, Vietnam]
- Hương Tích Temple [ 1685 Độc Lập Street, Phú Mỹ, Tân Thành, Bà Rịa - Vũng Tàu, Vietnam]
- Phổ Hiền Temple [202 Tôn Thất Tùng Street, Phú Mỹ, Tân Thành, Bà Rịa - Vũng Tàu, Vietnam]
- Phước Bửu Temple [G9HR+G93, QL55, Phước Thuận, Xuyên Mộc, Bà Rịa - Vũng Tàu, Vietnam]

== See also ==
- Vietnamese architecture
- Buddhism in Vietnam
- List of Buddhist temples
