= Tà Cú Pagoda =

Temple on Tà Cú mountain, Vietnam

Coordinates: 10.8281°N 107.8828°E

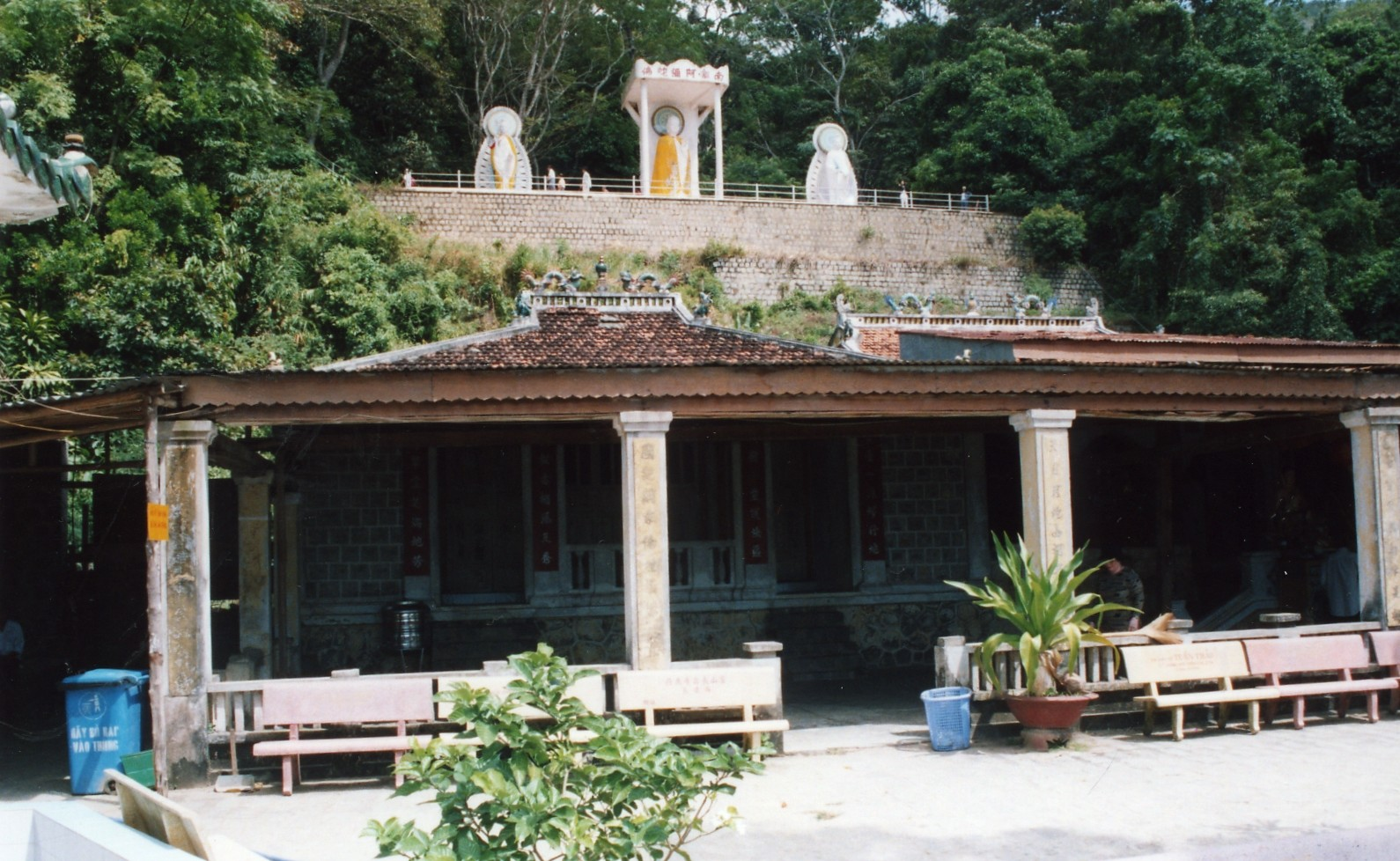
Entrance to Tà Cú Pagoda

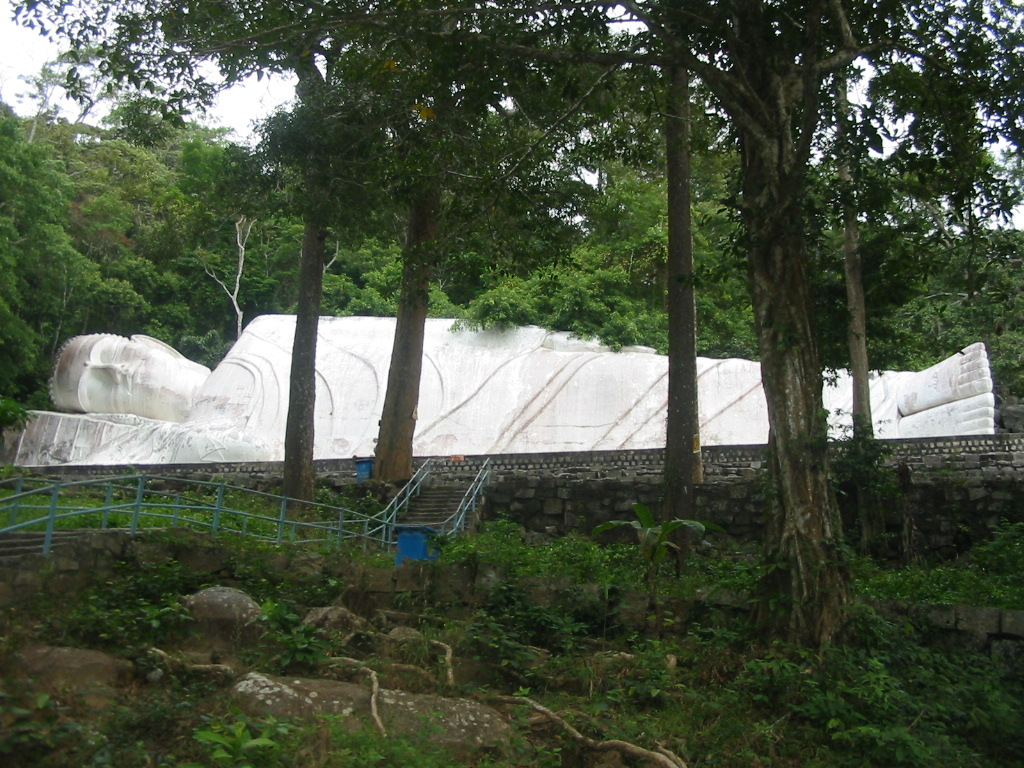
The Reclining Buddha

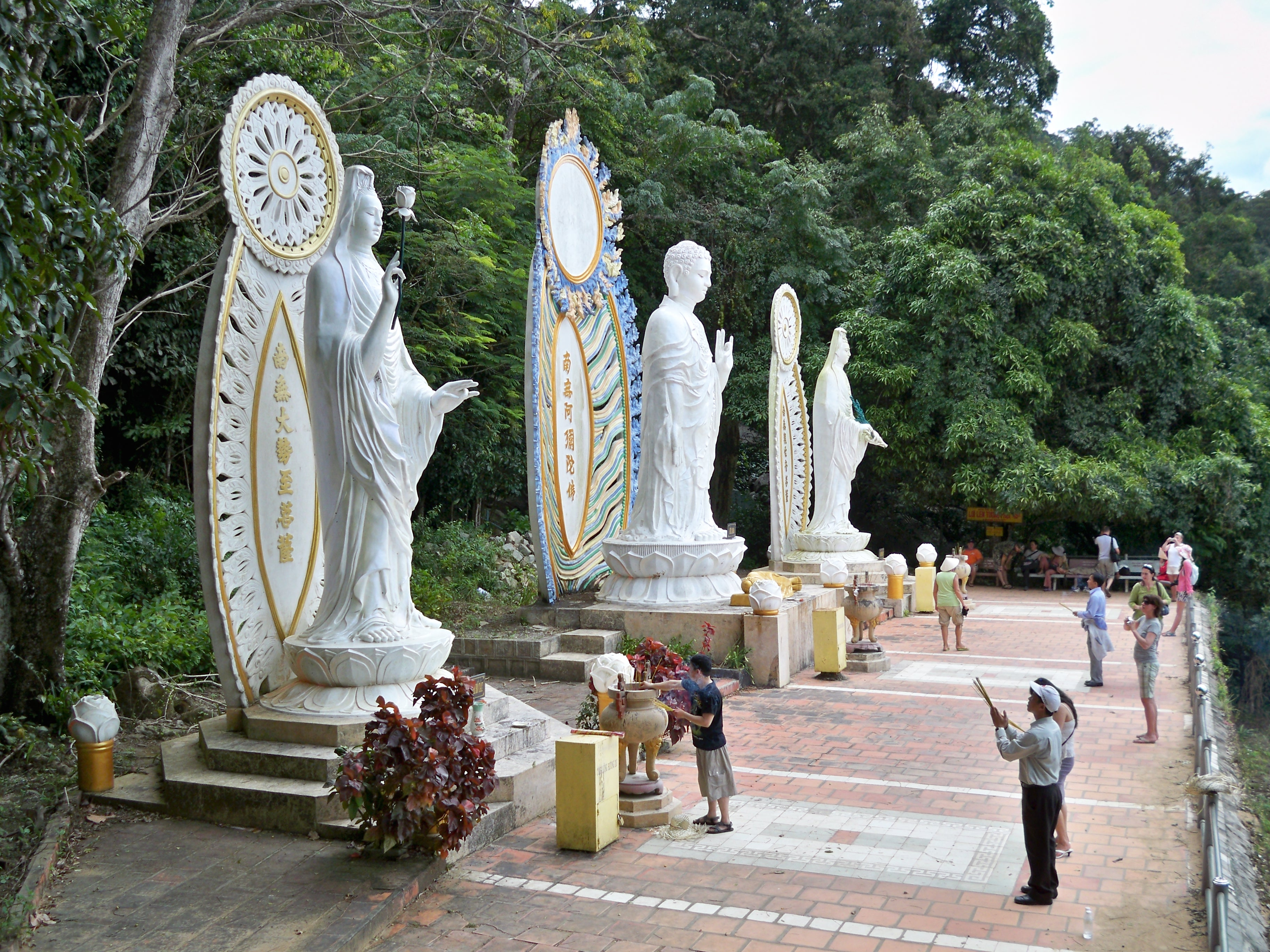
Statues

Mount Tà Cú Pagoda (Chùa núi Tà Cú) is a temple on Tà Cú mountain, Hàm Thuận Nam District, Bình Thuận Province, Vietnam.

The statue of Reclining Buddha of Tà Cú is the longest reclining Buddha statue in Vietnam, and depicts the Buddha entering paranirvana. It is forty-nine metres long and eleven metres tall. The statue was begun in 1963, being finally completed in 1966, and has become a favourite hotspot for tourists. It is located in Linh Sơn Trường Thọ pagoda,
