= Linh Sơn Temple =

Buddhist temple in Vietnam

Coordinates: 11°57′00″N 108°26′13″E

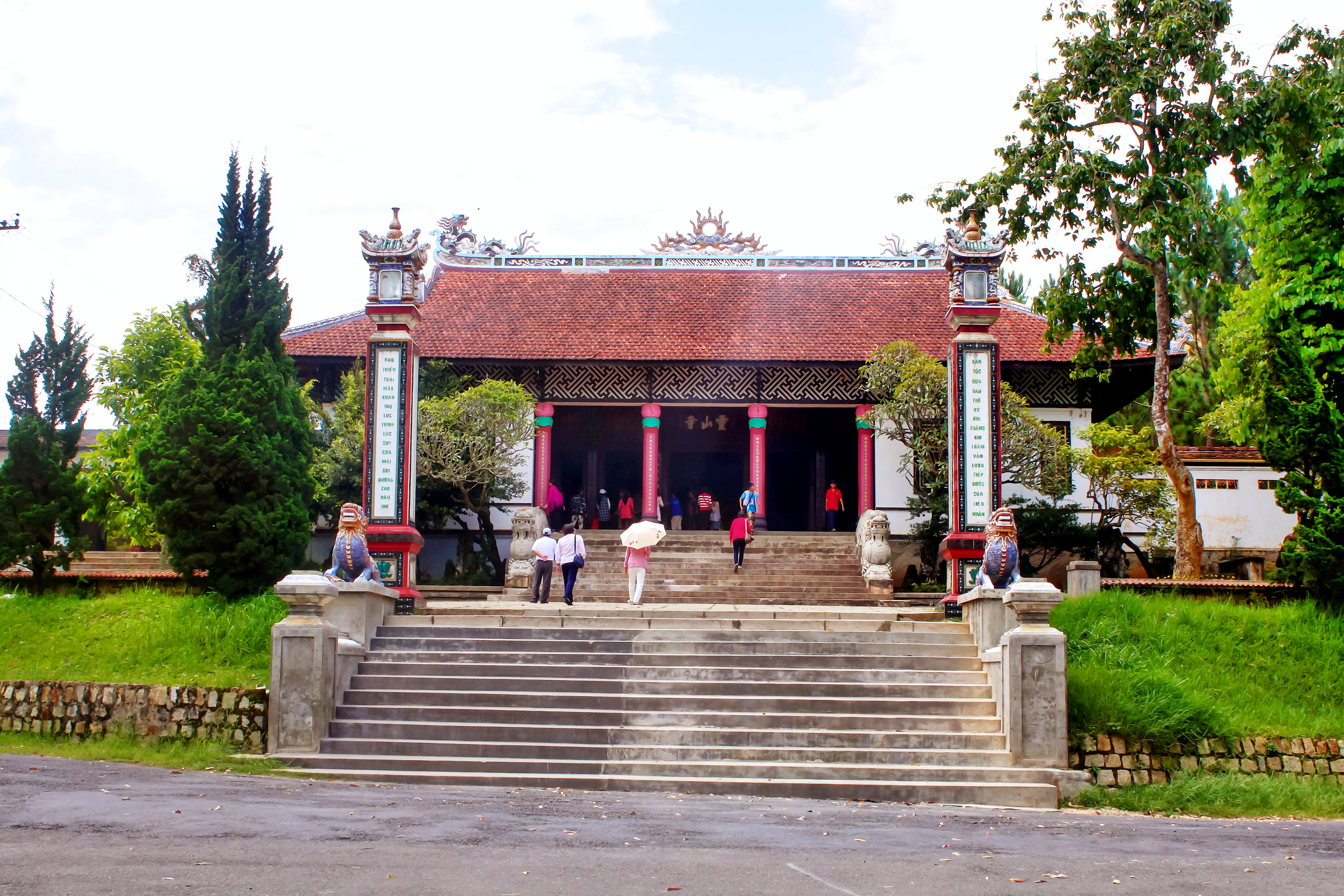
Main hall of Linh Sơn Temple

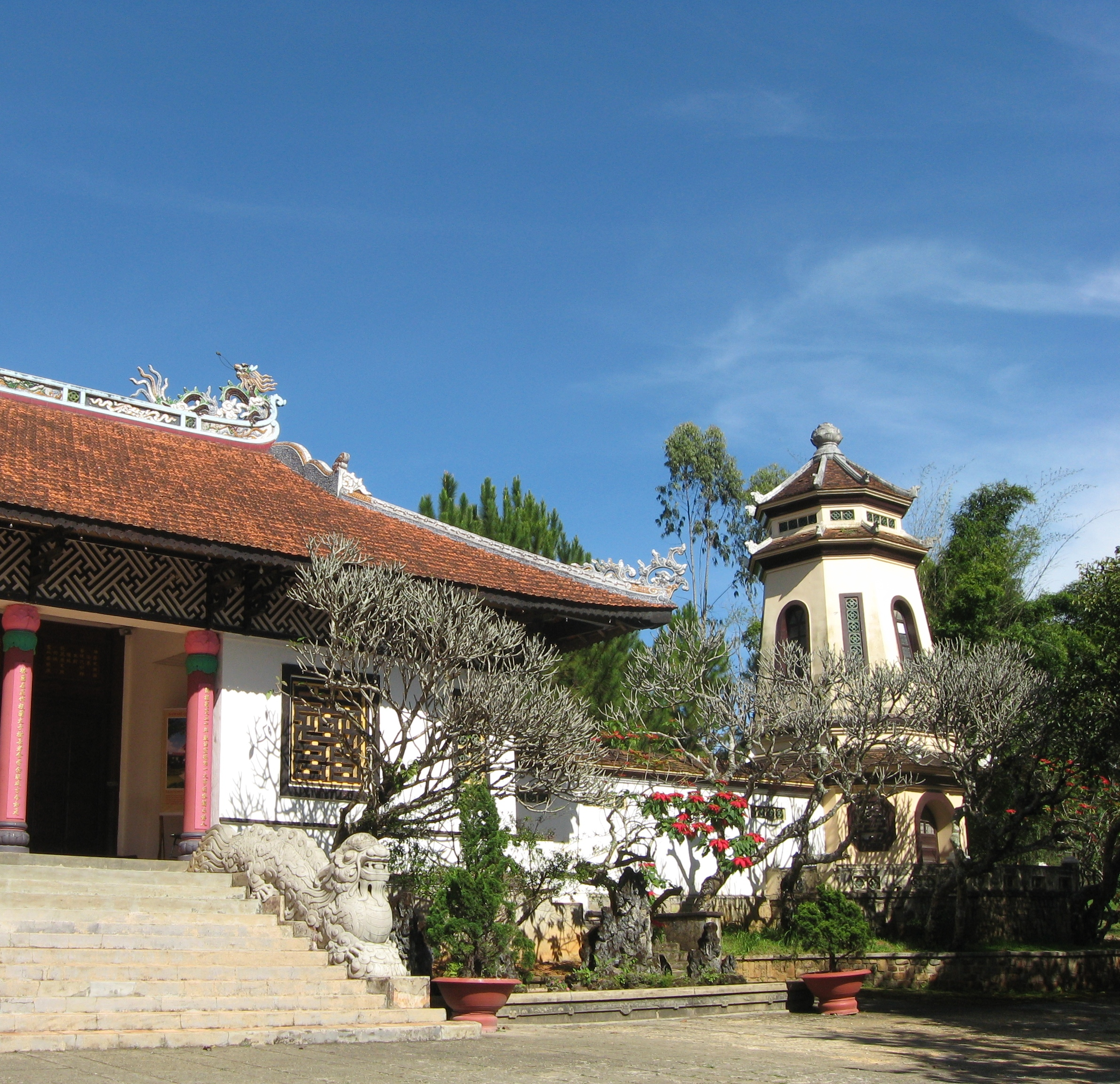
The Linh Sơn Temple

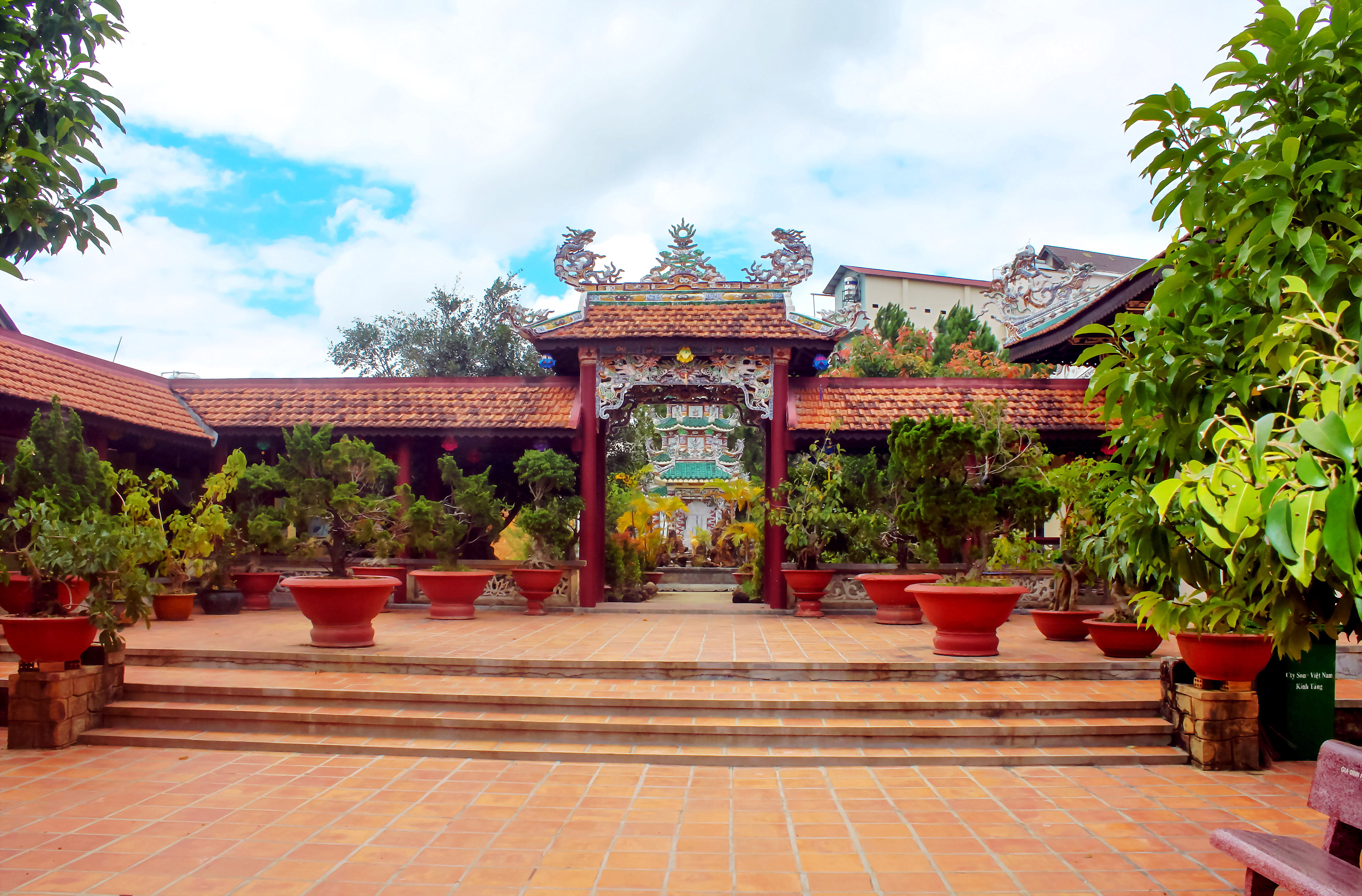
Linh Sơn tomb tower area

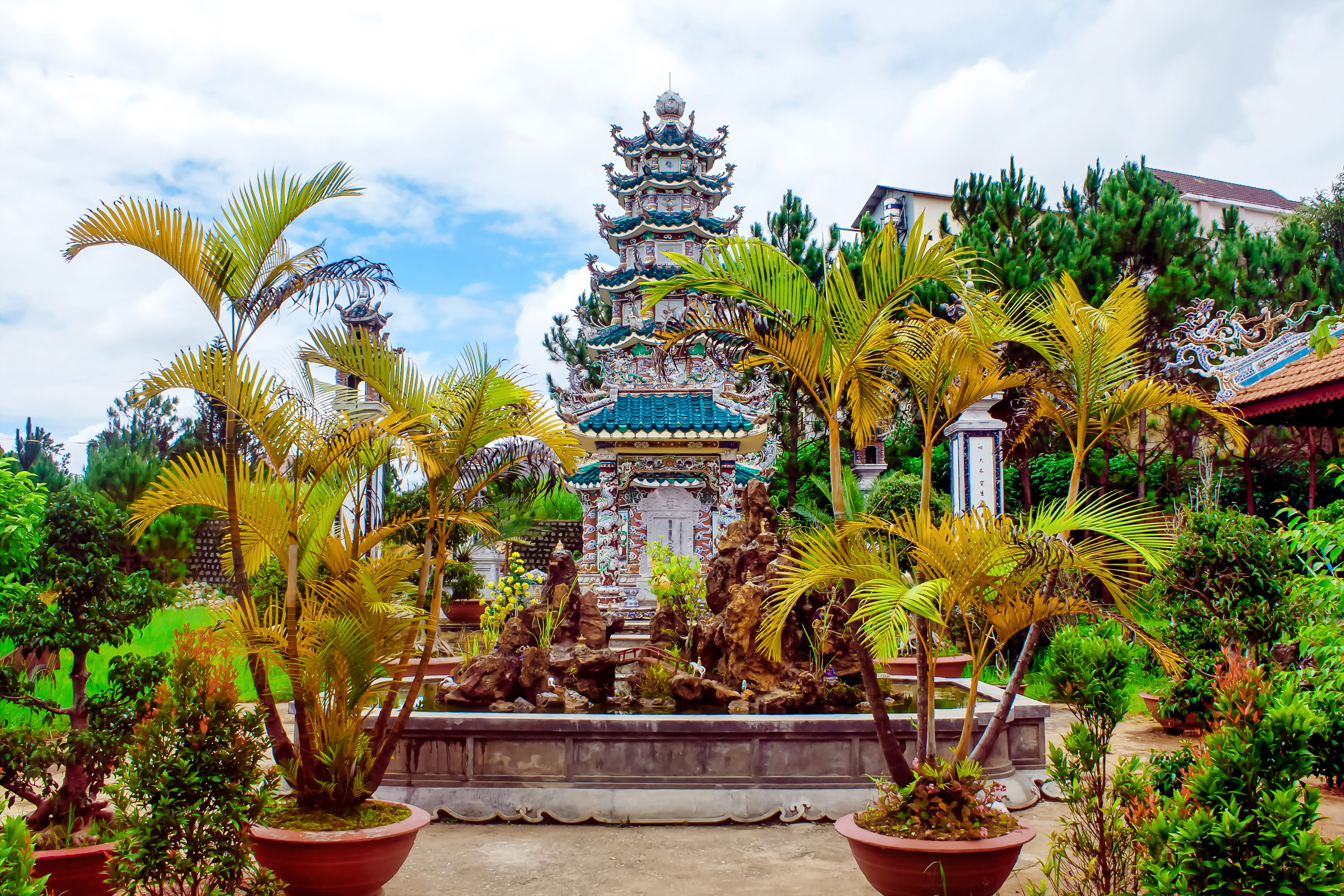
Tomb tower

Linh Sơn Temple (Chùa Linh Sơn) is a notable Buddhist temple in the resort town of Đà Lạt, Vietnam.

Linh Sơn Temple is located on top of a small hill at 120 Nguyễn Văn Trỗi Street, in the second ward, approximately 700 m northwest of the centre of Da Lat. The temple was built starting in 1938 and it was completed and opened in 1940. The building was funded by the general public, but the largest financial donations were from two lay Buddhists by the names of Võ Đình Dung and Nguyễn Văn Tiến.

Upon entering the temple, a visitor is confronted by the rows of pine trees. Directly at the front of the courtyard is a statue of the bodhisattva Avalokiteshvara, the bodhisattva of compassion, so stands on a lotus seat. On the left of the statues is a stupa, of octagonal stupa, that stands three storeys high for a total of 4 m in height. On the right hand side, in the middle of a green patch of lawn is a pond which is adorned with clear water, flowers and the sight of goldfish swimming. The area is further adorned by other plants. On both sides is a twelve step entrance up into the main ceremonial hall, which is guarded by two statues of dragons, which represent the protection of the dharma, the teachings of Gautama Buddha.

The temple is built in a classical Asian style of architecture, and is of a simple layout and model. At the two corners of the temples, are dragon statues, staring at the roof of the temple. There are various quotations displayed in various places in the temple.

In the centre of the main ceremonial hall, there is statue of Gautama Buddha, made of bronze, seated on a lotus. The statue weighs 1250 kg. The statues was cast in 1952 and was inaugurated by the Buddhist Patriarch of Vietnam, Thích Tịnh Khiết.

Since the opening of the temple, the abbots have been Thích Trí Thủ (1940), Thích Diệu Hoằng (1940–1947), Thích Từ Mãn (1947–1952), Thích Bích Nguyên (1952–1964), Thích Từ Mãn (1964–).

Currently, the office of the Board of the Buddhist Association of Lâm Đồng Province is seated at the temple. Although Linh Son Pagoda lacks the historic nature of other temples in that it was only built in the 20th century, its elegant nature and aesthetic appeal has made it one of the main sights in the tourist resort town of Da Lat. The temple is particular popular among visitors, Buddhists and general tourists alike, particular in the spring.

The large bell is reputed to be made from bronze alloyed with gold, that make it too heavy for would be robbers to carry away. The temple also has a variety of tea and coffee plants, which are tended by the sangha. Around 20 monks and around half a dozen novices live at the temple.
