= Thuyền Tôn Temple =

The Thuyền Tôn Temple is a historic temple in the central Vietnamese city of Huế.

The temple was founded by Zen Master Thích Liễu Quán, who arrived north from the southern Phú Yên Province at the end of the 17th century. Thích Liễu Quán opened the Thuyền Tôn Temple in approximately 1708.

A stupa was built to inter his remains after his death. At the entrance of the stupa, the words “Đàm hoa lạc khứ hữu dư hương” are inscribed. Today, this is the only part of the original temple that remains.

The main temple has since moved to Ngũ Tây in the Thủy An ward of Huế. The current temple stands to left of Thiên Thai mountain, so it is also known by the alternative name Thiên Thai Thuyền Tôn Tự (chữ Hán: 天台禪宗寺).

In approximately the middle of the 18th century, a government official known as Mai Van Hoan had engaged in activism to raise funds to construct a temple, approximately one kilometre from the original site. The giant bell of the temple was cast during this period, with the stamp on the showing the year 1747. The temple was further renovated and expanded due to the private funding of a lady named Lê Thị Tạ in 1808.

The abbots of the newly rebuilt temple were Thích Tế Hiệp, Thích Tế Mẫn, Thích Đại Huệ, Thích Đại Nghĩa, Thích Đạo Tâm and Thích Đạo Tại, Thích Tánh Thiện, Thích Hải Nhuận, Thích Thanh Liêm, Thích Thanh Đức.

In 1937, Thích Giác Nhiên organised a major building works program for the temple. Thích Giác Nhiên was well known for his major efforts in the revival of Buddhism in the first half of the 20th century of Vietnam. He played a major role in the running of the temple and held major roles on the leadership of the United Vietnamese Buddhist Congregation until his death at the age of 102 in 1979.

The temple is known for its classical architecture and traditional layout of the altars in the temple. At the front of the main ceremonial hall is a statue of Gautama Buddha. There are statues of the Pho Hien, Van Thu Su Loi and Chuan De bodhisattvas. The temple has a ceremonial bell and wooden fish gong. There is a statue of Avalokiteśvara, flanked by Ananda and Mahākāśyapa, the personal attendant of the Buddha and the first patriarch of Buddhism respectively. There is another statue of Ksitigarbha in the temple.

Looking in from the front of the triple gate, the quarters of Thích Giác Nhiên has remained in the same state. The stupa dedicated to him is directly in front of the door of his room, against the backdrop of Thiên Thai mountain.
