= Vĩnh Nghiêm Pagoda, Ho Chi Minh City =

Pagoda in Ho Chi Minh City, Vietnam

Coordinates: 10.7904°N 106.6823°E

Vietnamese name
- Vietnamese alphabet: Chùa Vĩnh Nghiêm
- Hán-Nôm: 永嚴寺

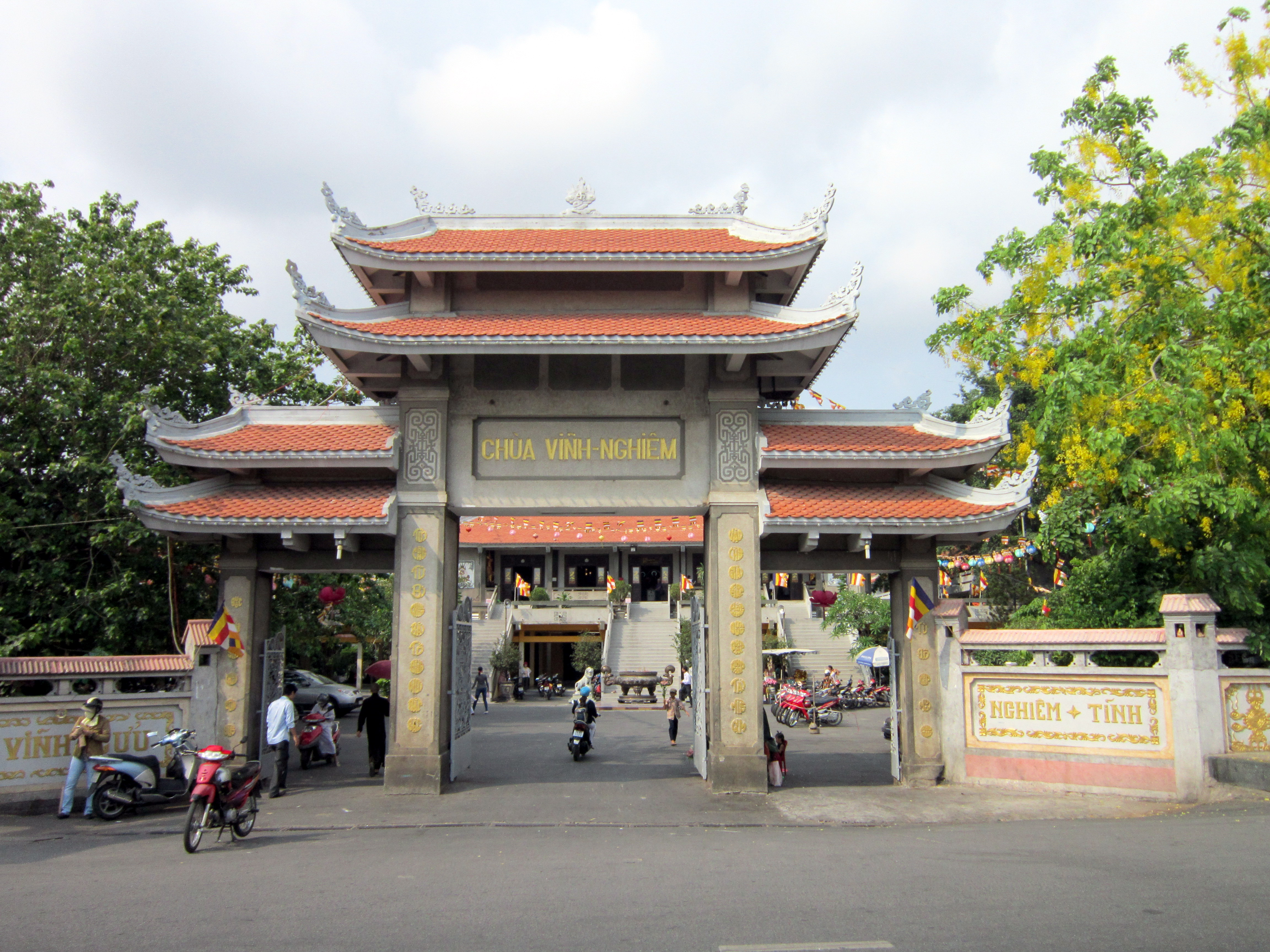
Tam quan gate at Vĩnh Nghiêm Pagoda, 2013

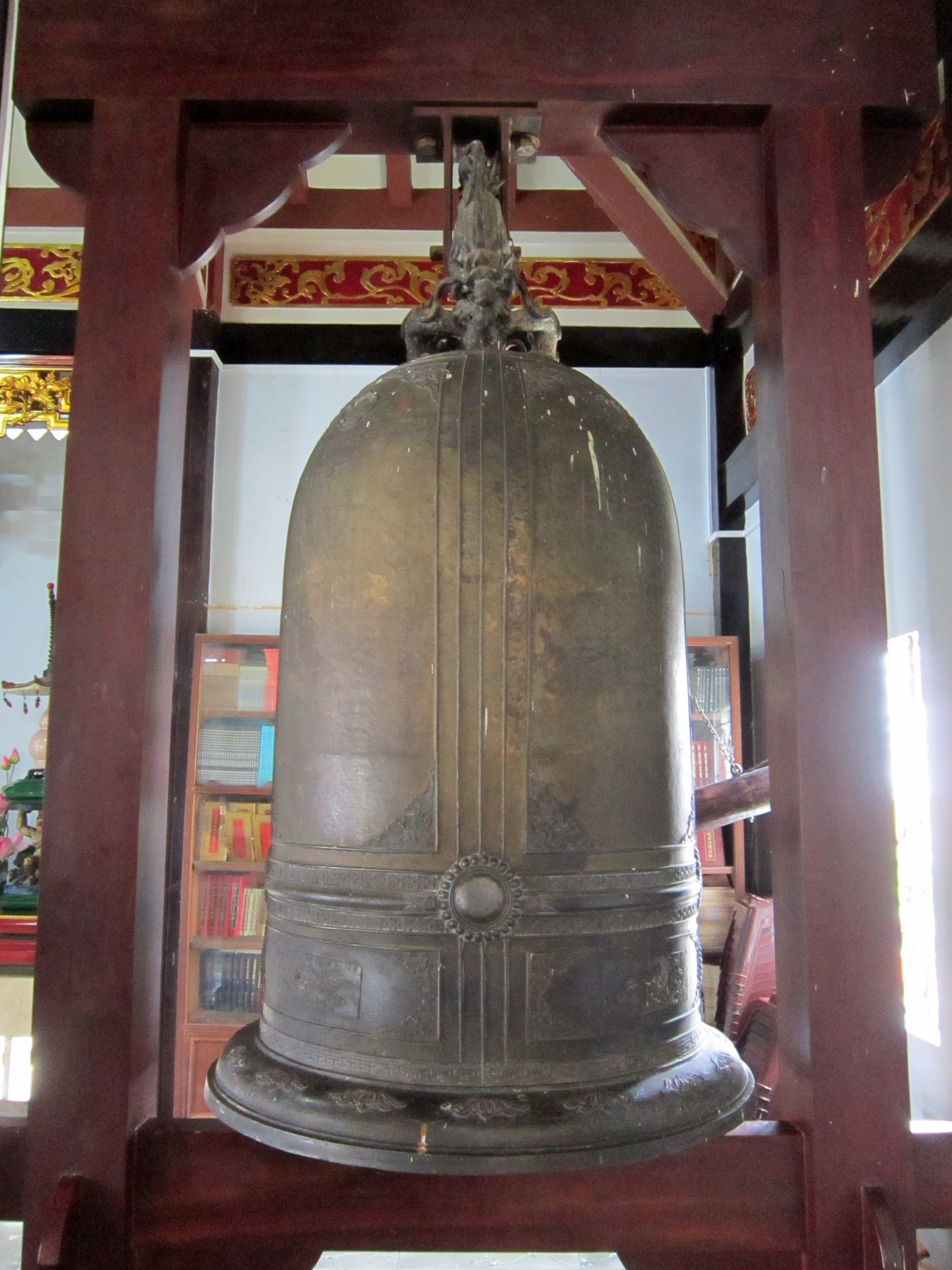
Peace Bell

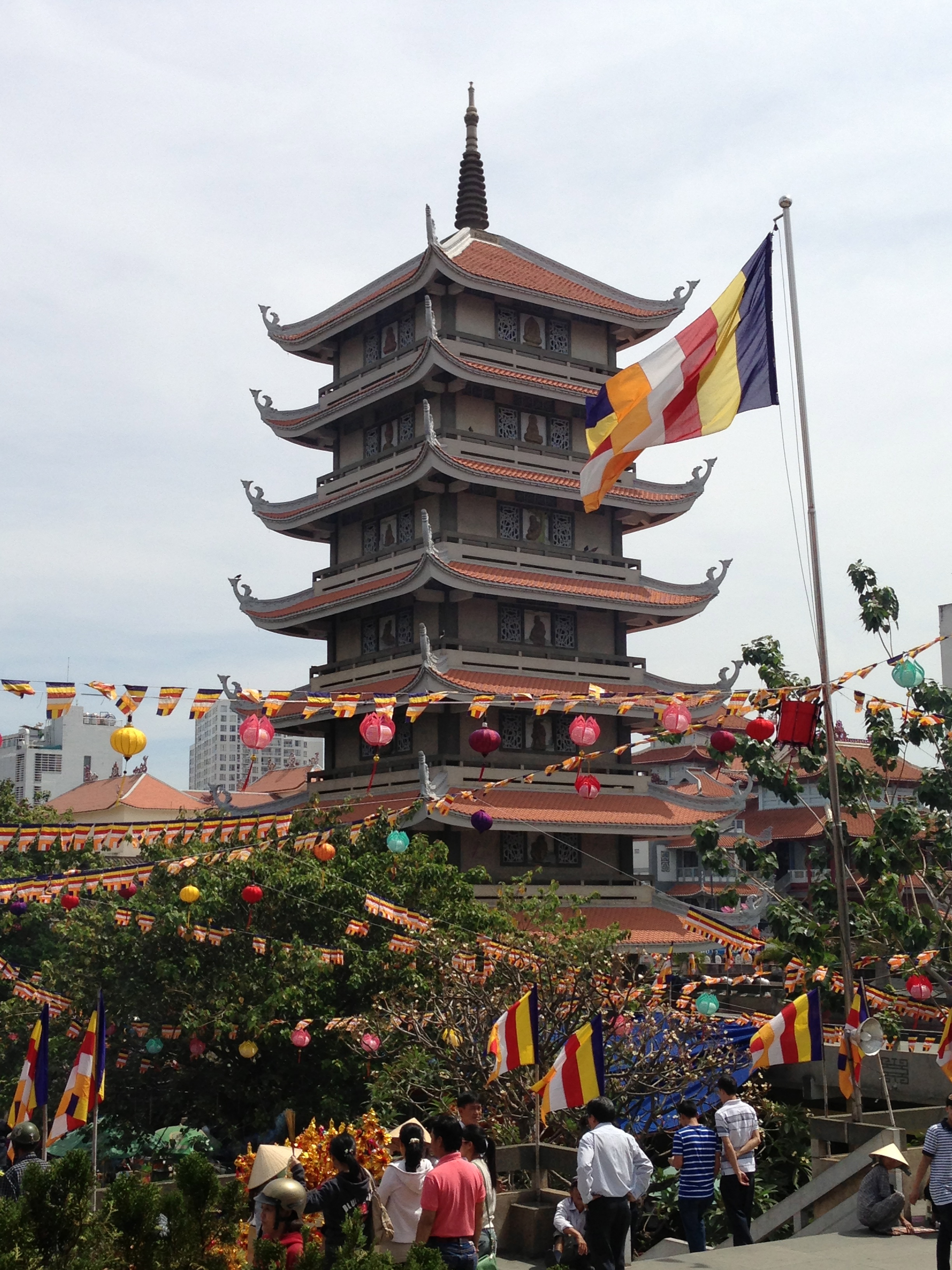
The seven-storey tower

Vĩnh Nghiêm Pagoda (Chùa Vĩnh Nghiêm; literally Ever Solemn) is a pagoda in an area of 6,000 square metres (65,000 sq ft) at 339, Nam Kỳ Khởi Nghĩa street, Ward 7, District 3 Ho Chi Minh City. This is the first pagoda in Vietnam to be built in Vietnamese traditional architecture style but with concrete. The highest structure in this pagoda is the 7-story, 40-metre-high (130 ft) tower. This pagoda houses and worship of one buddha and two bodhisattvas: Gautama Buddha, Manjusri, Samantabhadra. The Peace Bell was donated by a monk of Entsuji Temple in Fukushima, Japan. The seven-storey tower was built with the assistance of the Japan-Vietnam Friendship Association.

== History ==
In 1964, two monks, Thích Tâm Giác and Thích Thanh Kiểm, who had come to South Vietnam from North Vietnam to spread Buddhism, began the construction of Vĩnh Nghiêm Pagoda. The model and namesake of the pagoda was the 11th century Vĩnh Nghiêm Pagoda in Đức La Village, Trí Yên Commune, Yên Dũng District, Bắc Giang Province, which dates the reign of Lý Thái Tổ during the Lý dynasty. The village was once a major center of Buddhist teaching and the Trúc Lâm sect of Vietnamese Buddhism.
