= Chuông Temple =

Buddhist temple in Vietnam

Coordinates: 20.6558°N 106.0500°E

Chuông Temple (Vietnamese: Chùa Chuông, Chữ Hán: 金鐘寺, Sino-Vietnamese: Kim Chung Tự) is a Buddhist temple in Hưng Yên.

== Localisation ==
It is located in Hưng Yên City, Vietnam.

== History ==
The temple has been restored in 1702 and in 1711.
