= Phước Sơn Temple =

Buddhist temple in Vietnam

Phước Sơn Temple (Chùa Phước Sơn, Vietnamese: Chùa Thập Tháp Di-Đà or Thập Tháp Di-Đà Tự) is a historic 19th-century temple in Tân Phước village, Xuân Sơn Bắc commune, Đồng Xuân district, Phú Yên Province in south central Vietnam. It was initially built in 1802.
