= Thập Tháp Di-Đà Temple =

Thập Tháp Temple
- Chùa Thập Tháp
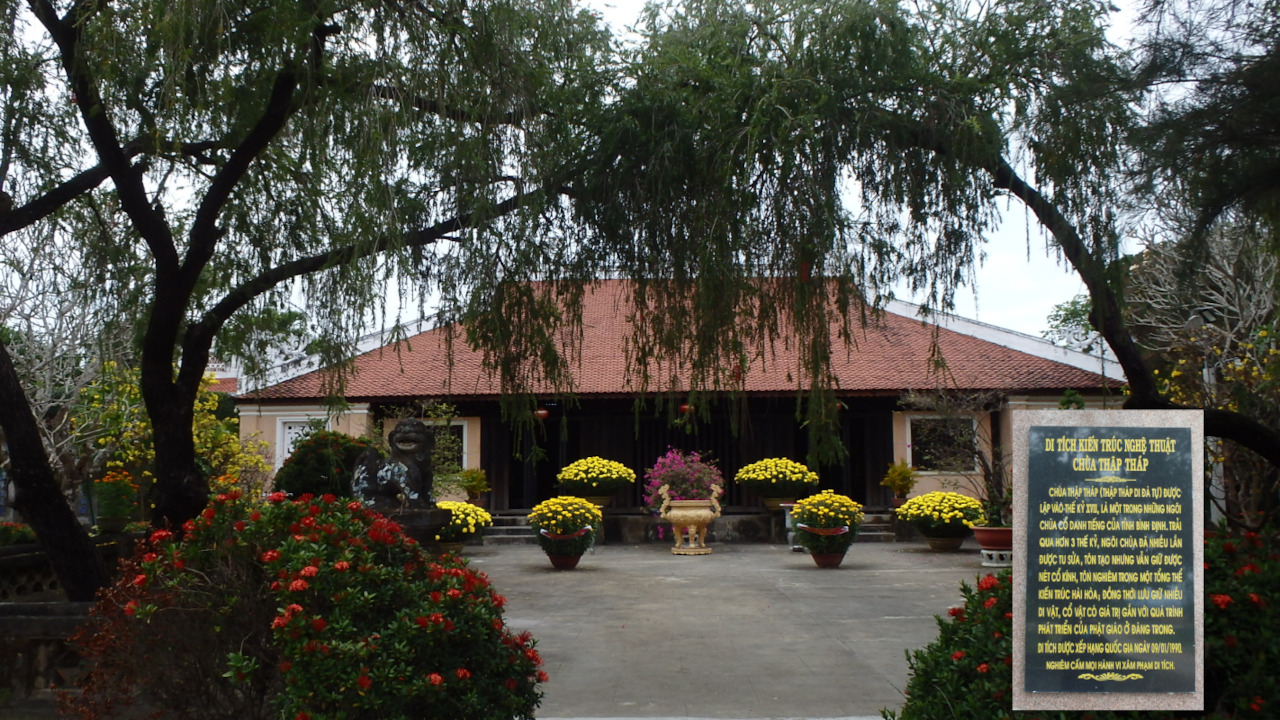
- Main Hall of Thập Tháp Di Đà Temple

Religion
- Affiliation: Buddhism
- District: An Nhơn
- Province: Bình Định

Location
- Location: Nhơn Thành ward
- Country: Vietnam

Architecture
- Completed: 17th century

Thập Tháp Di-Đà Temple (Ten Towers of Amitābha Temple, Vietnamese: Chùa Thập Tháp Di-Đà or Thập Tháp Di-Đà Tự) is historic 17th-century temple in Bình Định Province in south central Vietnam.

Originally constructed in 1683 by Zen master Nguyên Thiều (1648 - 1728), it has been heritage listed as being of national cultural significance.
