= Huyen Khong Son Thuong Monastery =

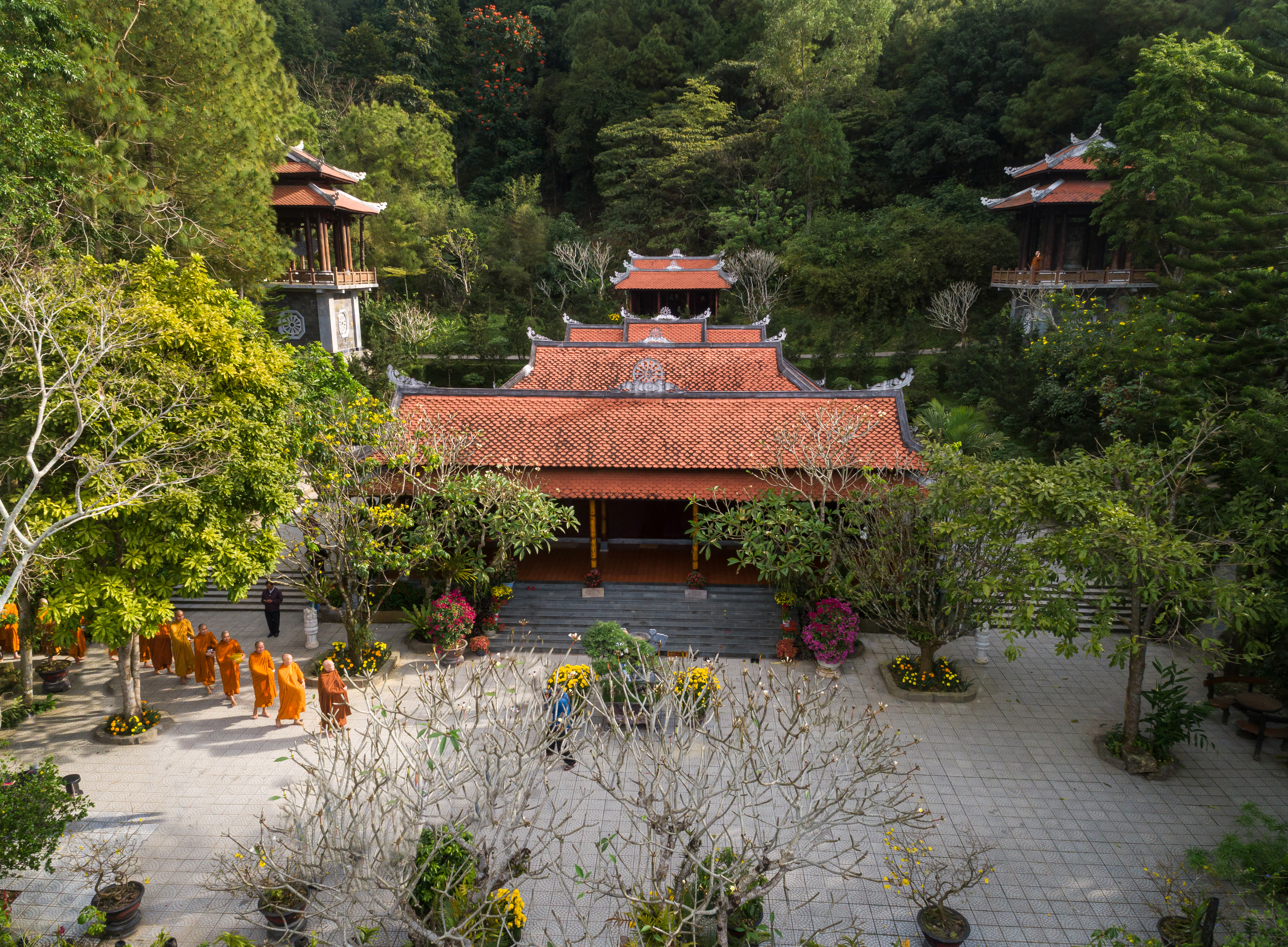
Huyền Không Sơn Thượng Monastery

Huyền Không Sơn Thượng Monastery [Pali. Abhisuññatāvanārama] is located in Chầm hamlet, Hương Hồ commune, Hương Trà District which is a famous monastery and a beautiful landscape of the ancient capital of Huế. This monastery belongs to Theravada Buddhism and was built by Ven. Sīlaguṇa in 1989. It is covered by an area of pine forest.

Huyền Không Sơn Thượng Monastery was built halfway down the mountain. It does not have the Tam quan – gateway like other monasteries in Vietnam. The gateway of the monastery is only normal like the gateways of an ancient house in Huế city. The area of the monastery is a large garden of green grass, with many small ponds that contain many pink blowing water lilies, and the vases of precious orchids, and ferm – palms, pines, cypresses and so on. Their age was over 100 years.

The area of the monastery consists of a main temple, a main hut where the chief monk lives and practices spiritual life, named "Am May Tia", a rest – house, named "Nghinh Luong Dinh", a guest house, a general house, named "Chung Hoa Duong", a dining room, named "Quan Thien Duong", a building – room, and small hut where monks practice spiritual life. In addition there are many kinds of trees and flowers which have been planted around the garden of monastery.

The main temple of Huyen Khong Son Thuong Monastery is the same as the architecture of an ancient house in Hue city. By the style of traditional architecture and material, taking the poetical spirit for the principal idea, reducing the role of religious faith, and only focusing on practicing meditation, this monastery has preserved the shape of Huế spirit, and Vietnam spirit as well.

"Am May Tia" is a central hut that the chief monk has used for dwelling place; reading books, inviting guests, or writing calligraphy. It is also used as a place where whoever likes literature, poetry or calligraphy can assemble together to discuss the Buddha's Teaching, or criticize a poem, or train pence, or show words and so on.

"Yen Ha Cac" is used for inviting guests and has the manner of flexible architecture. Its roof, columns, interior designs, etc. were all painted brown to create simpleness, warmness and so on.

"Nghi Luong Dinh" where guests who come from all directions can stop their feet for resting, drinking tea and discussing the Buddha's Teaching with monastic monks.
