= Báo Quốc Temple =

Buddhist temple in Vietnam

Coordinates: 16.4547°N 107.5804°E

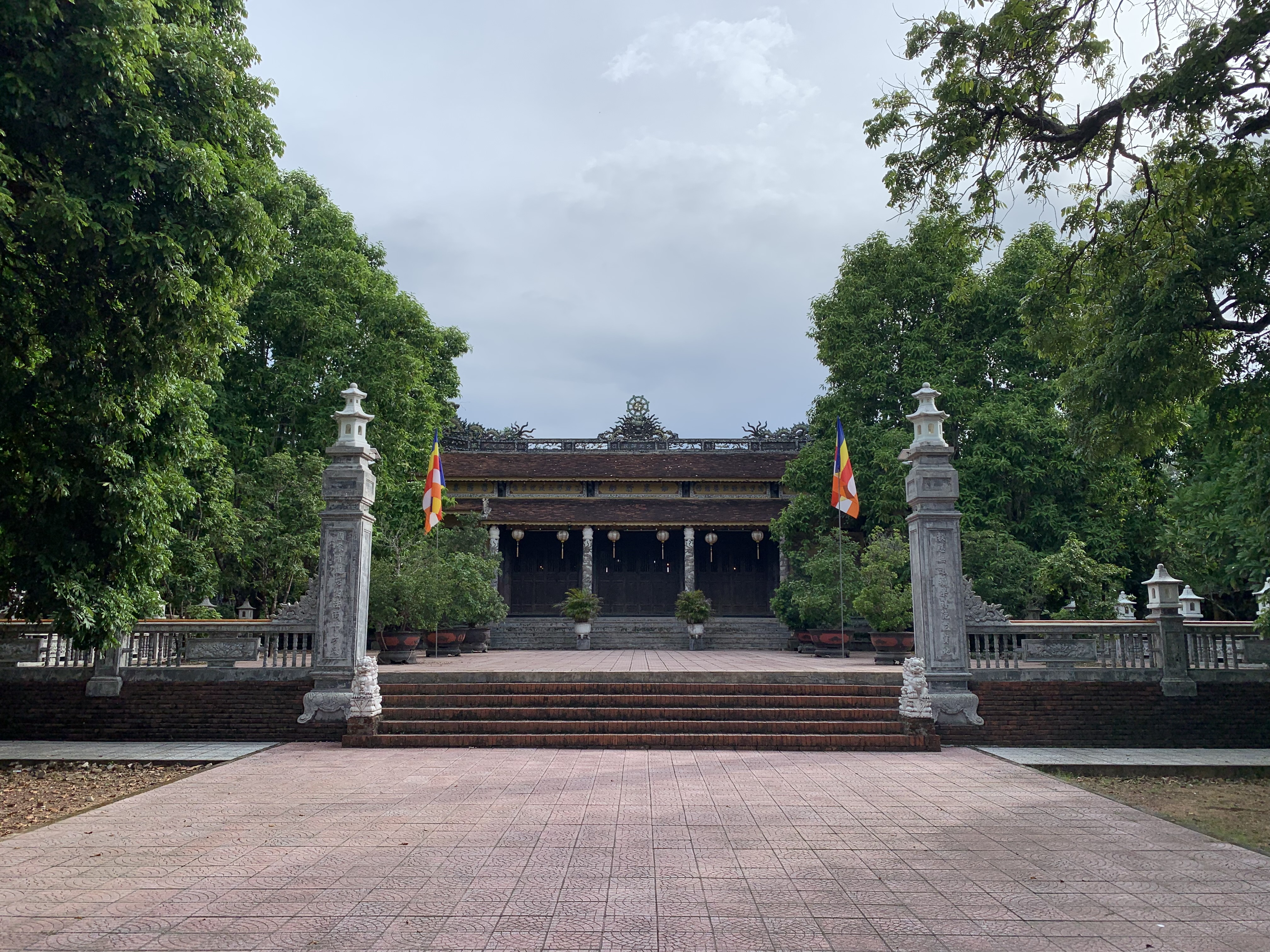
Main hall of the Báo Quốc Temple in 2024

Báo Quốc Temple (Vietnamese: Chùa Báo Quốc) is a Buddhist temple in the historic city of Huế in central Vietnam. It was one of the three national temples of the city during the time of the Nguyễn dynasty.

The temple is located on Báo Quốc Street, in the ward of Phường Đúc in Huế. It lies on the southern side of the Perfume River and is approximately one kilometre west of the city centre. The temple is located on a small hill called Hàm Long and a spring from the top of the hill flows down into the grounds of the temple.

== History ==
Báo Quốc Temple was built in 1670 by Thiền master Thích Giác Phong, a Buddhist monk from China, and it was initially named Hàm Long Sơn Thiên Thọ Tự during the reign of Nguyễn Phúc Tần, one of the Nguyễn lords who ruled central Vietnam during the period. In 1747, Nguyễn Phúc Khoát, gave the temple a plaque with the name Sắc Tứ Báo Quốc Tự.

During the era of the Nguyễn dynasty, which was founded in 1802 by Emperor Gia Long, the pagoda was frequently renovated and expanded. In 1808, Empress Hiếu Khương, wife of Gia Long, patronized various construction projects, that included the construction of a triple gate, the casting of a large bell and a gong. The named of the pagoda was changed to Chùa Thiên Thọ. The abbot who oversaw these changes was Zen master Thích Phổ Tịnh. In 1824, Emperor Minh Mạng, the son of Gia Long, visited the temple and changed its name to its present title. He held the imperial celebration for his 40th birthday at the temple in 1830.

Over the years, the temple began to decay, and in 1858, a series of renovation efforts began under Emperor Tự Đức, Minh Mạng's grandson, which were directly funded by the royal family. These continued until the end of the century.

In the 1930s, Báo Quốc was the scene of a revival in Buddhist education in Vietnam. In 1935, a school for teaching Buddhism was opened, and in 1940, a monastery for training monks was created, which is still operating to this day. In 1957, the latest phase of construction and renovation occurred under the auspices of the provincial Buddhist association, and overseen by the abbot of the temple and the director of Buddhist studies in the region, Thích Trí Thủ.

== Architecture and facilities ==
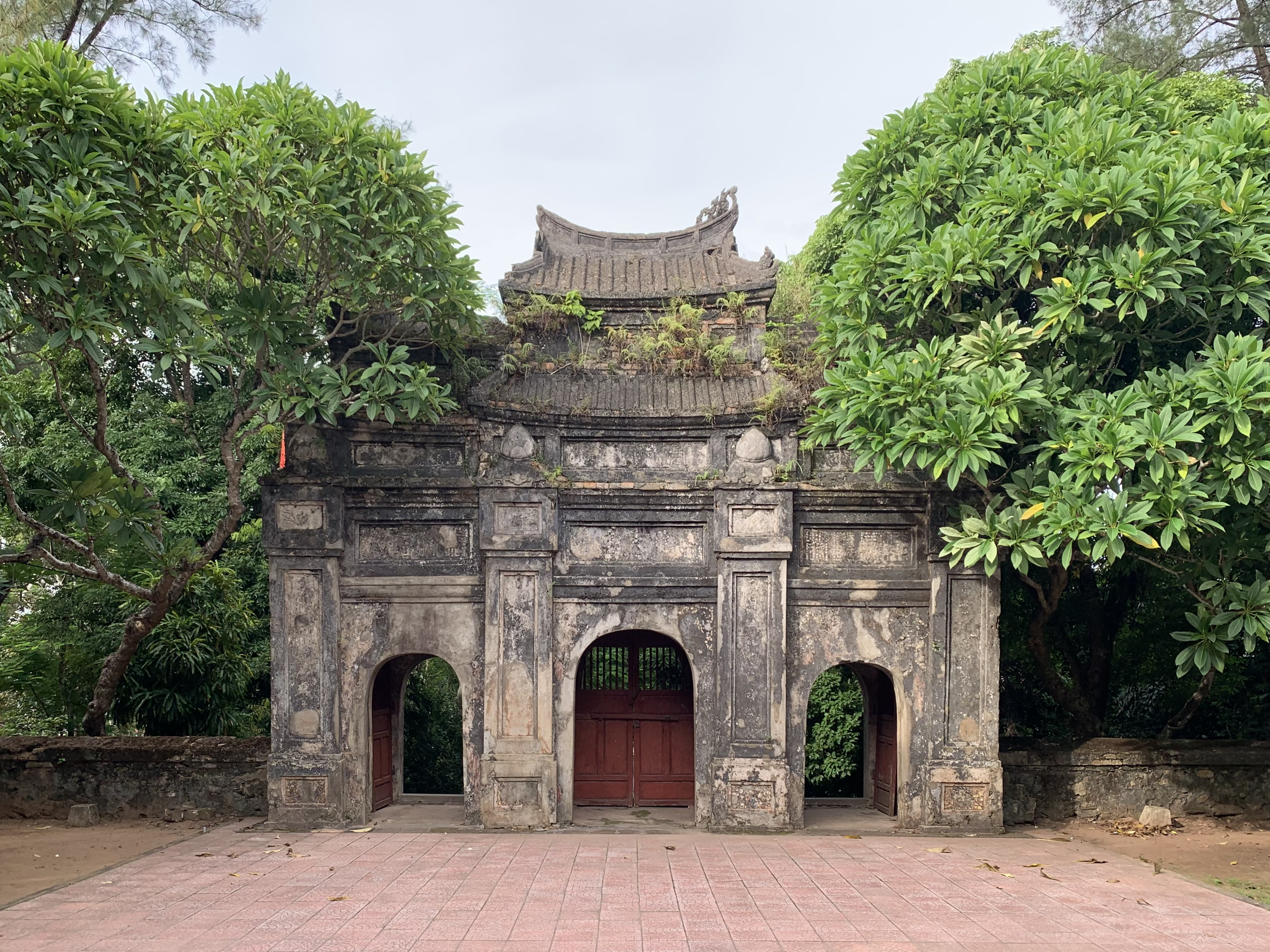
The triple gate of the Báo Quốc Temple as seen from within the temple ground

The temple is built on a plot of 2 hectares. Upon entering the temple through the triple gates, there is a spacious courtyard with a variety of plant life, surrounded by balconied buildings. On the left are stupas dedicated to Buddhist patriarchs, the oldest being that to Thich Giác Phong, which was built in 1714 and stands 3.30 m. The main temple building has four pillars with the figures of dragons built onto them.

The largest statue in the temple is a triple statue of the Buddha with two sets of Mahayana sutras. in front of the statue is a small stupa in which some relics of Gautama Buddha are enshrined. Another altar features the statue of Gautama Buddha, flanked by Ananda and Mahakassapa, respectively his personal attendant and the first patriarch of Buddhism after his death. Another altar features a copy of the Lotus Sutra, flanked by a ceremonial bell and a wooden fish gong.

In 1959, within the grounds of the temple, the Ham Long Primary School was opened, with the principal being Thích Thiên Ân. During the school year of 1961–62, the school expanded to cater for secondary education in addition to elementary schooling, with the first principal being Thân Trọng Hy. He was succeeded by Trương Như Thung, Thích Phước Hải, Thích Thiện Hạnh, Thích Đức Thanh and Thích Hải Ấn. The school was later renamed to Trường Bồ Đề Hàm Long (Ham Long Bodhi School). The school operated until 1975, when South Vietnam was overrun by the communist North Vietnam, and the school was closed.
