= Bửu Phong Temple =

Buddhist temple in Vietnam

Coordinates: 10°58′2.90″N 106°48′0.25″E

Bửu Phong Temple (Chùa Bửu Phong) is a historic 17th century Buddhist temple in Đồng Nai Province in southern Vietnam, north of Ho Chi Minh City.

The temple is located on Bửu Long mountain in Bình Điện, Tân Bửu, about 4 km from the city of Biên Hòa. Due to its location, it is also known as Bình Điện Temple.

== History ==
The temple was built by Thích Bửu Phong in the 17th century, at which point it was only a small shrine. The Đại Nam nhất thống chí, the official court records of the Nguyễn lords that ruled southern Vietnam during this period, said that the temple was to the south of Phước Chánh district, to the west of a large mountain range and to the north of Long Ẩn mountain. The chronicle made a note of the idyllic scenery of the surrounding area, which it praised as the best in the province. As a result of the temple's presence, it was also known as Bửu Phong mountain.

Towards the end of the 18th century, a large number of ethnic Chinese immigrants came into southern Vietnam following the fall of the Ming Dynasty, many of whom were Buddhists. The Chinese settlers rebuilt the original temple, equipping it with a tiled roof. They invited Zen master Thích Thành Trí, from the 36th generation of the Tào Động Zen lineage, to come and become the abbot of the temple. Zen master Thích Pháp Thông was also responsible for the construction of the nearby Long Ẩn Temple on the Long Ẩn mountain directly in front of Bửu Long mountain. There is now a hexagonal stupa at Long Ẩn Temple for Thích Pháp Thông's remains.

According to the records of Nguyễn Hiền Đức in the book Thiền sư Việt Nam (Vietnamese Zen masters) compiled by Thích Thanh Từ, Thích Pháp Thông had no disciples to continue his lineage, so the Zen Master Thích Viên Quang from Minh Hương, from the 36th generation of the Lâm Tế lineage became the abbot of the temple. In 1760, he held a renovation of the temple.

In 1829, the temple was rebuilt and expanded due to large donations made by Nguyễn Văn Hiệp and Nguyễn Văn Tâm. The temple was later refurbished further in the late 19th century and also in the 20th century.

== Features ==
From the road to the entrance of the temple, there are 100 steps up the side of the hill. At the entrance is a large arched triple gate. At the front of the temple, there are inscriptions of verses on the wall. In front of the temple is a statue of Avalokiteshvara bodhisattva, erected in 1963.

Inside the highly decorated main hall is a historic statue of Amitabha Buddha. There is also a stupa behind the main hall where a sample of the relics of Gautama Buddha are enshrined.

In present times, Bửu Long mountain has become an important tourist and historical attraction of Đồng Nai Province. In the surrounding area, there are further stupas and statues which depict three key moments in the life of Gautama Buddha: his birth as Prince Siddhartha at Lumbini, his enlightenment under the bodhi tree at Bodh Gaya and the entering into nirvana at Kusinara.
