= Long Sơn Temple =

Buddhist temple in Vietnam

Coordinates: 12.251601°N 109.180765°E

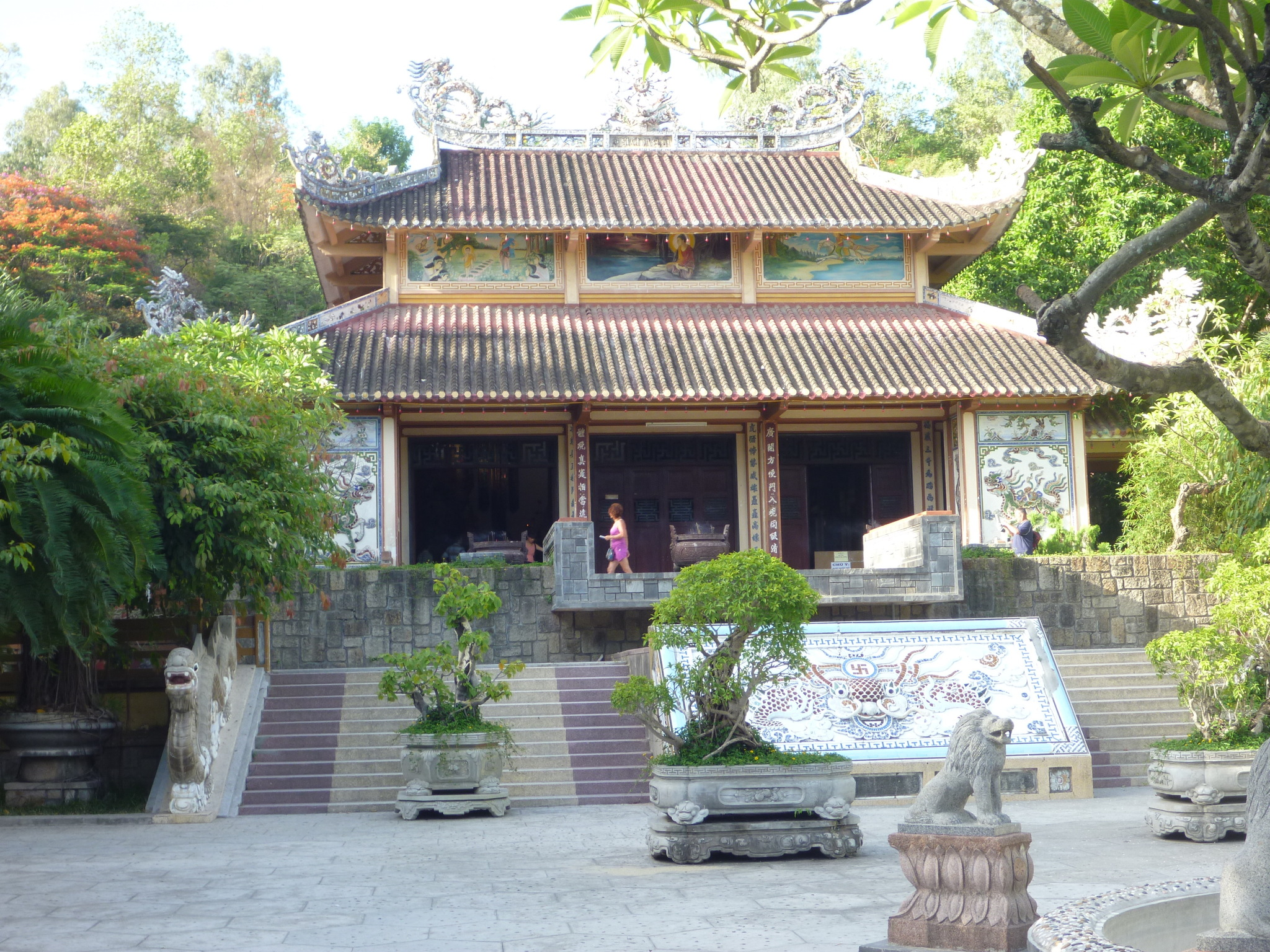
Long Sơn Temple

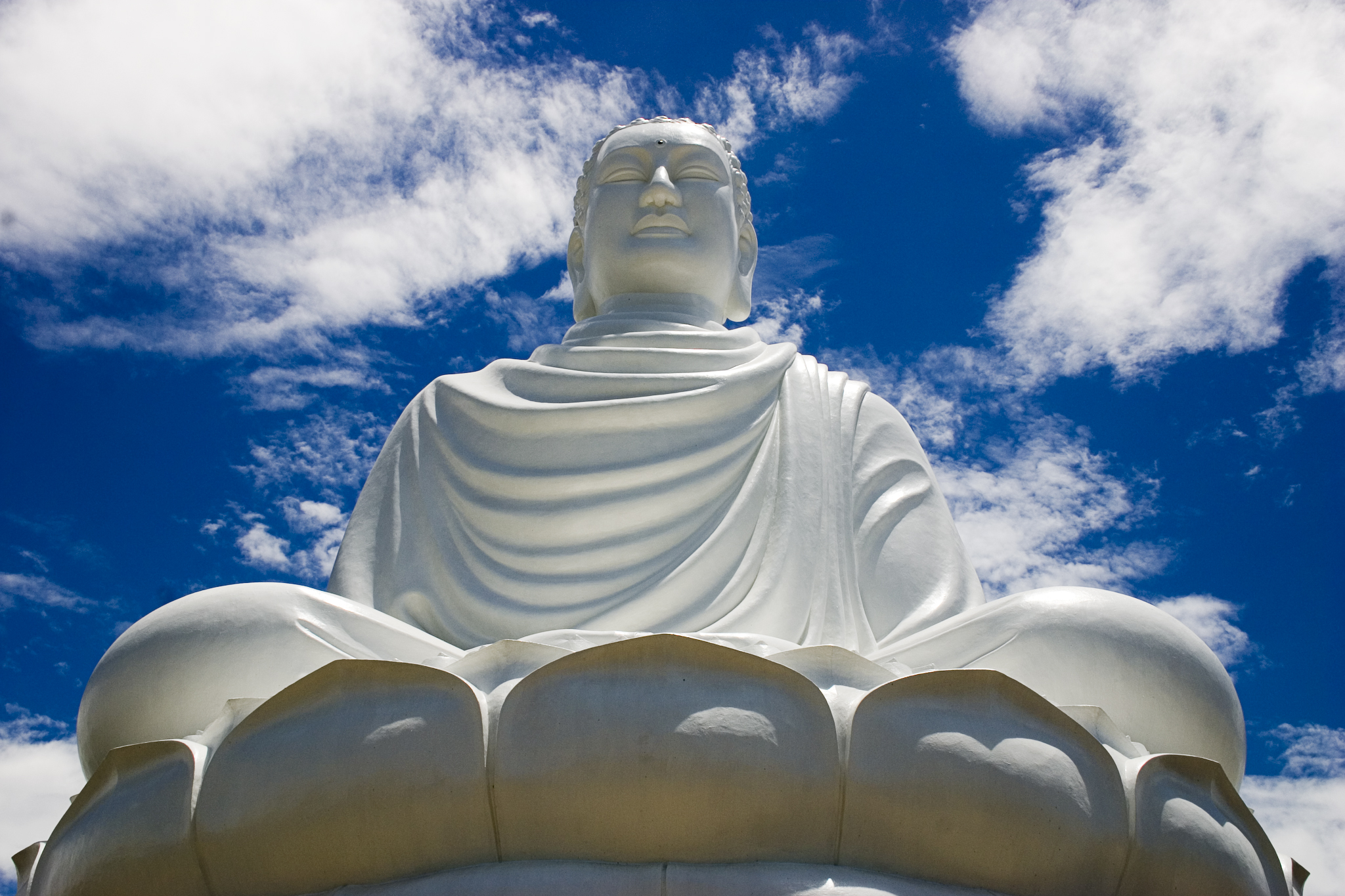
Buddha of Long Sơn

Long Sơn Temple (Vietnamese: Chùa Long Sơn) is a Buddhist temple in the city of Nha Trang on South Central Coast of Vietnam. It is regarded as one of the main sites in the city, along with Hai Duc Temple.

== History ==
Long Sơn Temple was previously known as Đăng Long Tự and it is located at 22 October 23 Street. It is located in the ward of Phương Sơn, and sits at the foot of Trại Thủy mountain, in city of Nha Trang, just 400 m west of the railway station.

Long Sơn Temple was erected on another hill in 1886 under the abbotship of Thích Ngộ Chí (1856–1935), who hailed from the district of Vinh Xuong in Khánh Hòa Province. Before joining the sangha, he was a participant in anti-French resistance forces that attempted to regain Vietnamese independence.

In 1900, after a large cyclone, the temple was destroyed and had to be moved from the hill to its current location. In 1936, the Buddhist Studies Association made the temple the headquarters of the Buddhist Association in Khánh Hòa Province. In 1940, the temple was renovated and expanded under the leadership of Thích Tôn Thất Quyền and a lay Buddhist by the named of Võ Đình Thụy. In 1968, the temple was heavily damaged during the Vietnam War, in particular the tiled roof. In 1971, Thích Thiện Bình organised for the capital works program to restore the temple, which was around 60% complete in accordance with the plans of the architect Võ Đình Diệp when it was interrupted by the Fall of Saigon and the communist victory over South Vietnam.

Since its construction, the temple has had a stable leadership, with only three abbots in over 120 years: Thích Ngộ Chí (1886–1935), Thích Chánh Hóa (1936–1957) and Thích Chí Tín (1957–).

From the Long Sơn Temple, there is a large road leading up to Hai Duc Temple along the crest of the hill, where there is a large white concrete statue of Gautama Buddha. The statue was built on the site of the original temple and the statue was cast in 1964 before being installed the following year, under the auspices of Thích Đức Minh, who was the Head of the Buddhist Association of Khánh Hòa Province. The sculpture of the statue was by Kim Điền. From the ground up, the statues is 24 m, and from the base of the statue, it is 21 m. The figure of the Buddha is 14 m while the lotus blossom comprises 7 m. Around the statue are statues of seven arahants. In front of the statue are a pair of dragons, which are 7.20 m long. The statue is visible from afar as one enters the city, from either the national highway or by train.

The temple grounds also includes a garden.

The entrance and roofs are decorated with dragon mosaics which are built from glass and ceramic tiles. The main ceremonial hall is adorned with modern interpretations of classical motifs. The nasal hairs of the dragons are wrapped around the pillars on either side of the main altar.

The main statue in 152 stone steps up from the entrance of the temple, and is often used as a vantage point to look over the city of Nha Trang.

== Gallery ==
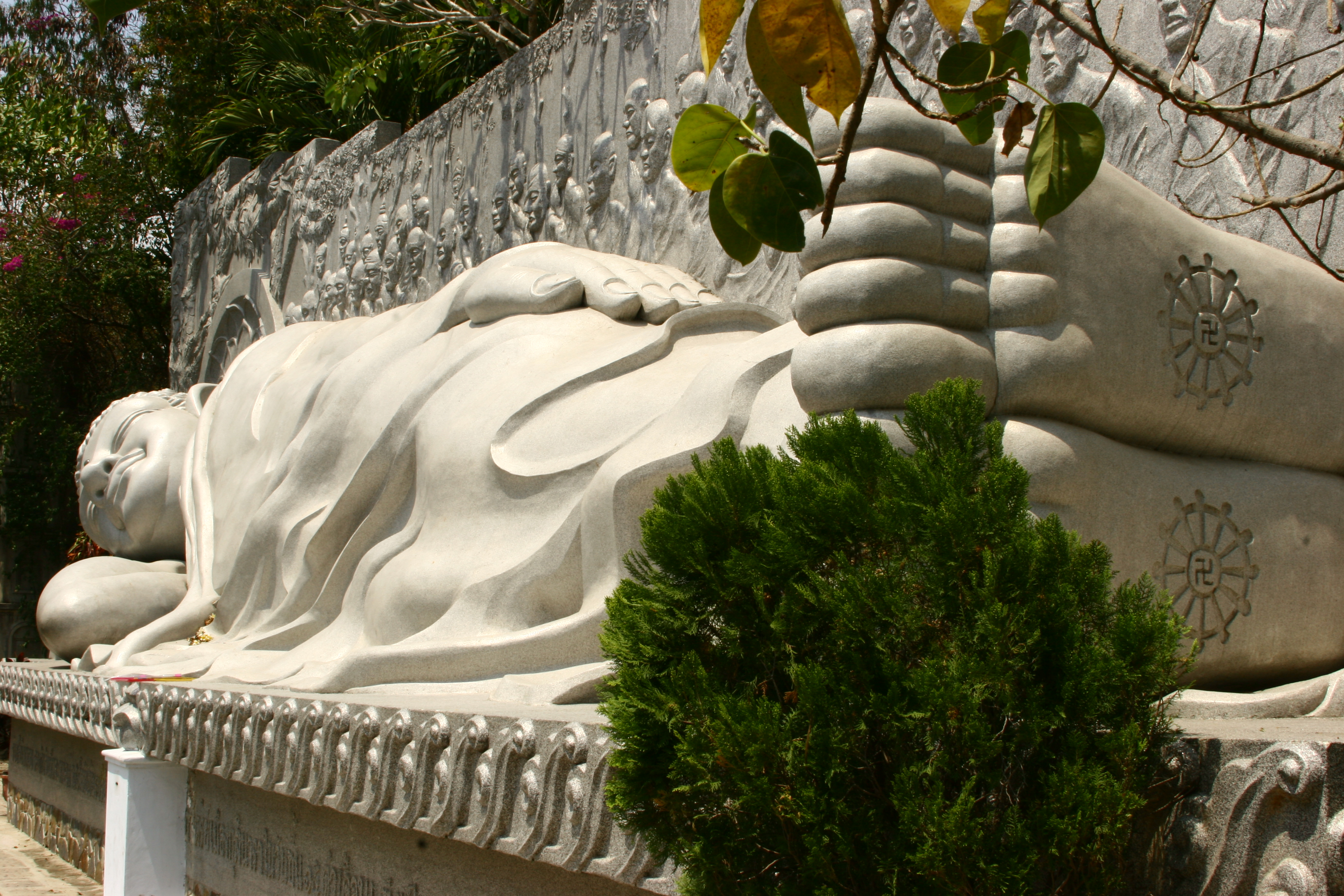
Lying Buddha statue

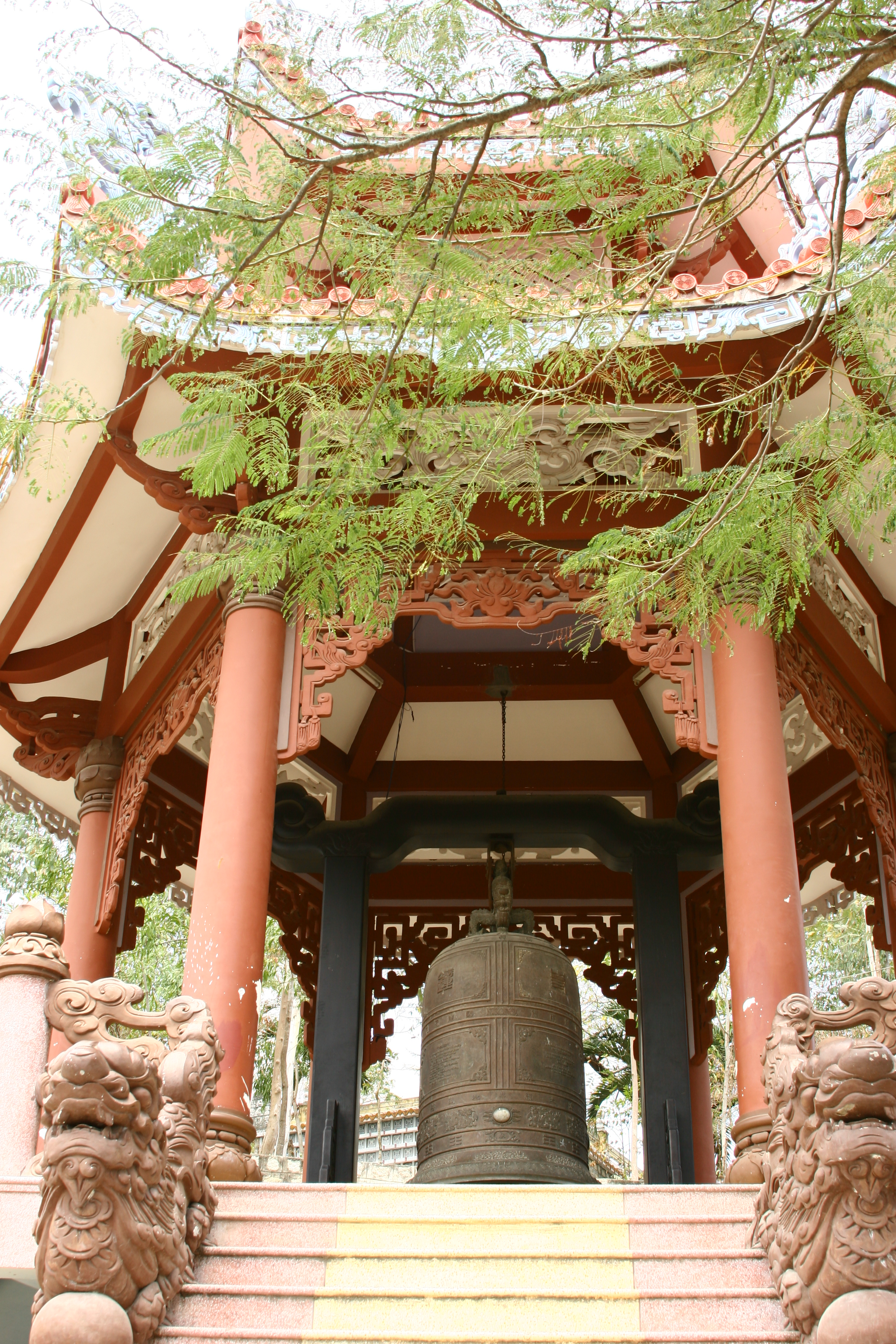
Bell tower

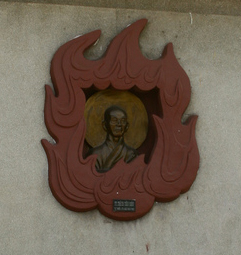
Portrait of a monk at the Buddha's feet

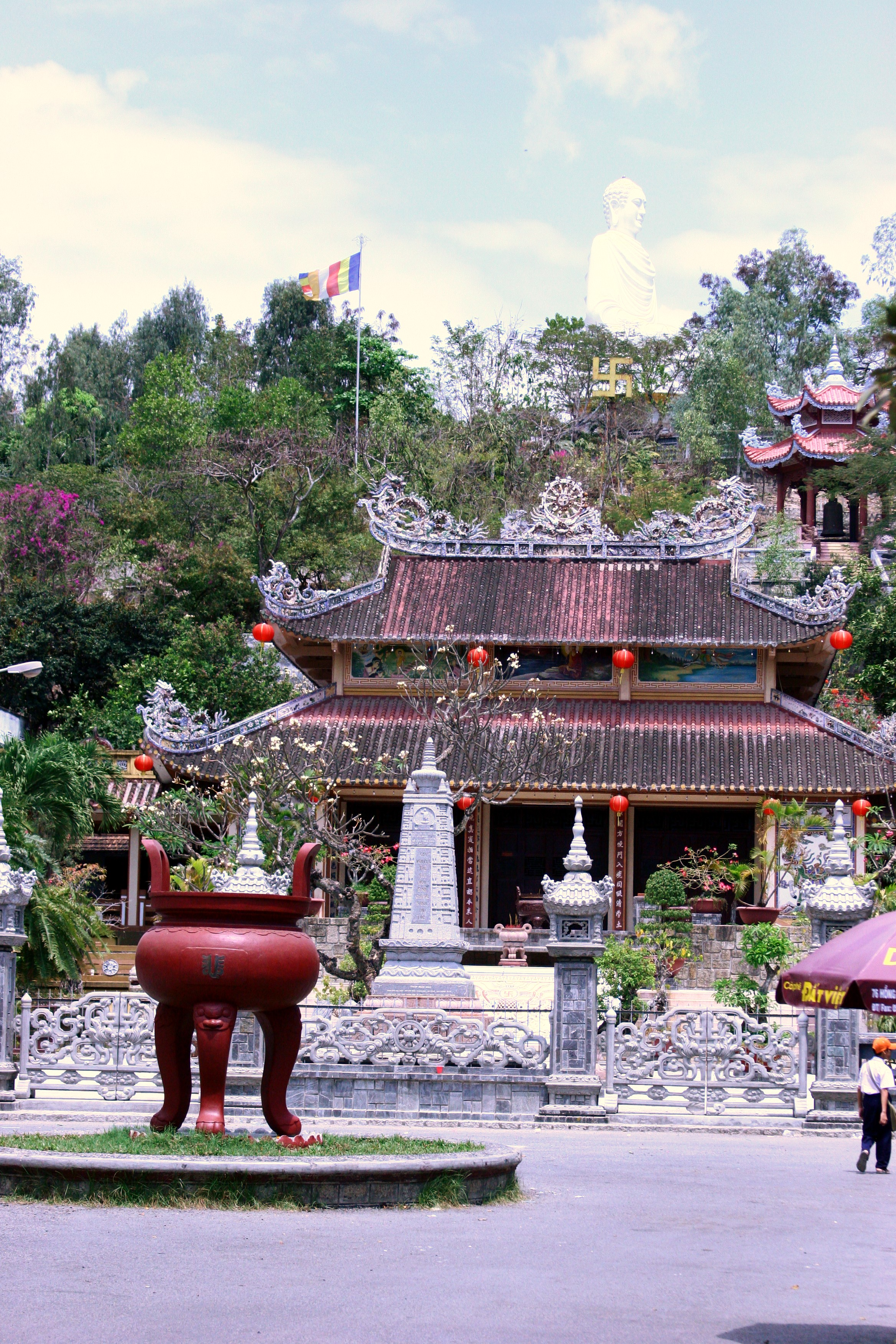
Long Son Pagoda

== See also ==
- List of tallest statues
