= Tà Cú Mountain =

Mountain in Vietnam

Ta Cu
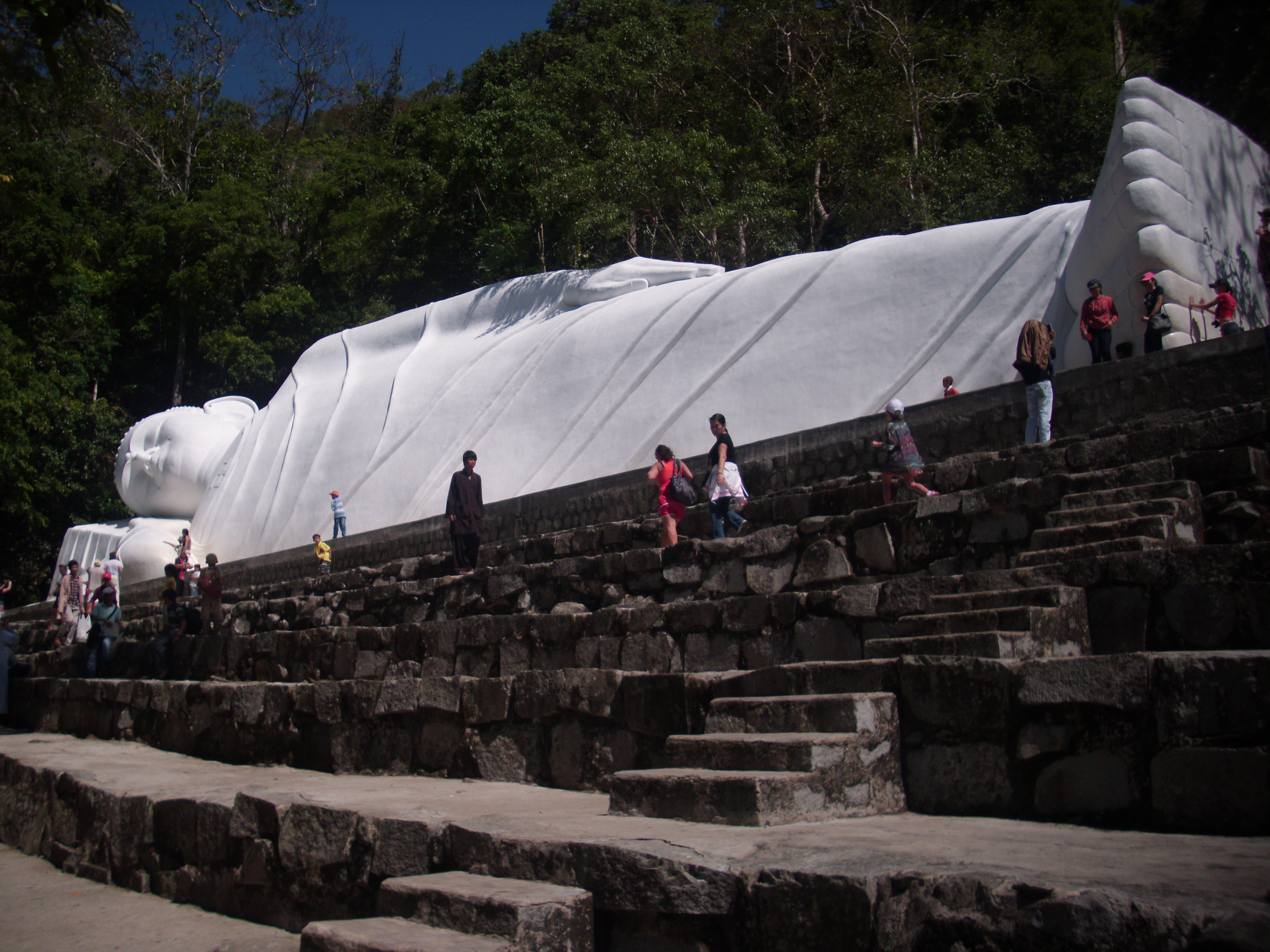
- Sleeping Buddha on the Tà Cú

Highest point
- Elevation: 649 m (2,129 ft)
- Coordinates: 10°49′41″N 107°52′58″E

Geography
- Location within Vietnam
- Location: Bình Thuận Province, Vietnam

Ta Cu Mount (Vietnamese: Núi Tà Cú) is a mountain located off of National Route 1 in the town of Thuận Nam, Hàm Thuận Nam District. Ta Cu Mountain is 28 km west of Phan Thiết city, in Bình Thuận Province, Nam Trung Bộ, Vietnam. The average temperature at the summit ranges from around 18 to 22 °C. There is a path from the foot of the mountain to the summit, a distance of 2290 meters. An alternate more popular route up the side of the mountain is via a 1600-meter-long Austrian aerial tram. At the height of 563 meters, there are two pagodas: the Upper Pagoda (Linh Sơn Trường Thọ) and the Lower Pagoda (Long Đoàn). However, the mountain is most famous as the site of the statue of the reclining Gautama Buddha, which at 49 meters in length is the largest reclining Buddha in Southeast Asia. The statue of the Buddha is an additional 300 steps from the top of the tram.

From the top of the mountain, there are views of the dragon fruit farms and rice paddies below.

In the 1870s and 1880s, a Buddhist monk named Tran Huu Duc led a group of Buddhist faithful in the construction of the Linh Son Truong Tho Pagoda. After his death in 1887, a group of his followers built the lower Long Doan Pagoda. Then in 1958, a man named Truong Dinh Y began construction of the 49 meter-long, seven meter-high reclining Buddha, as well as three additional smaller Buddha statues.

There is a cave near the statues which has been named the Forefathers Cave. At the bottom of the cave is a small stream, which disappears into the cave floor. It is inside this cave that Tran Huu Duc spent much of his time in meditation.
