= Châu Đốc (city) =

City in An Giang, Vietnam

- Provincial city (Class-2)
- Châu Đốc City; Thành phố Châu Đốc
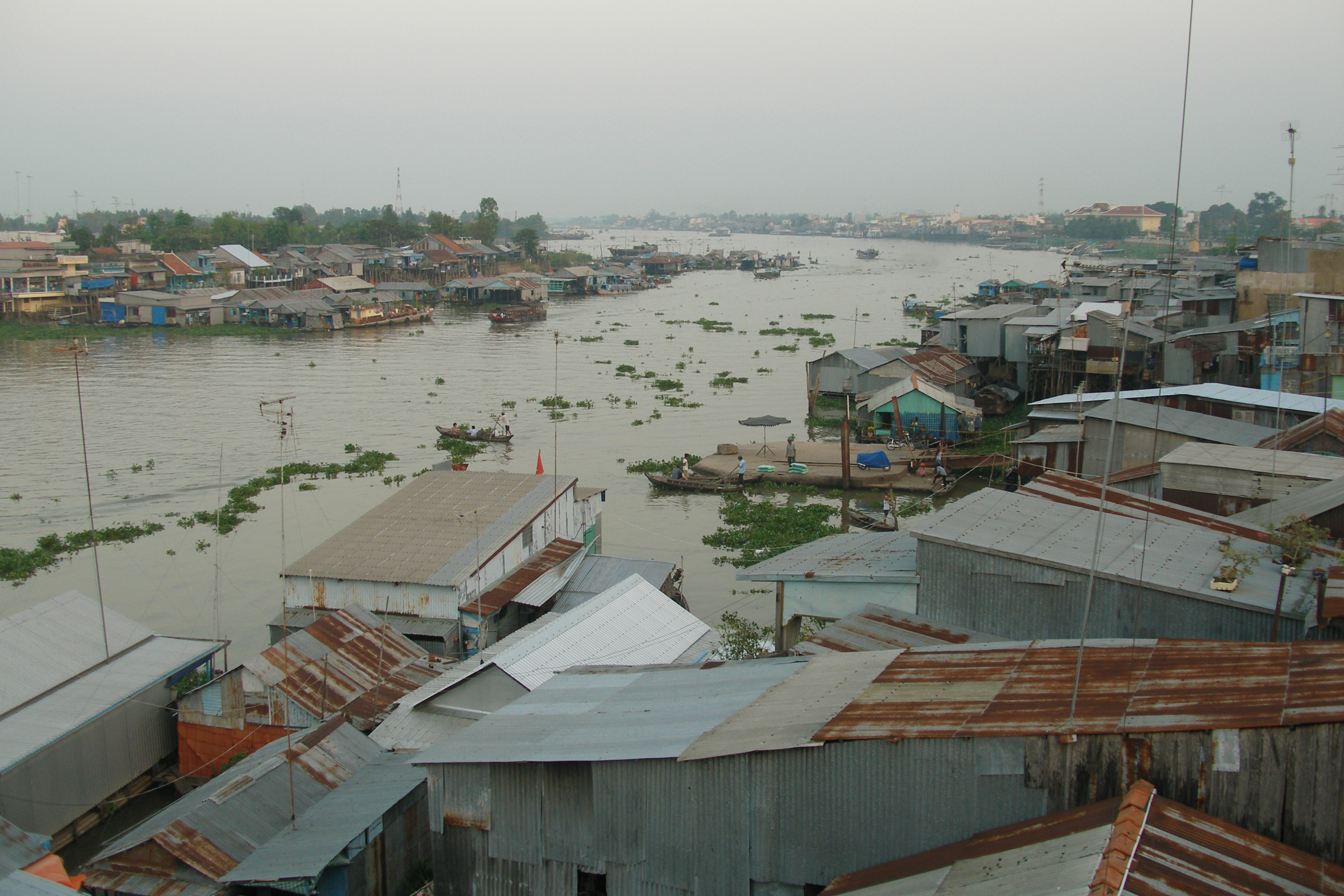
- Panoramic view of Châu Đốc.
- Interactive map of Châu Đốc
- Location in Vietnam
- Coordinates: 10°42′N 105°7′E
- Country: Vietnam
- Province: An Giang Province

Area
  - Total: 40.65 sq mi (105.29 km^{2})

Population (2019 census)
  - Total: 101,765
  - Density: 2,503.3/sq mi (966.52/km^{2})
- Time zone: UTC+7 (ICT)

Châu Đốc is a former city of An Giang Province, bordering Cambodia, in the Mekong Delta region of Vietnam. As of 2019, the city had a population of 101,765, and cover an area of 105.29 square kilometres (40.65 sq mi).

The city is located by the Hậu River (a branch of the Mekong River flowing through Vietnamese territory) and Vĩnh Tế Canal. Châu Đốc is situated 250 kilometres (160 mi) west of Ho Chi Minh City. It takes about 5 hours to travel by bus from Ho Chi Minh City.

== History ==
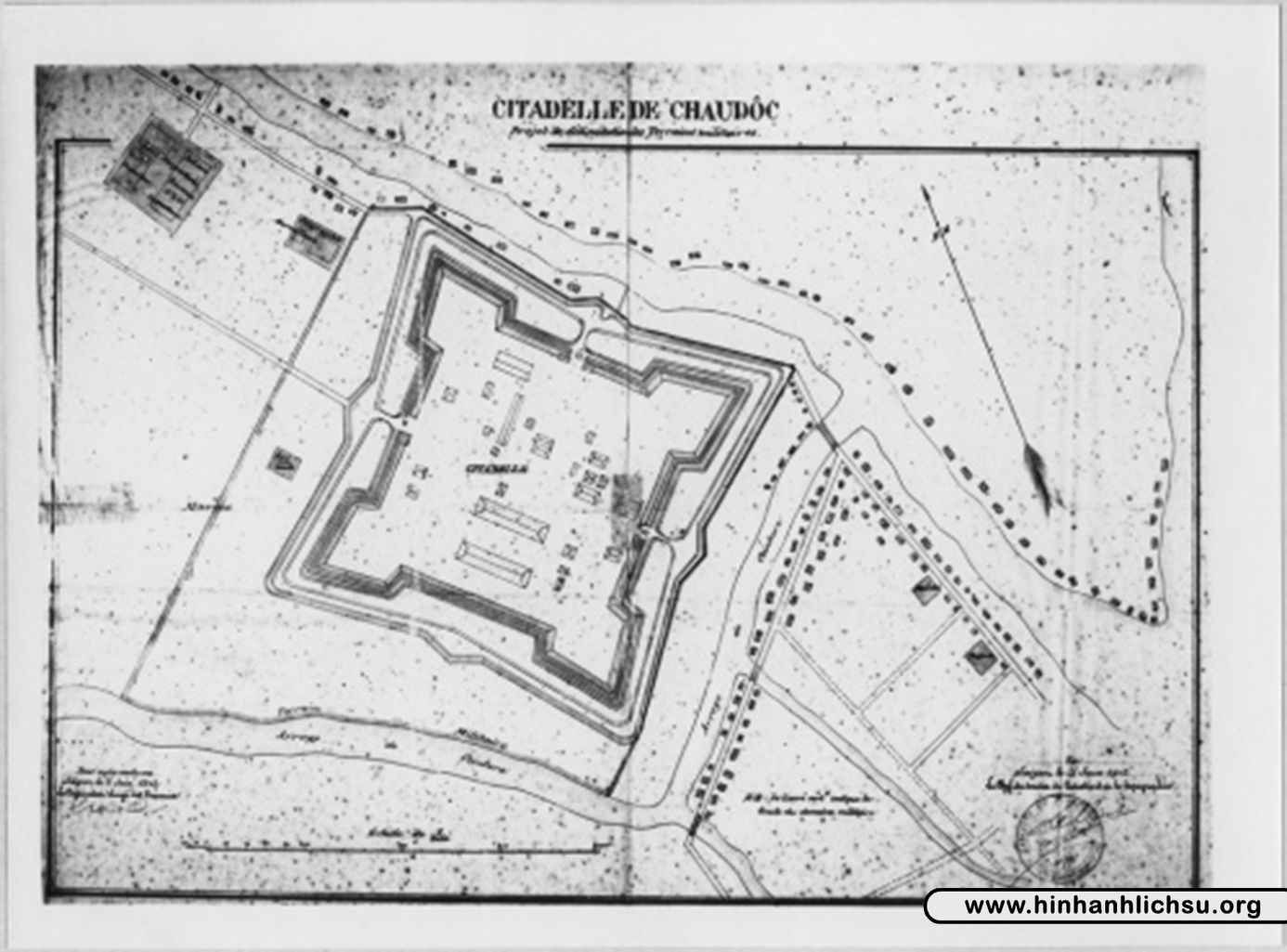
Drawing of Châu Đốc citadel in 1912

The territory became Vietnam's around the 17th century. The town is near the picturesque Sam Mountain where the Sam Mountain Lady (Vietnamese: Bà Chúa Xứ Núi Sam) is worshipped. The Sam Mount Lady Ceremony is held every April of lunar calendar (May) every year.

Floods caused devastation in the region, the one in late 1938 saw 125,000 hectares of ruined rice land due to floods.

In 1957, the town was the site of the Châu Đốc massacre.

On June 16, 2025, the Standing Committee of the National Assembly issued Resolution No. 1685/NQ-UBTVQH15. The city was dissolved and new wards were rearranged from the district.

== Climate ==
Châu Đốc has a tropical savanna climate (Köppen Aw) with a long though not extreme wet season from April to November and a dry season from December to March.

Climate data for Châu Đốc
Month	Jan	Feb	Mar	Apr	May	Jun	Jul	Aug	Sep	Oct	Nov	Dec	Year
Record high °C (°F)	34.9 (94.8)	36.4 (97.5)	37.7 (99.9)	38.6 (101.5)	38.4 (101.1)	36.8 (98.2)	35.4 (95.7)	35.1 (95.2)	35.5 (95.9)	35.4 (95.7)	33.9 (93.0)	34.5 (94.1)	38.6 (101.5)
Mean daily maximum °C (°F)	30.6 (87.1)	31.7 (89.1)	33.5 (92.3)	34.7 (94.5)	33.6 (92.5)	32.5 (90.5)	32.0 (89.6)	31.7 (89.1)	31.3 (88.3)	31.9 (89.4)	30.9 (87.6)	30.1 (86.2)	32.0 (89.6)
Daily mean °C (°F)	25.8 (78.4)	26.2 (79.2)	27.6 (81.7)	28.8 (83.8)	28.5 (83.3)	27.9 (82.2)	27.5 (81.5)	27.7 (81.9)	27.7 (81.9)	27.5 (81.5)	27.3 (81.1)	26.1 (79.0)	27.4 (81.3)
Mean daily minimum °C (°F)	22.6 (72.7)	22.6 (72.7)	23.7 (74.7)	25.2 (77.4)	25.7 (78.3)	25.3 (77.5)	25.0 (77.0)	25.3 (77.5)	25.4 (77.7)	25.2 (77.4)	24.8 (76.6)	23.1 (73.6)	24.5 (76.1)
Record low °C (°F)	17.0 (62.6)	17.6 (63.7)	17.5 (63.5)	21.0 (69.8)	21.9 (71.4)	20.0 (68.0)	21.1 (70.0)	21.0 (69.8)	21.2 (70.2)	22.2 (72.0)	19.4 (66.9)	16.8 (62.2)	16.8 (62.2)
Average rainfall mm (inches)	8.1 (0.32)	4.2 (0.17)	23.2 (0.91)	94.2 (3.71)	165.5 (6.52)	125.9 (4.96)	155.7 (6.13)	179.3 (7.06)	184.1 (7.25)	269.0 (10.59)	149.4 (5.88)	46.5 (1.83)	1,412.6 (55.61)
Average rainy days	2.1	1.0	2.8	7.9	15.4	16.9	18.8	18.7	19.5	20.7	13.5	5.1	142.3
Average relative humidity (%)	78.4	79.4	77.2	77.1	81.9	83.3	83.4	82.8	83.7	83.2	80.0	78.0	80.7
Mean monthly sunshine hours	240.0	235.1	254.4	229.6	210.1	178.0	172.3	171.5	168.2	185.0	203.7	223.1	2,469.5
Source: Vietnam Institute for Building Science and Technology

== Landmarks ==
The Phước Điền Temple is located in Châu Đốc. It is an official historic monument of Vietnam. The Victoria Hotel is the only notable hotel in the area. There are also many hotels in the center near the main market area, where you can get good value for money accommodation. There are other hotels that are situated near Nui Sam. There are a couple of new hotels on the road to Sam Mountain. A worthwhile option to consider is a night (or two) in one of the floating hotels (there are 2, one reachable via footbridge, the other via boat).

Sam Mountain, being the highest mountain in Mekong Delta (284 m), is a famous mountain in Châu Đốc, about 7 kilometres (4.3 mi) from the city.

Tây An Temple, dating from 1847, is near the city.

== Population ==
Châu Đốc's population primarily consists of the Vietnamese, Cham, and Khmer. The three main religions in this region are Mahayana Buddhism (Kinh/Vietnamese); Theravada Buddhism (Khmer), and Sunni Islam (Chams). The total population is around 120,000 with a vast majority of Kinh (Viet).

In 2003, the district had a population of 112,155. The district covers an area of 100 square kilometres (39 sq mi).

As of April 2019, the city had a population of 101,765.

== Economy ==
Châu Đốc is famous for its variety of fish sauces (nước mắm) and mainly "mắm tai", a kind of anchovy. The local economy is based on the culture of basa catfish export and on tourism. The town is a busy trading center due to its border position with Cambodia. Local people also buy, sell, and exchange goods on boats on the river. It's called a floating market.

== Administrative subdivisions ==
Châu Đốc was subdivided into 7 commune-level subdivisions, including the wards of Châu Phú A, Châu Phú B, Núi Sam, Vĩnh Mỹ, Vĩnh Nguơn, and the rural communes of Vĩnh Châu and Vĩnh Tế.

== Gallery ==
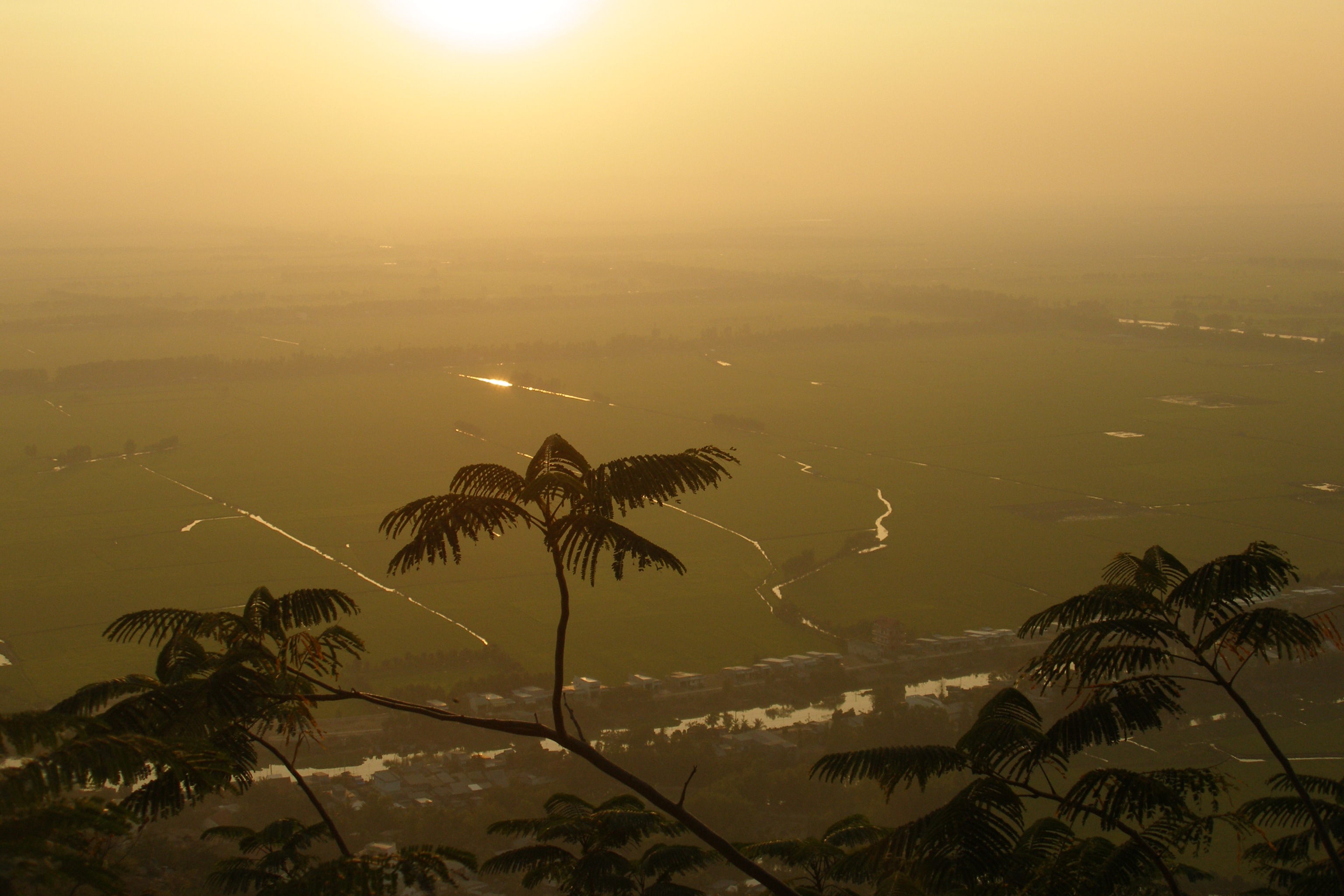
View from Sam Mountain

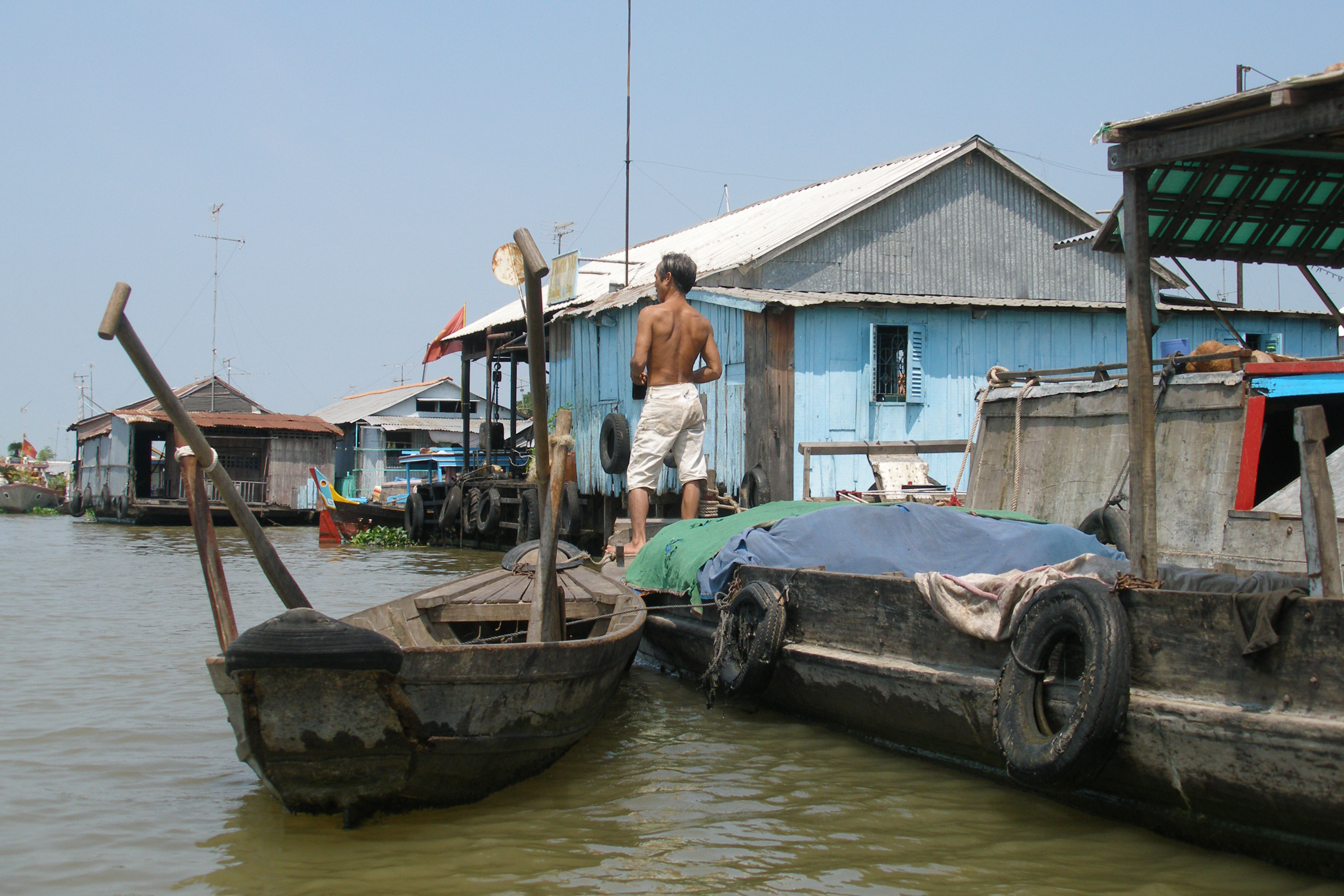
Houses on Bassac River

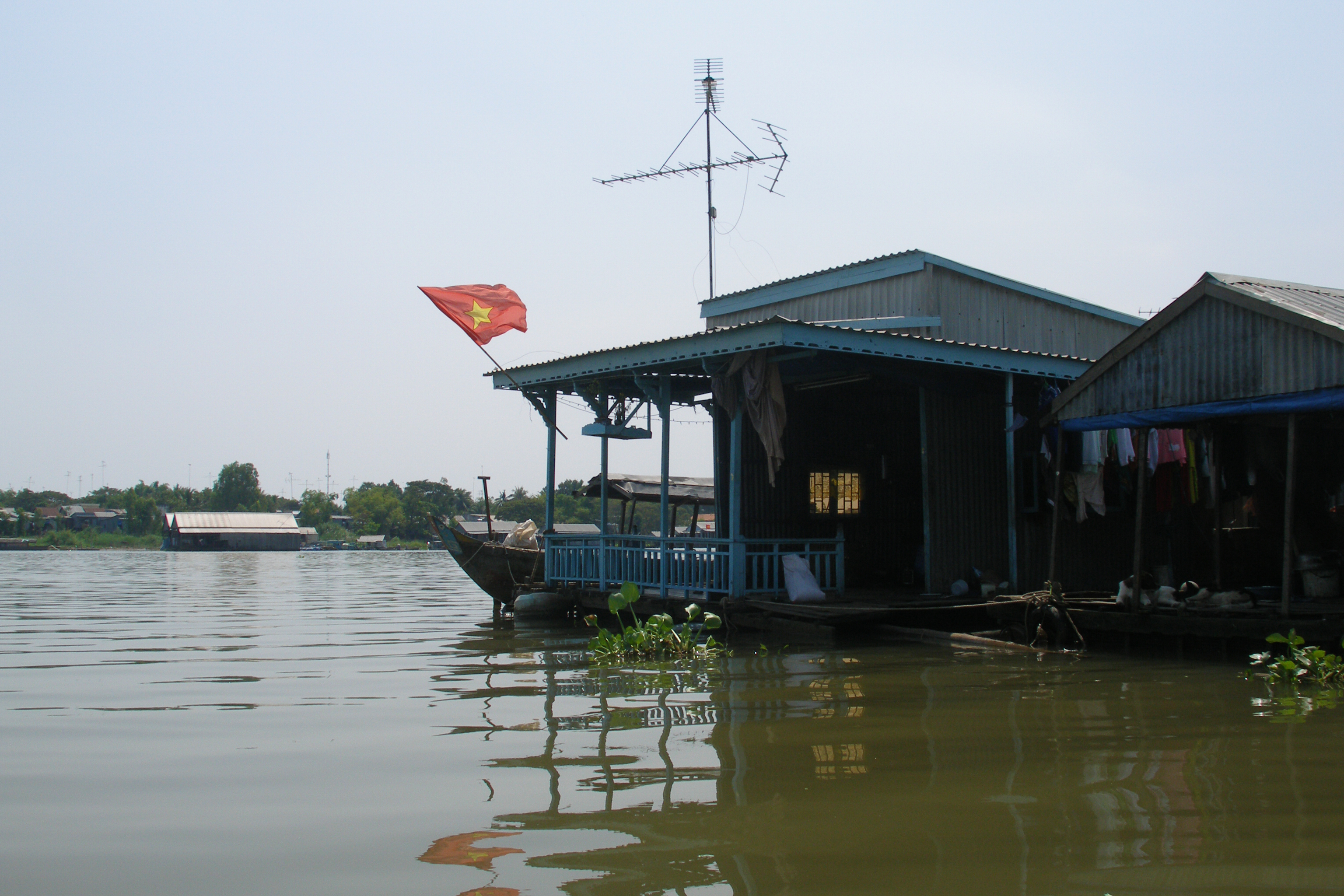
Floating village

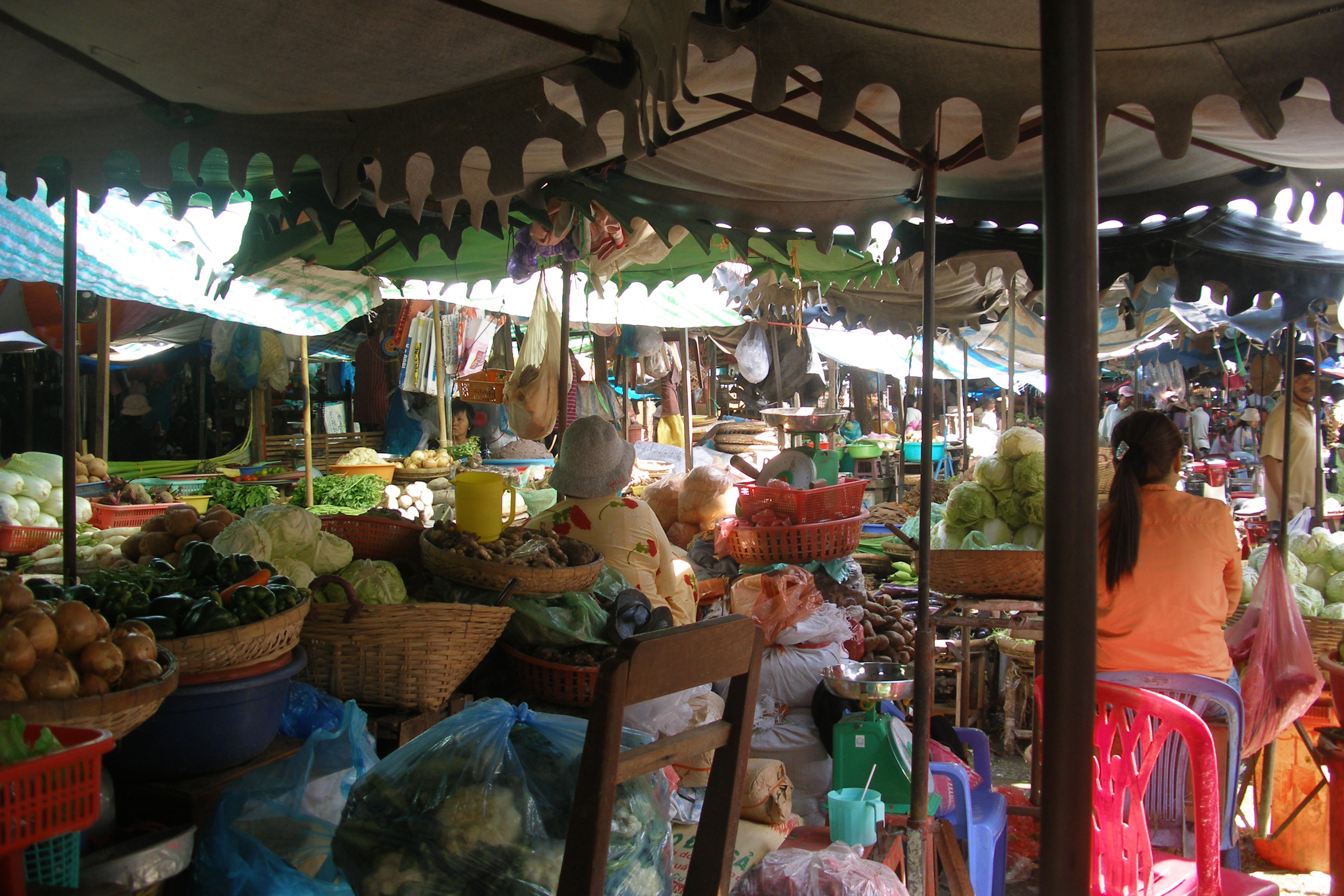
Market

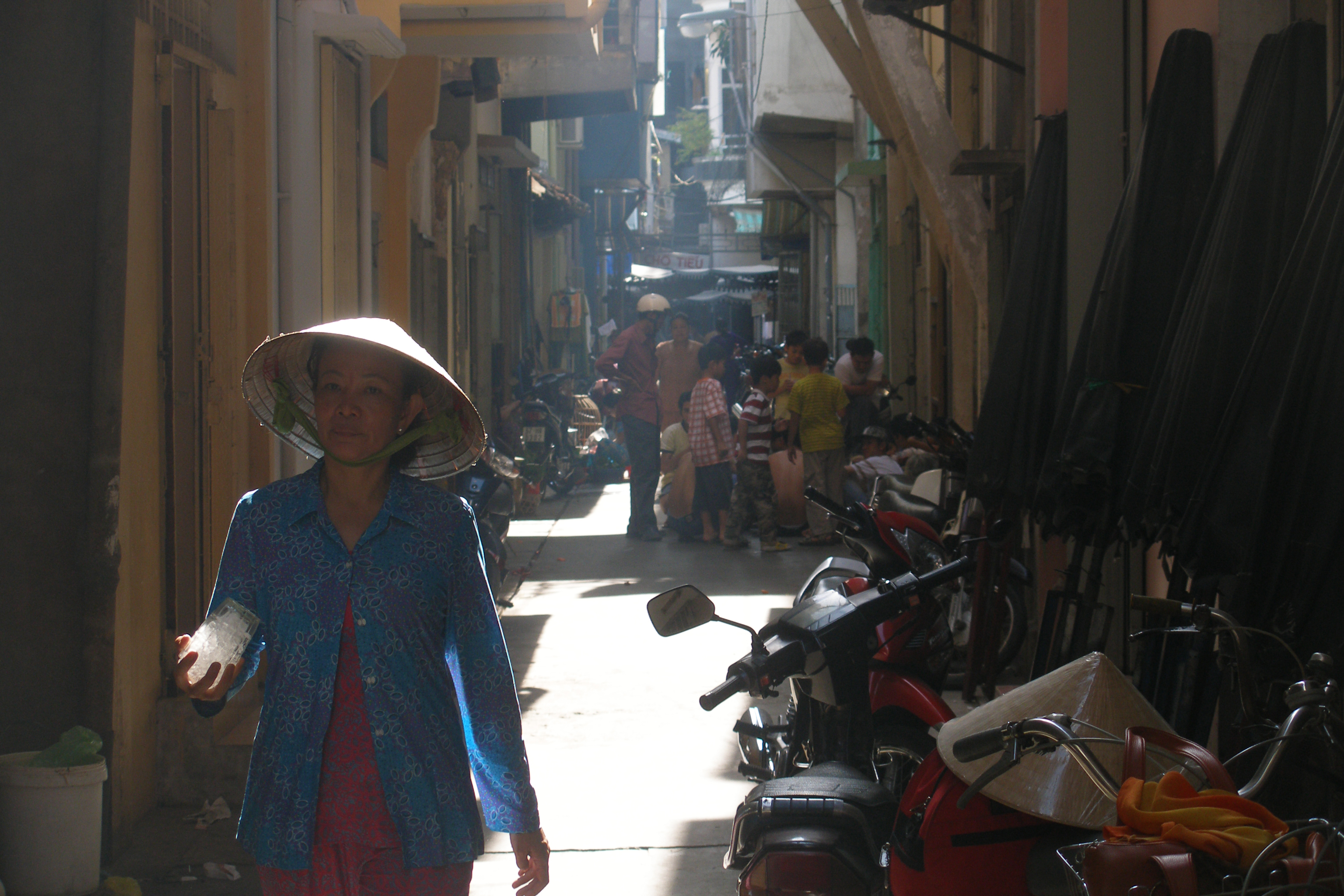
City street

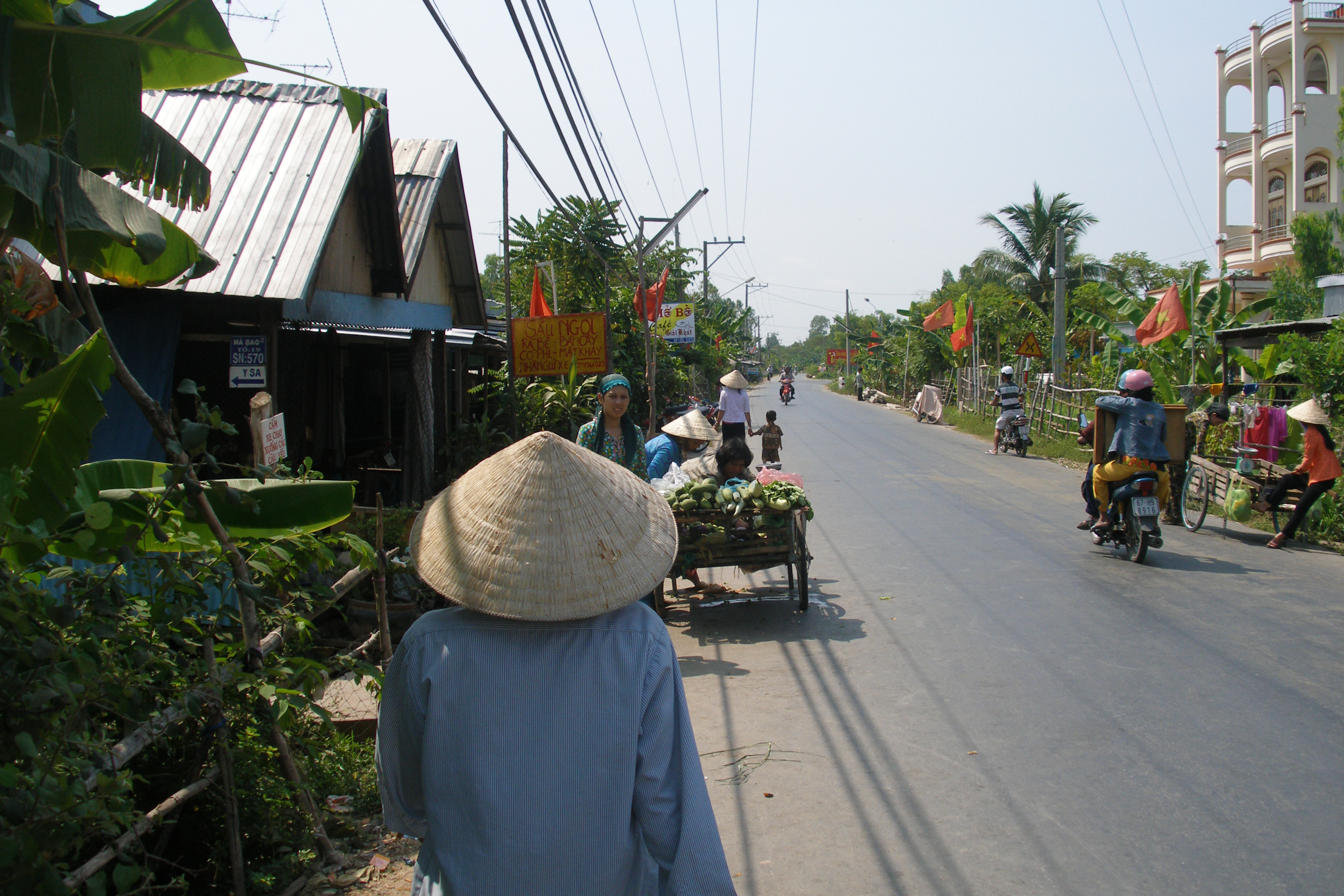
City street

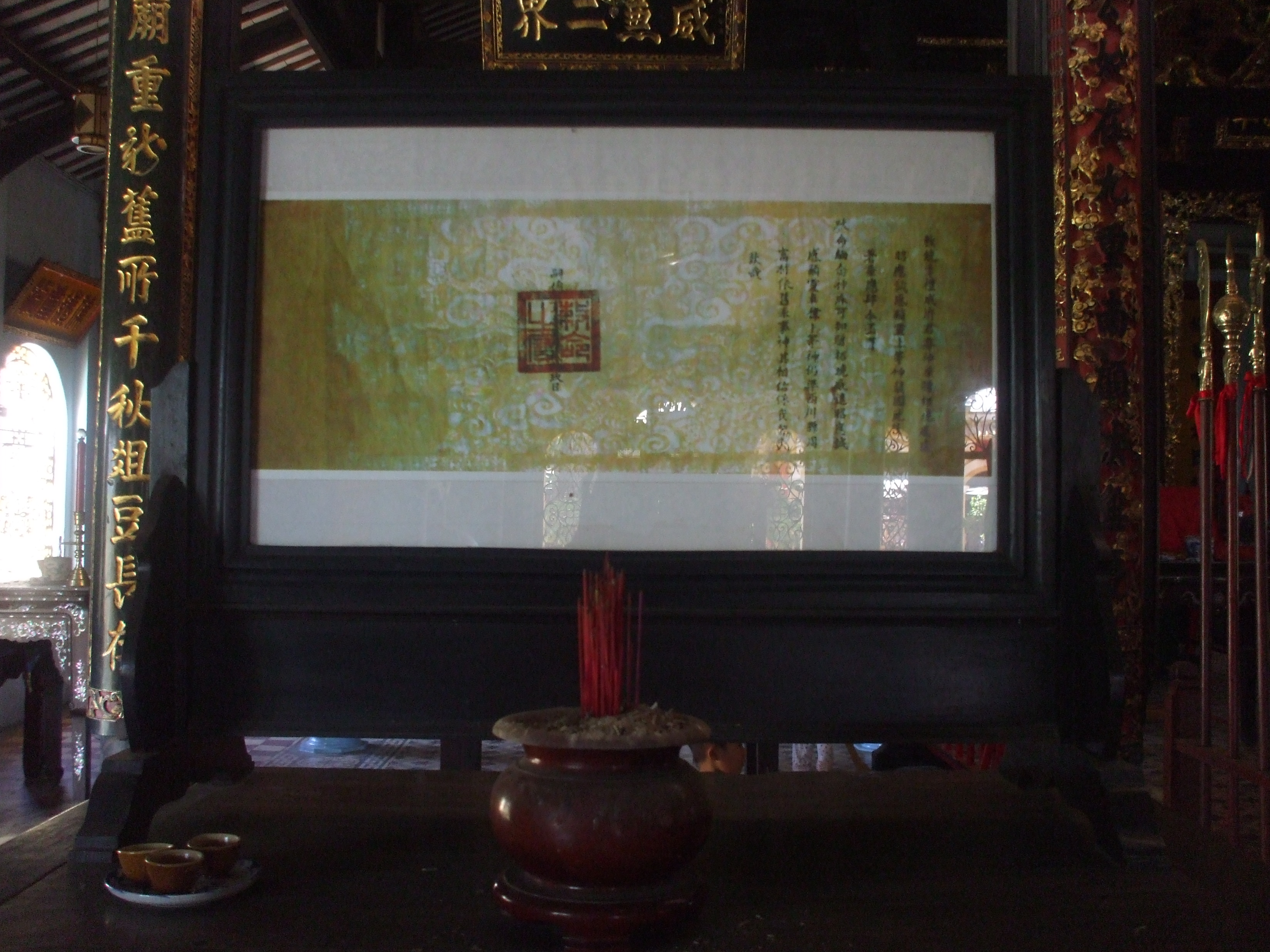
The honours paper in Châu Phú temple
