= Vĩnh Tế (disambiguation) =

Vĩnh Tế may refer to:

- Vĩnh Tế, An Giang, a ward of An Giang province
- Vĩnh Tế Canal, a canal in Mekong Delta, Vietnam
