= Hang Temple =

Hang Temple (Vietnamese: Chùa Hang) means "Cave Temple" and may refer to many temples in Vietnam:

- Hang Temple (Phuoc Dien Temple), Chau Doc, An Giang
- Hang Temple, My Hoa commune, Phu My District, Binh Dinh
- Hang Temple (Co Thach Tu ), Binh Thanh, Tuy Phong District, Binh Thuan
- Hang Temple (Hai An Temple), Nha Trang, Khanh Hoa
- Hang Temple, An Binh commune, Kien Luong District, Kien Giang
- Hang Temple, Ly Son Island, Quang Ngai
- Hang Temple, Cho Chu, Dinh Hoa District, Thai Nguyen
- Hang Temple, Chua Hang, Dong Hy District, Thai Nguyen
- Hang Temple, Chau Thanh, Chau Thanh District, Tra Vinh
- Hang Temple (i.e. Chua Huong Nghiem), An Khang commune, Yen Son, Tuyen Quang
