= Bà Chúa Xứ =

Prosperity goddess worshiped in the Mekong Delta region

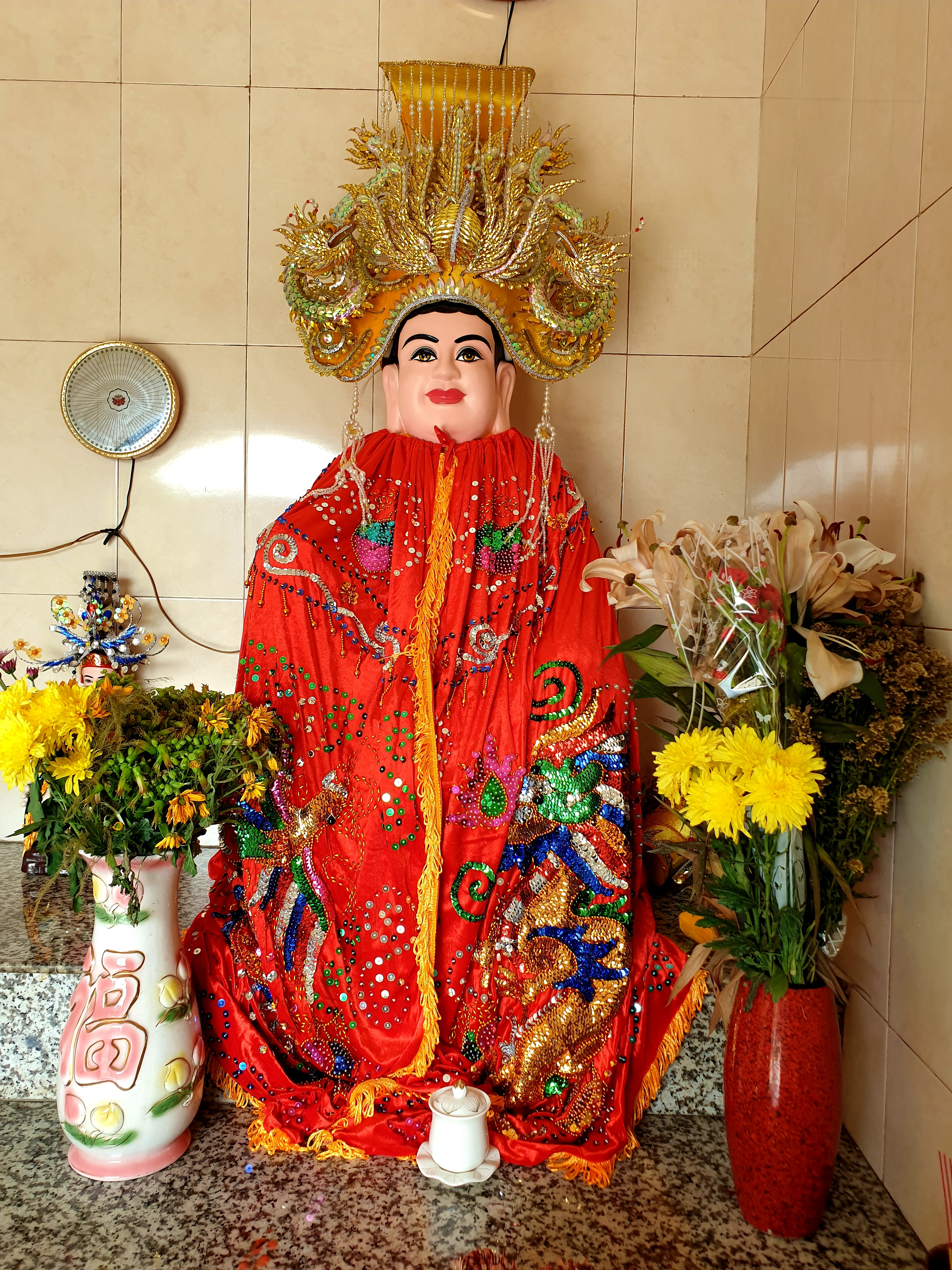
Bà Chúa Xứ statue in Bình An temple

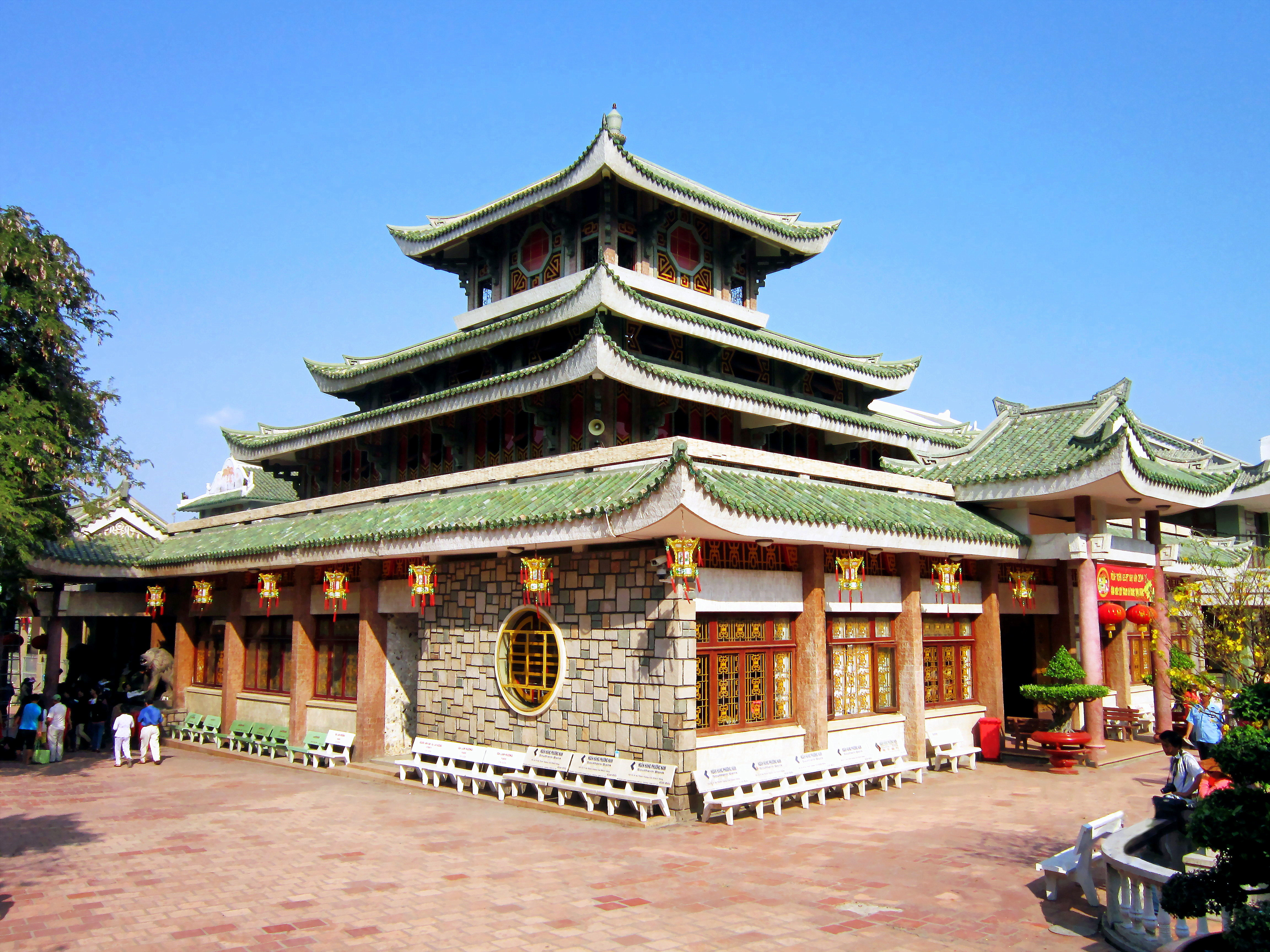
Temple of Bà Chúa Xứ Núi Sam today

Bà Chúa Xứ (chữ Nôm: 婆主處, Vietnamese: [ɓâː cǔə sɨ̌]) or Chúa Xứ Thánh Mẫu (chữ Hán: 主處聖母, Holy Mother of the Realm) is a prosperity goddess worshiped in the Mekong Delta region as part of Vietnamese folk religions. She is a tutelary of business, health, and a protector of the Vietnamese border. She is considered prestigious and is worshipped in her temple in Vĩnh Tế village at the foot of Sam Mountain, An Giang province. A three-day festival is held in the village at the beginning of the rainy season, beginning on the twenty-third day of the fourth lunar month, in her honour. Bà Chúa Xứ reached her peak of popularity in the 1990s and still endears pilgrims and followers in and outside Vietnam with her responsiveness to fervent, devout and sincere prayers.

== The statue of Bà Chúa Xứ ==
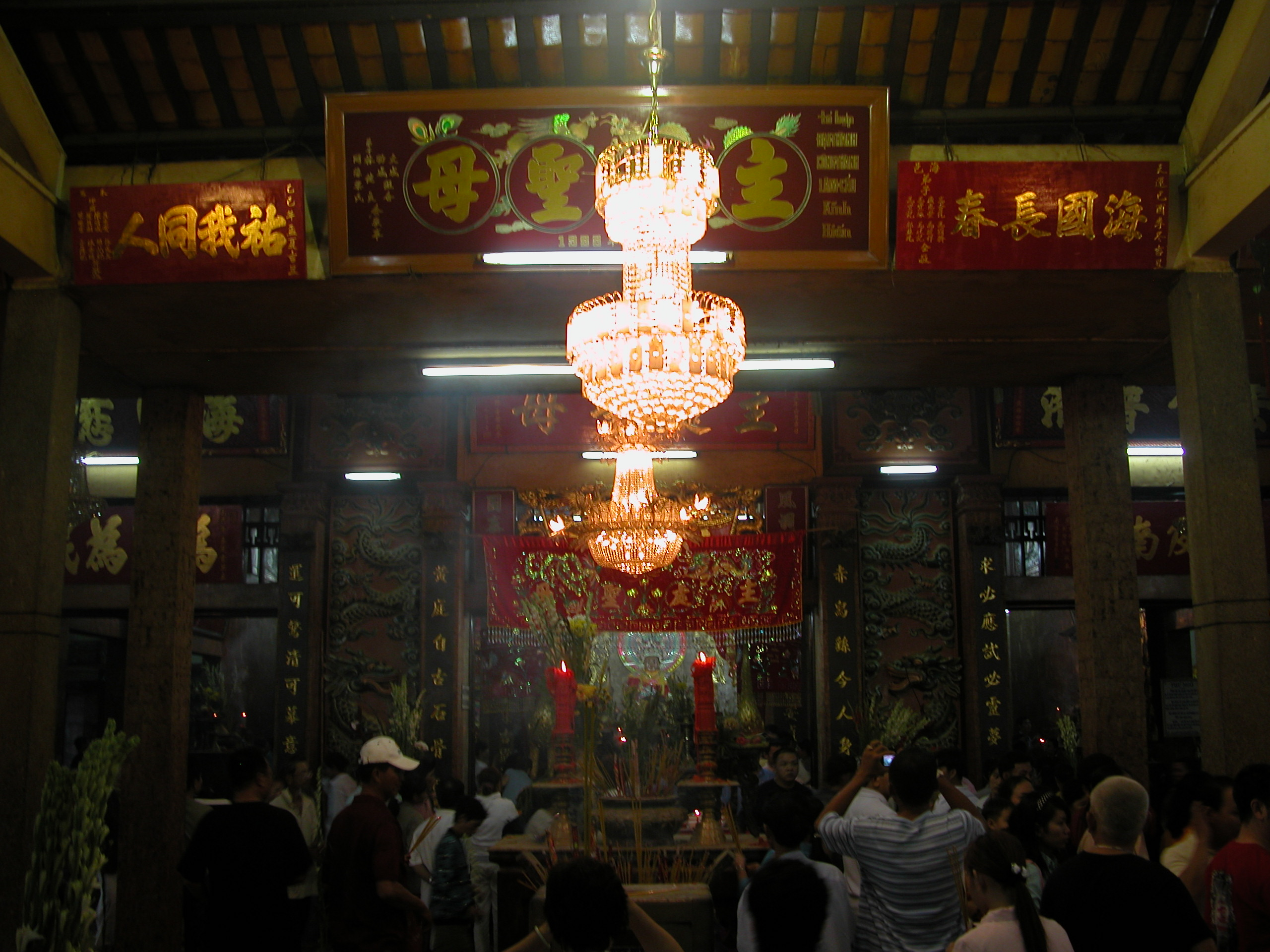
The main sanctuary of Bà Chúa Xứ at Sam Mountain.

According to French archaeologist Louis Malleret, the statue of the Lady of the Realm worshipped in Vĩnh Tế village is, in fact, an appropriated and feminized statue of Shiva, belonging to the pre-Angkorean Funan Kingdom of Cambodia. Stories from her worshippers, emerged after the Vietnamese came to the area, offer a different version in which recount her growing naturally from stone before being discovered by the Vietnamese of Sam Mountain.

== Mythology ==
=== The assistance of Thoại Ngọc Hầu ===
Stories state that the Lady of the Realm protected Thoại Ngọc Hầu (1761–1829), a mandarin representing the Vietnamese court during the early days of occupation of the south of Vietnam and was instrumental in creating and defending the border between Vietnam and Cambodia. The legend states that his wife, Chau Thi Te, went to Bà Chúa Xứ's shrine on Sam Mountain to pray for her husband to defeat the enemy and bring peace to the land. Thoại Ngọc Hầu was able to fend off the Khmer troops, and Chau Thi Te showed her gratitude to the goddess by rebuilding the shrine that held her. When the temple was complete, Chau Thi Te held a festival that lasted three days. Those days became the annual date for the festival for Bà Chúa Xứ.

=== Discovery of the Lady of the Realm ===
Popular tales regarding the discovery of the goddess begin with either the statue appearing on the peak of an island as the water level in the Mekong Delta recedes, either because she was placed there many centuries before, or because she grew naturally from the stone. Some tales state that the people of the region simply built a temple around where they discovered her. Another popular account places her higher up the mountain. In this version, she possesses a young village girl, announces her identity and tells the people of the village where she is located on the summit of Sam Mountain. The goddess wished to be venerated, so forty of the villages strongest men tried to carry her down the mountain, but found her to be far too heavy to carry. The Lady then reappeared to tell the villagers that only nine virgin girls would be able to carry her. They proceeded until arriving at the base of the hill where the Lady of the Realm decided she was meant to remain, and she became heavy once more. This is where her temple stands today.

=== Pilgrim tales ===
Bà Chúa Xứ is known for being supportive and responsive to prayer, but also brutal to those she feels have swindled her. In a publication produced by the temple in Vinh Te village, a tale reads that a man once stole a necklace right off of her neck by walking into and out of the temple on his hands. This way, she was unable to reach his neck. However, once he arrived to safety and stood up, he dropped to the ground once more, dead. She shows similar treatment to those who ask her for favours and don't keep their promises. Other tales recount her killing people who have tried to move her, and breaking the arms of misbehaving children. Another story tells that she even killed someone who tried to bathe her five minutes too early on a festival evening.

Another origin story of the Lady of the Realm states that she was the wife of a general who fought for Vietnam against an invading enemy. While he was away, she prayed for his success and for a safe return home. Unfortunately, he was killed, but she continued to remain faithful to him. She was hailed in the village as an example of true loyalty and marital fidelity.

A story often recounted about the statue's missing arm involved foreign invaders from Siam. The invading troops tried to remove her from her lofty position, and ended up damaging the goddess and severing her arm. Wounded, the powerful spirit killed them all on the spot.

== Worship ==
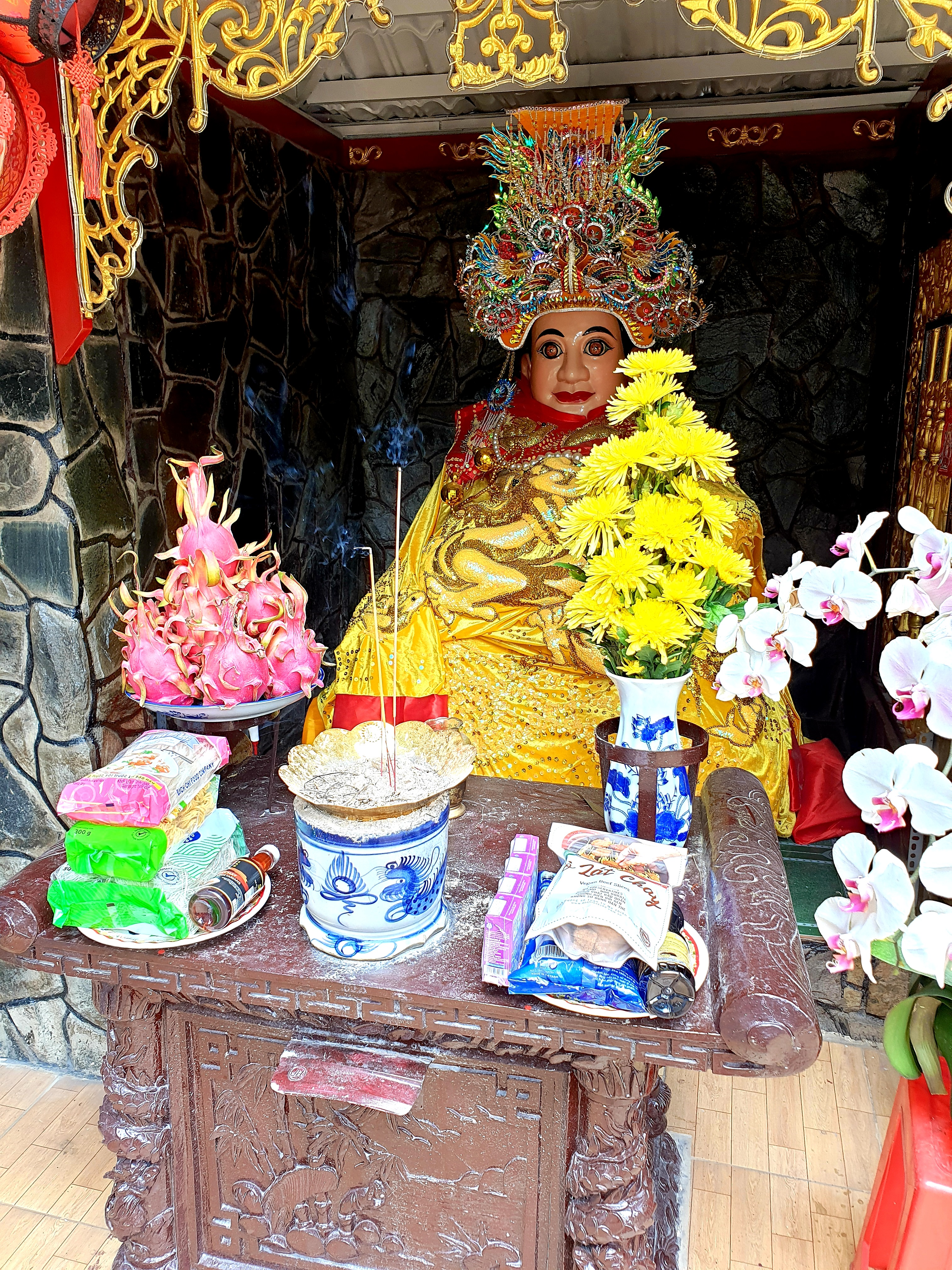
Bà Chưa Xứ statue at Long Hưng Temple

The Lady of the Realm is known as a protector deity. She is one of many goddesses who have grown popular in southern Vietnam since Đổi Mới. She can provide assistance for business success, health, fertility, domestic harmony, scholastic success, and divination of the future. She engages in credit activities, and pilgrims will exchange money for her spirit money, which is said to accumulate wealth. One is then required to repay the goddess for years to come, and keep to the promises he/she has made to her. She is known to be effective against those who do not return what they owe. The Lady of the Realm and other Vietnamese goddesses act to psychologically assist the people in need, and to support community.

=== Pilgrimage ===
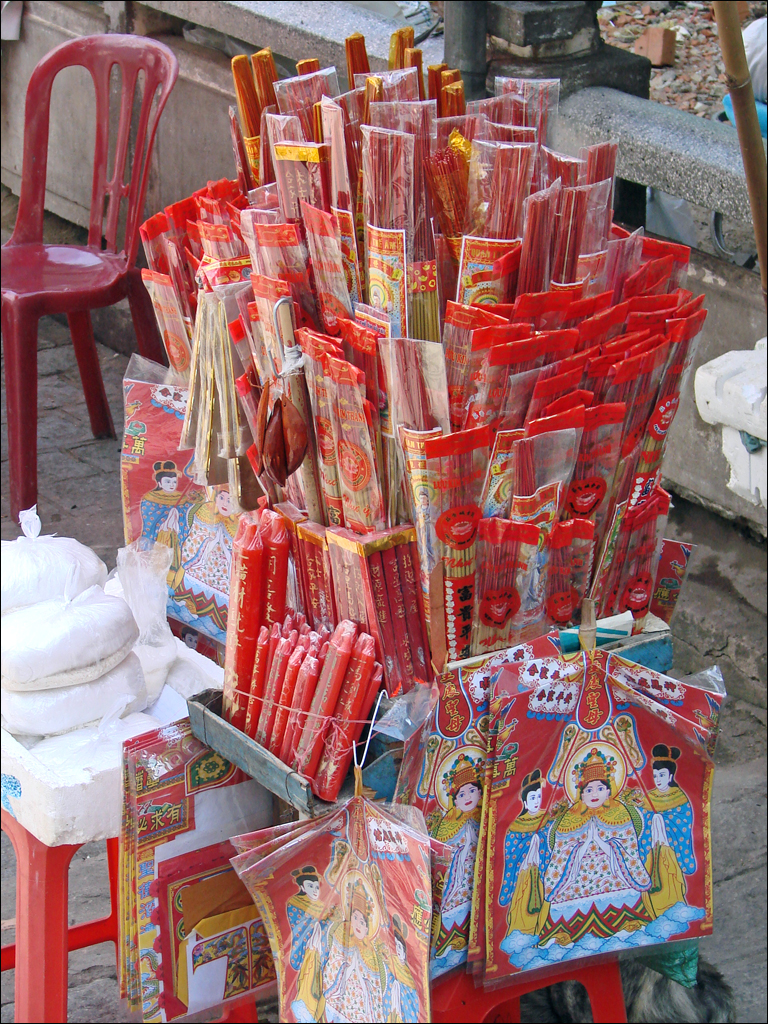
Joss paper offerings to Bà Chúa Xứ are sold near the temple

A large portion of pilgrims who come to the shrine in Vĩnh Tế are female entrepreneurs. The act of making a pilgrimage to the goddess is seen as an act of proper morality toward their benefactress. Once seeking the assistance of the Lady of the Realm, one is required to return to her to keep promises and give thanks for her assistance. It is said among pilgrims that a man who asks her Ladyship for help will have to return to her annually for nine years, and a woman for seven. Pilgrimage is a necessary part of returning these promises for many rural as well as Ho Chi Minh City inhabitants who worship her.

=== Festival ===
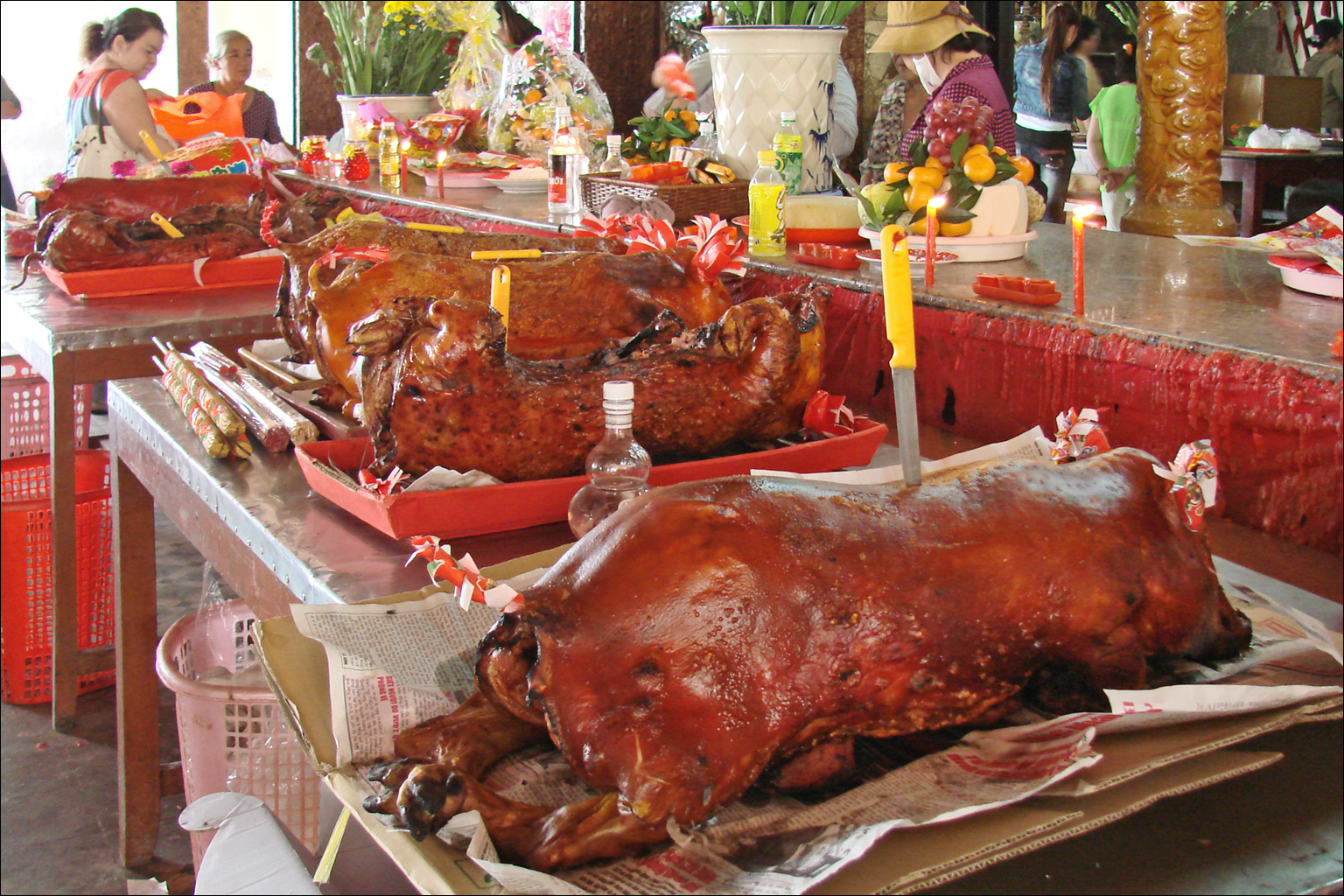
Offerings to Bà Chúa Xứ during the festival

Bà Chúa Xứ Festival starts from at night of April 23 to 27 of the lunar calendar. This largest festival begins at the temple of Bà Chúa Xứ in Sam Mountain, in southern Vietnam.

The Lady of the Realm is a painted statue made of stone and cement, depicted with large eyes and clothed in brocade sequin robes and housed in a great shrine decorated with offerings that were given to her. During the festival at the beginning of the rainy season, she is bathed in rainwater mixed with perfume, and her robe is changed by elderly women of the village.

Thoai Ngoc Hau, who also has a mausoleum in the village, has a statue paraded into the goddess’ room to stay as a guest during the festival. It is accompanied by a series of sacrifices (including a big pig for roasting) performed by the village's cult committee. An invocation is performed to receive peace and prosperity from the goddess, and series of opera performances take place.

The area around the shrine comes alive with markets and entertainment, including cải lương, beauty queen contests, slideshows, magic acts, a house of horrors, karate, gambling, restaurants, cafes, bars, and a popular sideshow of dancing cross dressers which was banned in the late 1990s. Her shrine is the most popularly visited religious site in southern Vietnam.

== Ethnicity ==
Bà Chúa Xứ's ethnicity has been identified by some as the same as the Cham goddess Po Inu Nagar (Vietnamese people have Vietnameseized this goddess into Thiên Y A Na), the Chinese goddess Mazu, a Khmer Black Lady (Yeay Mao) or even as Quan Âm. Despite the adoption of Chinese, Khmer, and Cham ethnic traits, she is an example of a being who accepts all of the ethnic traits bestowed upon her. Many aspects of her worship are borrowed from these ethnic groups. Her story is similar to that of many goddesses in the region. A leader in peril receives assistance from a spirit and remains indebted to her forever, thereby holding legitimate authority to the land in question.

The statue itself was a Khmer creation of the Cambodian version of Shiva. Few common interpretations, however, identify her as anything but Vietnamese. Several state that she may have been brought from far away, or created locally. The most popular understanding, however, appears to be that she simply grew from the geography of southern Vietnam. Many stories source her as simply being discovered where she sits on a hill at the foot of Sam mountain, or in other stories, poised at its peak. The water of the Mekong Delta slowly receded and she was simply found there, where they built a temple. Taylor points out that it is suspicious that there is no sign of the native people of the region in these stories. She is always explained as being lonely and desiring attention in a land completely empty. Instead, the Lady of the Realm acts as a force that keeps the Khmer at bay and the Viet in power.

It is also understood to some that the Lady of the Realm is, in fact, the Chinese goddess Mazu, whose cult is very similar to, if not equal to the Lady of the Realm. Veneration of local spirits is understood by many ethnic Chinese to be a Chinese practice, and the Lady of the Realm is understood to be a Chinese spirit. Another opinion holds that she was a Thai rebel who assisted the Nguyen dynasty emperor, Gia Long, defeat Tay Son rebels who overthrew him in the eighteenth century. She travelled to southern Vietnam with her husband at the behest of her king, and died there. In this tale, she was buried on the island of Phú Quốc, where one is supposed to worship her. However, her site on Sam Mountain stands as a boundary marker to dramatically define where Vietnam ends and Cambodia begins. It is seen to have both ethnic and political valance.

== Feminism ==
The worship of goddesses is understood by many Vietnamese people as the natural religious practice of the country from an ancient matriarchal society. Therefore, after dramatically altering social events such as Doi Moi, people turned to goddesses such as the Lady of the Realm as a symbol of consistent and traditional aspects of their society. These goddesses represent a country woman, unscathed from the rapid transformations of the city and urbanization, one which guards the border as a feminine representation of Vietnamese religious values.

The Lady of the Realm is turned to for issues that are generally handled by the female figures of the traditional Vietnamese household. Her Ladyship is also consulted as a mother and asked for assistance in matters of money and assistance in life's day-to-day difficulties. She and other goddesses are turned to because they are maternal figures, money managers, disciplinarians, and educators. Her Ladyship is treated with the same respect as the head of the Vietnamese household. Responsiveness is also seen as a feminine trait in Vietnam. Also, the woman's ability to procreate is also seen as an act that can occur with other things she touches as well, including money.

== See also ==
- Thiên Y A Na
- Bà Đen
- Liễu Hạnh
- Black Virgin Mountain

== Reference Books ==
- Taylor, Philip. Goddess on the Rise. 2004. University of Hawai'i Press, Hawai'i.
