= Tây An Temple =

Buddhist temple in southern Vietnam

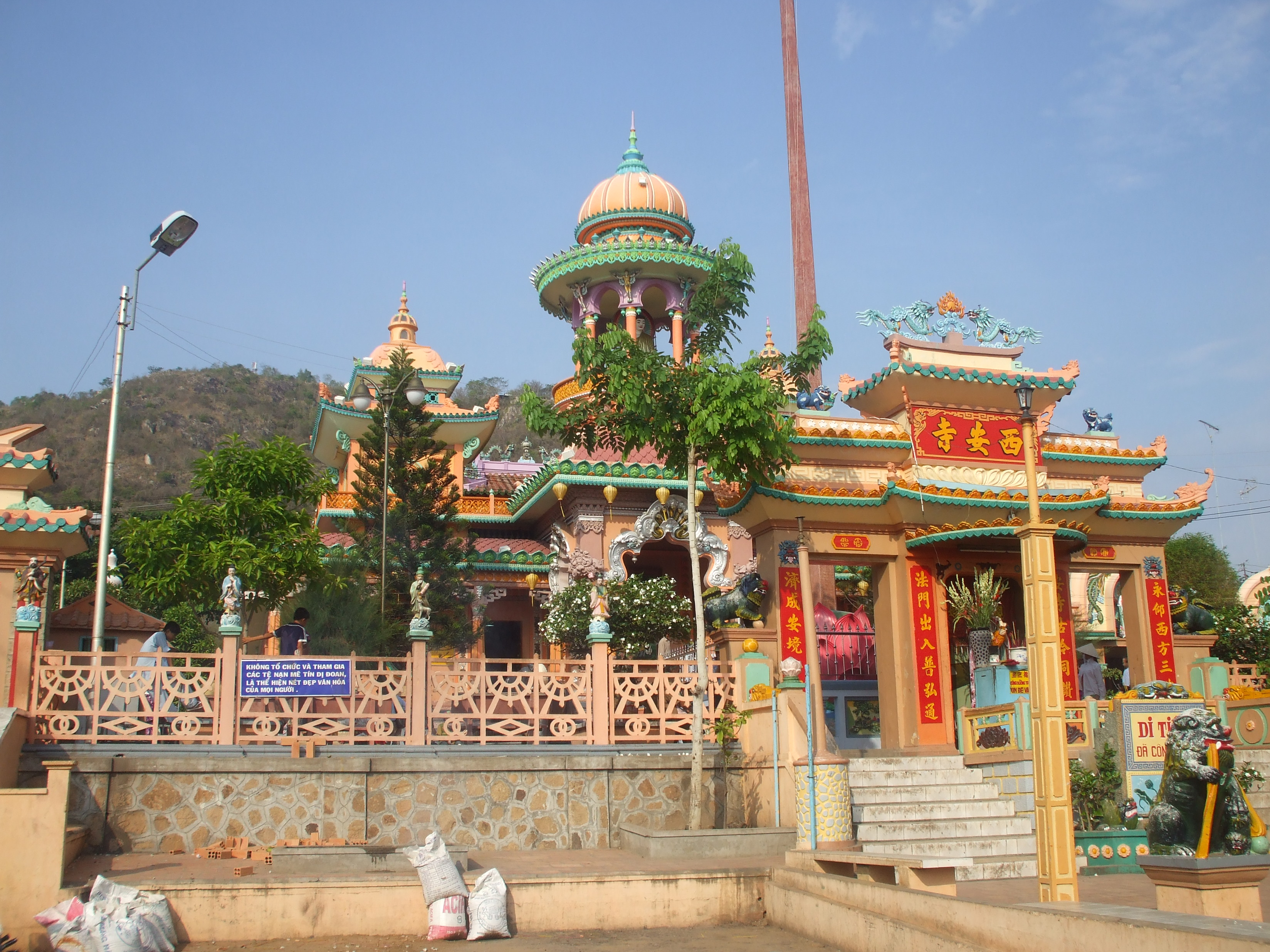
Tây An pagoda near Mount Sam, Châu Đốc town, An Giang province, Vietnam.

Tây An Temple is a notable Buddhist temple in southern Vietnam, near the town of Châu Đốc in An Giang Province in the Mekong Delta, known for its historic and architectural features.

== History ==
The temple was built by the Governor of An Giang, Doãn Uẩn, in 1847. The temple is located near Sam Mountain, five kilometres from Châu Đốc. The Đại Nam nhất thống chí, the official chronicles of the Nguyễn dynasty that ruled Vietnam at the time noted that the temple stood on a mountain overlooking the town and the province, praising its scenery and vibrancy.

In the past century and a half, the temple has been renovated many times, two of which stand out above the others. In 1861, Thích Nhất Thừa renovated the main hall and the patriarch hall at the rear. In 1958, Thích Bửu Thọ raised funds to refurbish the main hall, the front of the temple and erect a three-storey tower. The temple's architecture fuses Indian styles with local motifs.

At the front near the triple gate is a statue of the bodhisattva Avalokiteshvara. On the front pavement are two elephants statues, a black one with two tusks and a white one with six tusks. Inside the main hall are approximately 200 statues of Buddhas, bodhisattvas, arahants, atulas, and devas, mostly made of wood. All of these date back to the 19th century and were crafted by local artisans from An Giang and nearby Đồng Tháp Province.

The rear of the temple has various stupas dedicated to deceased monks. One of the most notable is that of Tây An Master, Đoàn Minh Huyên (1807–1856) from Sa Đéc. He was notable for his travels in the Mekong Delta, expounding the dharma from 1849 onwards, before spending his last years at the temple.

Tây An hosts traditional Buddhis festivals on an annual basis, the full moon of the first lunar month, the full moon of the tenth lunar month and the twelfth of the eighth lunar month, the death anniversary of the Tây An Master. During these festivals, in addition to the first four lunar months of the year, the temple attracts a large number of pilgrims from all locations.
