= Phước Điền Temple =

- Chùa Phước Điền

Religion
- Affiliation: Buddhism

Location
- Location: Châu Đốc, An Giang, Vietnam

Phước Điền Temple (Vietnamese: Chùa Phước Điền) (also known as Chùa Hang or Hang Temple) is a temple in Châu Đốc, An Giang Province, southwestern Vietnam. It is an official historic monument, proclaimed on July 10, 1980, by the Ministry of Culture and Information of Vietnam.

== Gallery ==
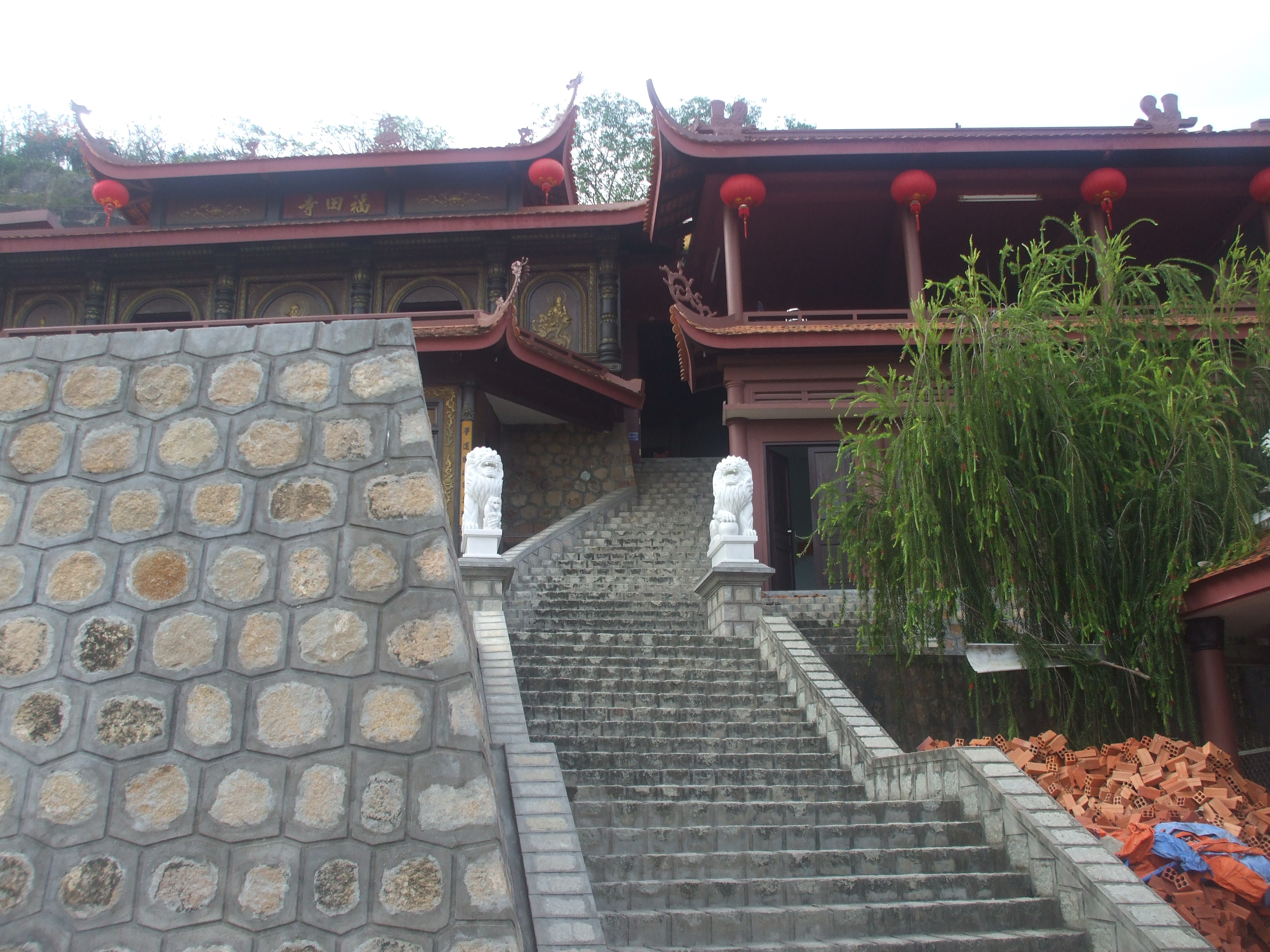

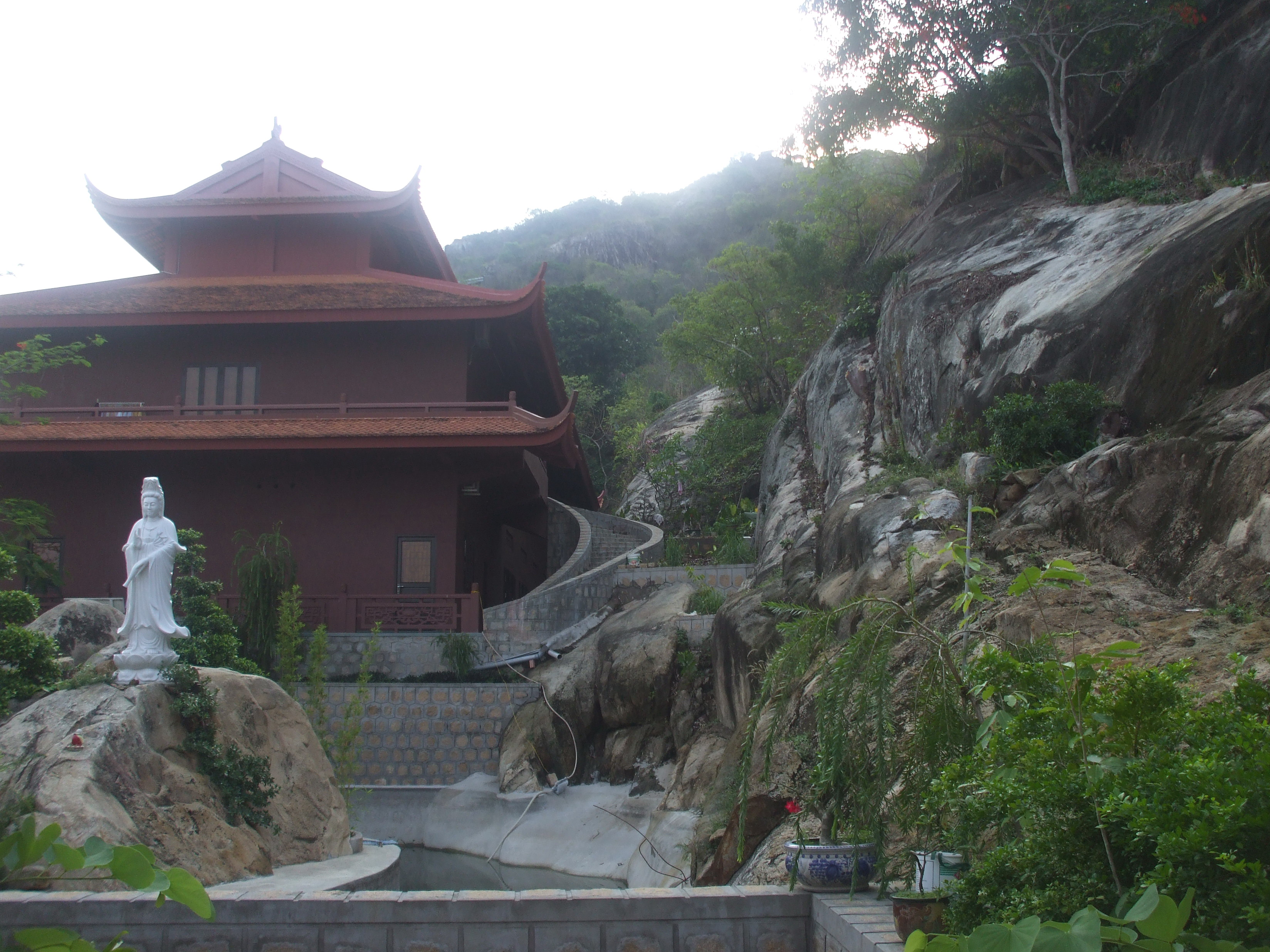

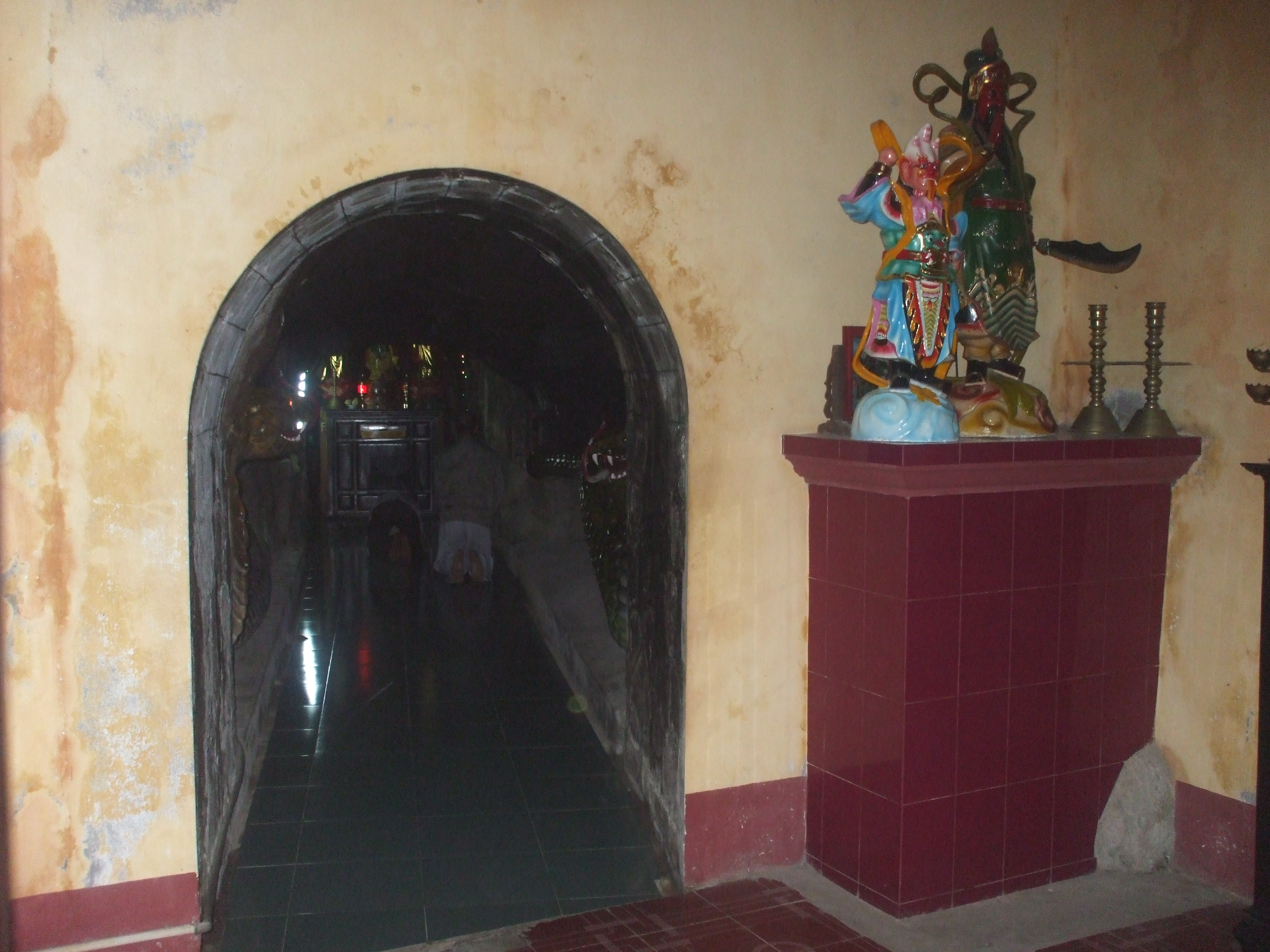
