= Vĩnh Tế, An Giang =

Ward in Vietnam

Vĩnh Tế
- Ward
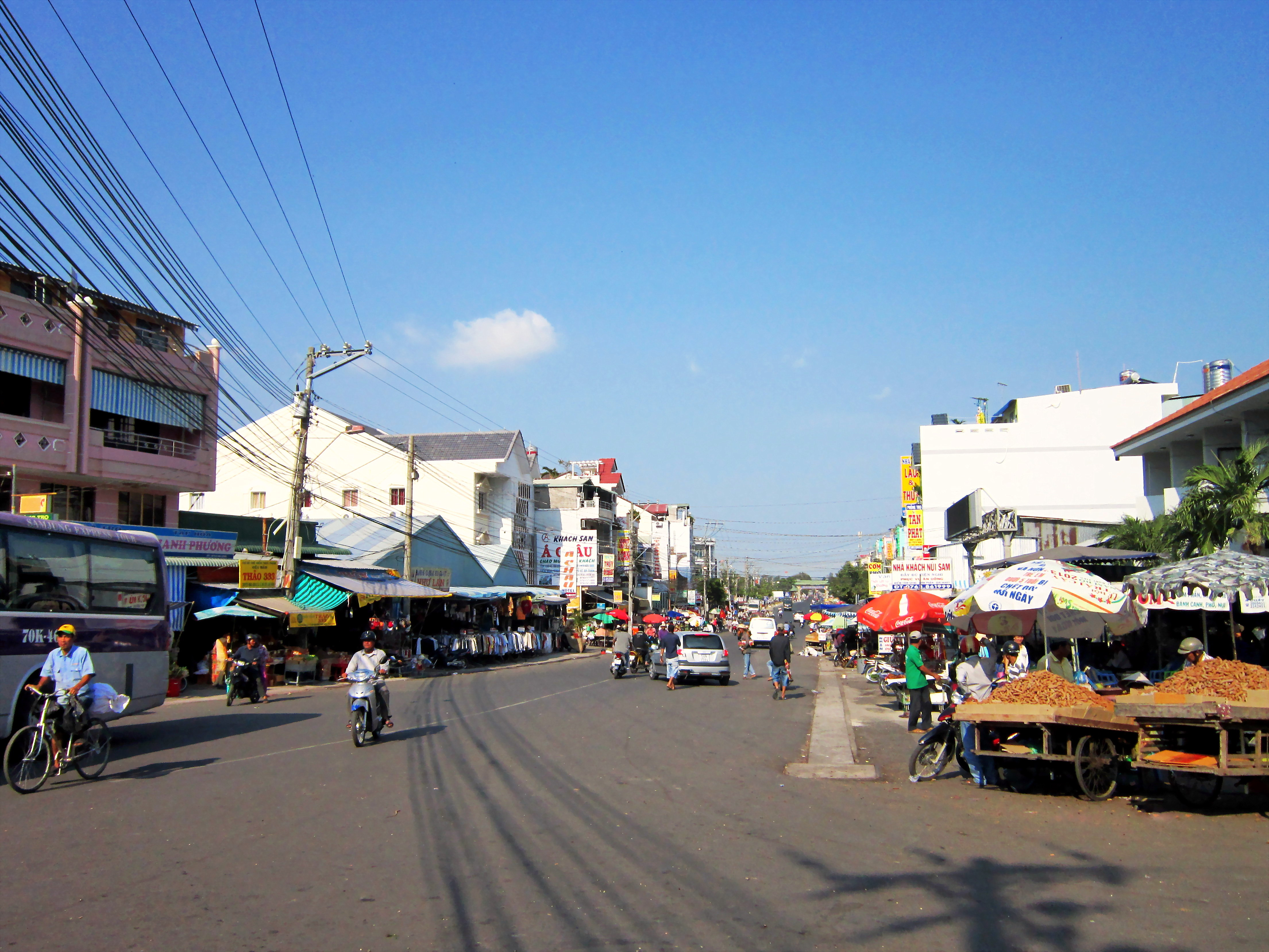
- A street corner in Nui Sam ward
- Interactive map of Vĩnh Tế
- Coordinates: 10°39′38″N 105°04′12″E
- Country: Vietnam
- Province: An Giang
- Time zone: UTC+07:00 (Indochina Time)
- Climate: Aw

Vĩnh Tế is a ward (phường) of An Giang Province, Vietnam.
